= List of fossil bird genera =

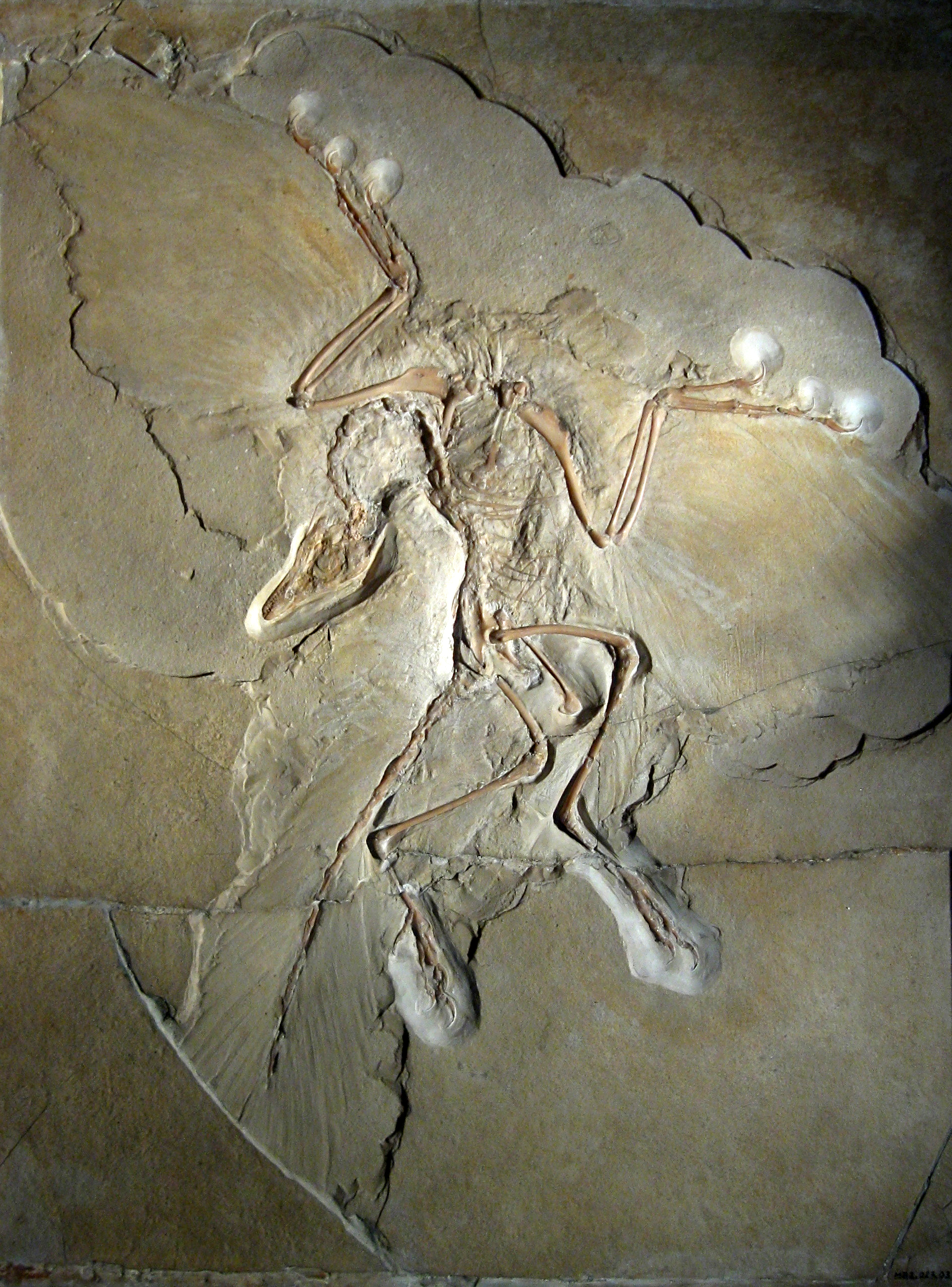
Photograph of the Berlin specimen of Archaeopteryx, the most famous prehistoric "bird". Modern research considers it unlikely to be a bird ancestor, though it was certainly a close relative.

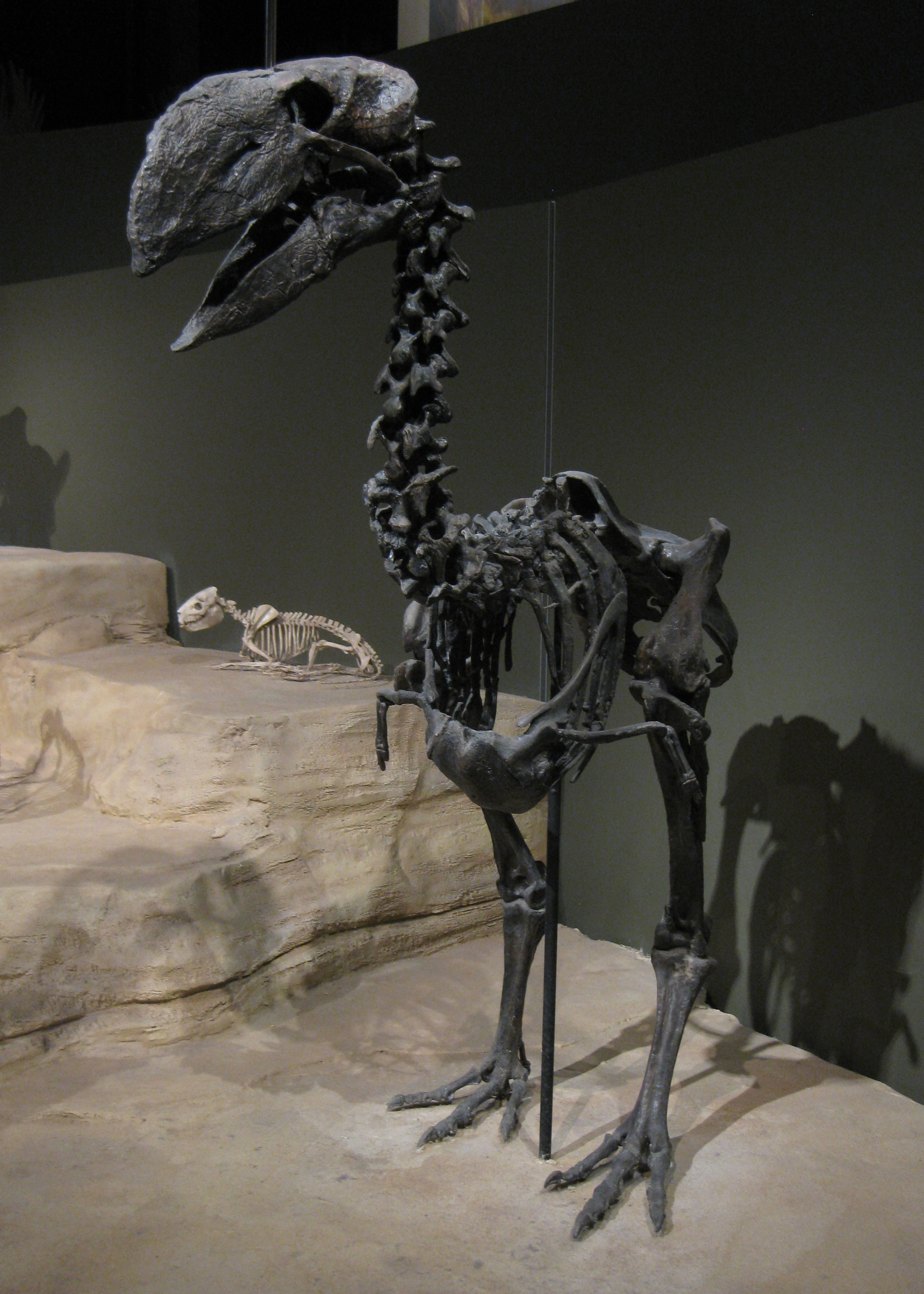
A skeleton of the Cenozoic fossil bird Gastornis

Birds evolved from certain feathered theropod dinosaurs, and there is no real dividing line between birds and non-avian dinosaurs except that some of the former survived the Cretaceous–Paleogene extinction event while the latter did not. For the purposes of this article, a 'bird' is considered to be any member of the clade Avialae. Some dinosaur groups which may or may not be true birds are listed below under protobirds.

This page contains a listing of prehistoric bird taxa only known from completely fossilized specimens. These extinctions took place before the Late Quaternary and thus took place in the absence of significant human interference. While the earliest hominids had been eating birds and especially their eggs, human population and technology was simply insufficient to seriously affect healthy bird populations until the Upper Paleolithic Revolution. Rather, reasons for the extinctions listed here are stochastic abiotic events such as bolide impacts, climate changes due to orbital shifts, mass volcanic eruptions etc. Alternatively, species may have gone extinct due to evolutionary displacement by successor or competitor taxa – it is notable that an extremely large number of seabirds have gone extinct during the mid-Tertiary; this seems at least partly due to competition by the contemporary radiation of marine mammals.

The relationships of these taxa are often hard to determine, as many are known only from very fragmentary remains and due to the complete fossilization precluding analysis of information from DNA, RNA or protein sequencing. The taxa listed in this article should be classified with the Wikipedia conservation status category "Fossil".

Before the late 19th century, when minerals were still considered one of the kingdoms of binomial nomenclature, fossils were often treated according to a parallel taxonomy. Rather than assigning them to animal or plant genera, they were treated as mineral genera and given binomial names typically using Osteornis ("bone-bird") or Ornitholithus ("bird fossil") as "genus". The latter name, however, is still in use for an oogenus of fossil bird eggs. Also, other animals (in particular pterosaurs) were placed in these "genera". In sources pre-dating the Linnean system, the above terms are also seen in the more extensive descriptions used to name taxa back then.

== Taxonomic list of fossil prehistoric birds ==
Higher-level taxa are presented in likely or suspected phylogenetic order. Genus-level taxa and lower are sorted chronologically, in ascending order (i.e., older taxa first).

The higher-level groups of non-Neornithes are arranged based on the phylogeny proposed by Luis Chiappe, updated and expanded to incorporate recent research. The categories are inclusive in ascending order.

Taxonomic assignments, especially in the pygostylian to early neornithine genera, are still very provisional and subject to quite frequent change.

== Basal Avialae (extinct) ==
The most primitive "birds", usually still possessing a long bony tail with generally unfused vertebrae. Not all of these may be on the line of bird ancestors; whether they are not closer to other theropods groups than to the Avialae remains to be thoroughly tested (see Xiaotingia).

- †Anchiornis huxleyi Xu et al. 2009
- †Aurornis xui Godefroit et al. 2013
- †Balaur bondoc Csiki et al. 2010
- †Jixiangornis orientalis Ji et al. 2002
- †Xiaotingia zhengi Xu et al. 2011
- †Yandangornithiformes Cai & Zhao 1999
  - †Yandangornithidae Cai & Zhao 1999
    - †Yandangornis longicaudatus Cai & Zhao 1999 (Late Cretaceous)
- †Archaeopterygiformes Fürbringer 1888
  - †Archaeopterygidae Huxley 1871 [Archaeornithidae Petronievics 1925; Archaeopteridae Shufeldt 1903; Archornithidae Carus 1875]a
    - †Wellnhoferia grandis Elzanowski 2001 (Late Jurassic) – possible synonym of Archaeopteryx
    - †Archaeopteryx Meyer 1861 [Archaeornis Peteronievics 1917; Griphornis Woodward 1862; Griphosaurus Wagner 1861 (nomen rejectum)] (Late Jurassic)
- †Jeholornithiformes Zhou & Zhang 2006
  - †Jeholornithidae Zhou & Zhang 2006
    - †Dalianraptor cuhe Gao & Liu 2005
    - †Jeholornis Zhou & Zhang 2002b [Shenzhouraptor Ji et al. 2002] (Early Cretaceous)

== Basal Pygostylia (extinct) ==
The earliest birds with a modern pygostyle: a reduction and fusion of the tail vertebrae; possibly a paraphyletic group. Two types of pygostyle are known, a rod-shaped one found in Confuciusornithidae, Enantiornithes and some non-avian theropods such as Nomingia, and a plowshare-shaped one, only known in the lineage leading to modern birds. It is not certain that the pygostyles found in birds are indeed synapomorphies.

- †Chongmingia zhengi Wang et al. 2016
- †Confuciusornithiformes Hou et al. 1995
  - †Proornis coreae Lim 1993 (nomen nudum)
  - †Zhongornis haoae Gao et al. 2008 - confuciusornithid?
  - †Confuciusornithidae Hou et al. 1995
    - †Changchengornis hengdaoziensis Ji, Chiappe & Ji 1999 (Early Cretaceous)
    - †Eoconfuciusornis zhengi Zhang, Zhou & Benton 2008 (Early Cretaceous)
    - †Evgenavis nobilis O'Connor, Averianov & Zelenkov 2014
    - †Confuciusornis Hou et al. 1995 [Jinzhouornis Hou et al. 2002] (Early Cretaceous)
- †Omnivoropterygiformes Czerkas & Ji 2002 [Sapeornithiformes Zhou & Zhang 2006]
  - †Omnivoropterygidae Czerkas & Ji 2002 [Sapeornithidae Zhou & Zhang 2006]
    - †Omnivoropteryx sinousaorum Czerkas & Qiang Ji 2002 (Early Cretaceous)
    - †Sapeornis chaoyangensis Zhou & Zhang 2002a [Didactylornis jii Yuan 2008; Sapeornis angustis Provini, Zhou & Zhang 2009; Shenshiornis primita Hu et al. 2010] (Early Cretaceous)

== Enantiornithes (extinct) ==
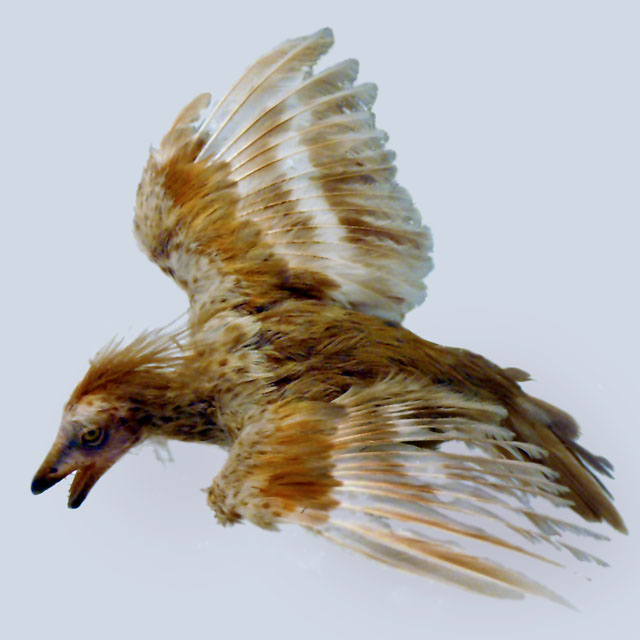
Reconstruction of Iberomesornis romerali, a tiny primitive enantiornithine. It was no bigger than a modern-day finch.

The taxonomic list of enantiornithine groups presented here follows a summary published by Thomas R. Holz Jr. in 2011.

†Enantiornithes

- Basal Enantiornithes and Enantiornithes incerta sedis
  - †Cerebavis cenomanica Kurochkin et al. 2006 (Late Cretaceous)
  - †Cruralispennia multidonta Wang et al. 2017
  - †Dalingheornis liweii Zhang et al. 2006 (Early Cretaceous)
  - †Dunhuangia cuii Wang et al. 2015
  - †Elsornis keni Chiappe et al. 2007 (Late Cretaceous)
  - †Feitianius paradisi O'Connor et al. 2015
  - †Holbotia ponomarenkoi Zelenkov & Averianov 2015 [Holbotia ponomarenkoi Kuročkin 1982 nomen nudum]
  - †Houornis caudatus (Hou 1997) Wang & Liu 2015 [Cathayornis caudatus Hou 1997]
  - †Laevisoolithidae Mikhailov 1991 [Subtiliolithidae] [ootaxa]
    - †Laevisoolithus sochavai Mikhailov 1991 [ootaxa]
    - †Subtiliolithus microtuberculatus Mikhailov 1991 [ootaxa]
    - †Tipoolithus achloujensis Garcia et al. 2003 [ootaxa]
  - †Linyiornis amoena Wang et al. 2016
  - †Monoenantiornis sihedangia Hu & O'Connor 2016
  - †Paraprotopteryx gracilis Zheng, Zhang & Hou 2007 (Early Cretaceous)
  - †Parvavis chuxiongensis Wang, Zhou & Xu 2014
  - †Piscivorenantiornis inusitatus Wang & Zhou 2017
  - †Pterygornis dapingfangensis Wang, Hu & Li 2015
  - †Xiangornis shenmi Hu et al. 2012 (Jiufotang Early Cretaceous of Liaoning)
  - †Yuanjiawaornis viriosus Hu et al. 2015
  - †Kurzholiidae Nesov 1992
    - †Kuszholia mengi Nesov 1992 (Late Cretaceous)
  - †Iberomesornithiformes Sanz & Bonaparte 1992
    - †Iberomesornithidae Sanz & Bonaparte 1992
      - †Iberomesornis romerali Sanz & Bonaparte 1992 (Early Cretaceous)
  - †Liaoningornithiformes Hou 1997
    - †Liaoningornithidae Hou 1997
      - †Eoalulavis hoyasi Sanz et al. 1996 (Early Cretaceous)
      - †Liaoningornis longidigitris Hou 1997
- Basal Euenantiornithes
  - †Catenoleimus anachoretus Panteleyev 1999 (Late Cretaceous)
  - †Cratoavis cearensis Carvalho et al. 2015
  - †Elbretornis bonapartei Walker & Dyke 2009 (Late Cretaceous)
  - †Eocathayornis walkeri Zhou 2002 [Eocathayornis walkeri Zhou 1999 (nomen nudum)] (Early Cretaceous)
  - †Flexomornis howei Tykoski & Fiorillo 2010 (Late Cretaceous)
  - †Fortunguavis xiaotaizicus Wang, O'Connor & Zhou 2014
  - †Grabauornis lingyuanensis Dalsatt, Erickson & Zhou 2014
  - †Huoshanornis huji Wang et al. 2010 (Late Cretaceous)
  - †Largirostrornis sexdentoris Hou 1997 (Early Cretaceous)
  - †Lectavis bretincola Chiappe 1993 (Late Cretaceous)
  - †Martinavis Walker, Buffetaut & Dyke, 2007 (Late Cretaceous)
    - †M. cruzyensis Walker, Buffetaut & Dyke, 2007
    - †M. vincei Walker, Buffetaut & Dyke, 2007
    - †M. minor Walker & Dyke, 2009
    - †M. saltariensis Walker & Dyke, 2009
    - †M. whetstonei Walker & Dyke, 2009
  - †Musivavis amabilis Wang et al., 2022 (Early Cretaceous)
  - †Yungavolucris brevipedalis Chiappe 1993 (Late Cretaceous)
  - †Liaoxiornithiformes Hou et al. 2002
    - †Liaoxiornithidae Hou & Chen 1999
      - †Liaoxiornis delicatus Hou & Chen 1999 [Lingyuanornis parvus Ji & Ji 1999] (Late Cretaceous)
  - †Pengornithidae Wang et al. 2014
    - †Chiappeavis magnapremaxillo O'Connor et al. 2016
    - †Eopengornis martini Wang et al. 2014
    - †Pengornis houi Zhou, Clarke & Zhang 2008 (Early Cretaceous)
    - †Parapengornis eurycaudatus Hu, O'Connor & Zhou 2015
  - †Protopterygiformes Zhou & Zhang 2006
    - †Protopterygidae Zhou & Zhang 2006
      - †Jibeinia luanhera Hou 2000 [Jibeinia luanhera Hou 1997 nomen nudum] (Early Cretaceous)
      - †Protopteryx fengningensis Zhang & Zhou 2000 (Early Cretaceous)
      - †Hebeiornis fengningensis Yan 1999
- †Eoenantiornithiformes Hou et al. 1999
  - †Eoenantiornithidae Hou et al. 1999
    - †Dapingfangornis sentisorhinus Li et al. 2006 (Early Cretaceous)
    - †Eoenantiornis buhleri Hou et al. 1999
  - †Bohaiornithidae Wang et al. 2014
    - †Beiguornis khinganensis Wang et al., 2022
    - †Bohaiornis guoi Hu et al. 2011
    - †Longusunguis kurochkini Wang et al. 2014
    - †Parabohaiornis martini Wang et al. 2014
    - †Shenqiornis mengi Wang et al. 2010 (Early Cretaceous)
    - †Sulcavis geeorum O'Connor et al. 2013 (Early Cretaceous)
    - †Zhouornis hani Zhang et al. 2013
- †Longipterygiformes Zhang et al. 2001 [Boluochiiformes Zhou & Zhang 2006; Longirostraviformes Zhou & Zhang 2006]
  - †Longipterygidae Zhang et al. 2001 [Boluochiidae Zhou & Zhang 2006; Longirostravidae Zhou & Zhang 2006]
    - †Boluochia zhengi Zhou 1995 (Early Cretaceous)
    - †Camptodontus yangi Li et al. 2010 non Dejean 1826 (Early Cretaceous)
    - †Longipteryx chaoyangensis Zhang et al. 2001 (Early Cretaceous)
    - †Longirostravis hani Hou et al. 2004 (Early Cretaceous)
    - †Otogornis genghisi Hou 1994 (Early Cretaceous)
    - †Rapaxavis pani Morschhauser et al. 2009 (Early Cretaceous)
    - †Shanweiniao cooperorum O'Connor et al. 2009 (Early Cretaceous)
    - †Shengjingornis yangi Li et al. 2012 (Early Cretaceous)
- †Cathayornithiformes Zhou, Jin & Zhang 1992 [Sinornithiformes Hou 1997; Euornithiformes Kuročkin 1996]
  - †Alethoalaornithidae Li et al. 2007
    - †Alethoalaornis agitornis Li et al. 2007 (Early Cretaceous)
  - †Concornithidae Kuročkin 1996
    - †Concornis lacustris Sanz & Buscalioni 1992 (Early Cretaceous)
    - †Qiliania graffini Ji et al. 2011 (Early Cretaceous)
    - †Noguerornis gonzalezi Lasaca-Ruiz 1989 (Early Cretaceous)
  - †Cathyornithidae Zhou, Jin & Zhang 1992 [Sinornithidae Hou 1997]
    - †Gracilornis jiufotangensis Li & Hou 2011 (Early Cretaceous)
    - †Longchengornis sanyanensis Hou 1997 (Early Cretaceous)
    - †Sinornis santensis Sereno & Rao 1992 (Early Cretaceous)
    - †Cathayornis Zhou, Jin & Zhang 1992 (Early Cretaceous)
- †Enantiornithiformes Chiappe 1992 non Walker 1981, Martin 1983 [Gobipterygiformes Elzanowski 1974; Alexornithiformes Brodkorb 1976]
  - †Avisauridae Brett-Surman & Paul 1985
    - †Cuspirostrisornis houi Hou 1997 (Early Cretaceous)
    - †Avisaurus Brett-Surman & Paul 1985 (Late Cretaceous)
    - †Bauxitornis mindszentyae (Late Cretaceous)
    - †Enantiophoenix electrophyla Cau & Arduini 2008 (Late Cretaceous)
    - †Halimornis thompsonae Chiappe, Lamb & Ericson 2002 (Late Cretaceous)
    - †Gettyia Atterholt et al., 2018 (Late Cretaceous)
    - †Intiornis inexpectatus (Late Cretaceous)
    - †Mirarce Atterholt et al., 2018 (Late Cretaceous)
    - †Mystiornis cyrili Kuročkin et al. 2011 (Early Cretaceous)
    - †Neuquenornis volans Chiappe & Calvo 1994 (Late Cretaceous)
    - †Soroavisaurus australis Chiappe 1993 (Late Cretaceous)
  - †Gobipterygidae Elzanowski 1974
    - †Gobipipus reshetovi Kuročkin, Chatterjee & Mikhailov 2013
    - †Gobipteryx minuta Elzanowski 1974 (Late Cretaceous)
    - †Vescornis hebeiensis Zhang, Ericson & Zhou 2004 (Early Cretaceous)
  - †Enantiornithidae Walker 1981
    - †Enantiornis leali Walker 1981 (Late Cretaceous)
    - †Gurilynia nessovi Kuročkin 1999 (Late Cretaceous)
    - †Wyleyia valdensis Harrison & Walker 1973 (Late Cretaceous)
    - †Nanantius Molnar 1986 (Early-?Late Cretaceous)
  - †Alexornithidae Brodkorb 1976
    - †Abavornis bonaparti Panteleyev 1998 (Late Cretaceous)
    - †Alexornis antecedens Brodkorb 1976 (Late Cretaceous)
    - †Explorornis Panteleyev 1998 (Late Cretaceous)
    - †Incolornis Panteleyev 1998 (Late Cretaceous)
    - †Kizylkumavis cretacea Nesov 1984 (Late Cretaceous)
    - †Lenesornis maltschevskyi (Nesov 1986) Kuročkin 1996 [Ichthyornis maltschevskyi Nesov 1986 non Marsh 1872] (Late Cretaceous)
    - †Sazavis prisca Nesov & Jarkov 1989 (Early Cretaceous)
    - †Zhyraornis Nesov 1984 (Late Cretaceous)

Note that Holtz (2011) also included Zhyraornis in his classification of euenantiornithines, though this genus is more often classified as an ornithuran. Holtz also placed Liaoningornis as an ornithuromorph, though more recent studies have placed it as a close relative of Eoalulavis.

== Basal Euornithes (extinct) ==
Also called "basal Ornithuromorpha". Essentially modern birds, except many still possess a few primitive features such as teeth or wing claws. These have the plowshare-shaped pygostyle and proper tail fan as seen in most living birds. The taxonomy of this group is confusing; the name "Ornithurae" was first proposed by Ernst Haeckel in 1866 and has been revised in meaning several times since.

The following is a list of primitive euornithian genera and those that cannot be confidently referred to any subgroups, following Holtz (2011).

- †Archaeorhynchus spathula Zhou & Zhang 2006
- †Changmaornis houi Wang et al. 2013
- †Gargantuavis philoinos Buffetaut & Le Loeuff 1998
- †Hollanda luceria Bell et al. 2009 [Hollandornis birdus Bell et al. 2009 (nomen nudum)]
- †Horezmavis eocretaceous Nesov 1983
- †Jianchangornis microdonta Zhou, Zhang & Li 2009
- †Jiuquanornis niui Wang et al. 2013
- †Juehuaornis zhangi Wang, Wang & Hu 2015
- †Palaeopteryx thomsoni Jensen 1981 (dinosaur)
- †Platanavis nana Nesov 1992
- †Schizooura lii Zhou, Zhou & O'Connor 2012
- †Tingmiatornis arctica Wang et al. 2017
- †Vorona berivotrensis Forster et al. 1996
- †Xinghaiornis lini Wang et al. 2013
- †Yumenornis huangi Wang et al. 2013
- †Zhongjianornis yangi Zhou, Zhang & Li 2009
- †Gansuidae Hou & Liu 1984
  - †Changzuiornis ahgmi Huang et al. 2017
  - †Gansus Hou & Liu 1984
  - †Iteravis huchzermeyeri Zhou, O'Connor & Wang 2014
  - †Khinganornis hulunbuirensis Wang et al. 2020
  - †Shuilingornis angelai Wang et al. 2024
- †Patagopterygidae Alvarenga & Bonaparte 1992
  - †Alamitornis minutus Agnolin & Martinelli 2009
  - †Patagopteryx deferrariisi Alvarenga & Bonaparte 1992
- †Hongshanornithidae O'Connor, Gao & Chiappe 2010
  - ?†Archaeornithura meemannae Wang et al. 2015
  - †Hongshanornis longicresta Zhou & Zhang 2005 (Early Cretaceous)
  - †Longicrusavis houi O'Connor, Gao & Chiappe 2010 (Early Cretaceous)
  - †Parahongshanornis chaoyangensis Li, Wang & Hou 2011 (Early Cretaceous)– ornithurine?
  - †Tianyuornis cheni Zheng et al. 2014
- †Chaoyangiiformes Hou 1997
  - †Chaoyangiidae Hou 1997 [Chaoyangornithidae Hou 1997]
    - †Chaoyangia beishanensis Hou & Zhang 1993
- †Songlingornithiformes [Aberratiodontiformes Gong, Hou & Wang 2004; Yanornithiformes Zhou & Zhang 2001; Yixianornithiformes Zhou & Zhang 2006]
  - †Songlingornithidae Hou 1997 [Aberratiodontidae Gong, Hou & Wang 2004; Chaoyangornithidae Hou 1997; Yanornithidae Zhou & Zhang 2001; Yixiaornithidae Zhou & Zhang 2006]
    - †Piscivoravis lii Zhou et al. 2013
    - †Songlingornis linghensis Hou 1997 (Early Cretaceous)
    - †Yixianornis grabaui Zhou & Zhang 2001 (Early Cretaceous)
    - †Yanornis Zhou & Zhang 2001 [Archaeoraptor Sloan 1999 (nomen nudum); Archaeovolans Czerkas & Xu 2002; Aberratiodontus Gong, Hou & Wang 2004] (Early Cretaceous)

Note that Holtz also included the genera Eurolimnornis, Holbotia, Palaeocursornis and Piksi as euornitheans, though they have since been re-identified as pterosaurs.

== Basal Ornithurae (extinct) ==
- Limenavis patagonica Clarke & Chiappe 2001 (Late Cretaceous)– paleognath?
- Palintropidae
  - Palintropus retusus (Marsh 1892) Brodkorb 1970 [Cimolopteryx retusa Marsh 1892; Apatornis retusus (Marsh 1892) Brodkorb 1962] (Late Cretaceous) (?Galliformes: Quercymegapodiidae)
- †Ambiortiformes Kuročkin 1982
  - †Ambiortidae Kuročkin 1982
    - †Ambiortus dementjevi Kuročkin 1982 (Late Cretaceous)
- †Apsaraviformes Kuročkin 1982
  - †Apsaravidae
    - †Apsaravis ukhaana Norell & Clarke 2001 (Late Cretaceous)
- †Ichthyornithiformes Marsh 1873 [Pteropappi Stejneger 1885]
  - †Apatornithidae Fürbringer 1888
    - †Apatornis celer (Marsh 1873) Marsh 1873 [Ichthyornis celer Marsh 1873] (Late Cretaceous)
    - †Guildavis tener (Marsh 1880) Clarke 2004 [Ichthyornis tener Marsh 1880] (Cretaceous of Wallace County, US)
    - †Iaceornis marshi Clarke 2004 (Late Cretaceous)
  - †Ichthyornithidae Marsh 1873
    - Ichthyornis Marsh 1872 [Angelinornis Kashin 1972; Colonosaurus Marsh 1872; Graculavus Marsh 1873 non Marsh 1872; Plegadornis Wetmore 1962 non Brehm 1855] (Late Cretaceous)
- †Hesperornithiformes Fürbringer 1888 (Large, toothed, loon-like diving birds)
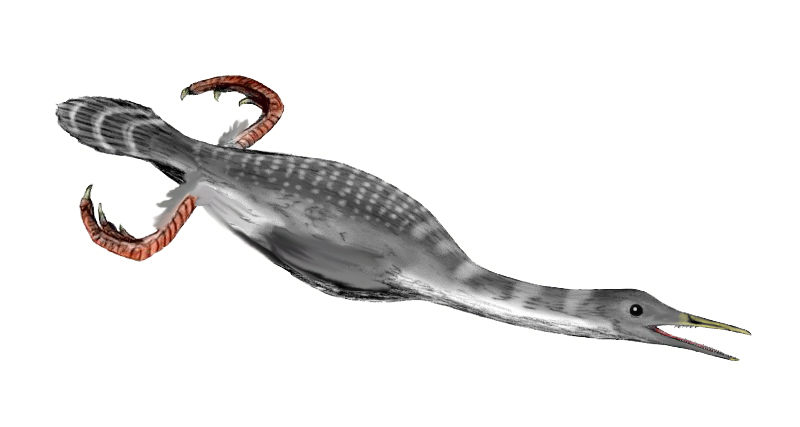
  Hesperornis
  - †Chupkaornis keraorum Tanaka et al. 2017
  - †Potamornis skutchi Elzanowski, Paul & Stidham 2000 (Late Cretaceous)
  - †Pasquiaornis Tokaryk, Cumbaa & Storer 1997 (Late Cretaceous)
  - †Enaliornithidae Fürbringer 1888
    - †Enaliornis Seeley 1876 [Palaeocolyntus (sic) Seeley 1864 nomen nudum; Palaeocolymbus Seeley 1869; Pelargonis (sic) Seeley 1864 nomen nudum; Pelagornis Seeley 1866 nomen nudum non Lartet 1857] (Early Cretaceous)
  - †Baptornithidae AOU 1910
    - †Baptornis Marsh 1877 [Parascaniornis Lambrecht 1933]
  - †Brodavidae Martin, Kuročkin & Tokaryk 2012
    - Brodavis Martin, Kuročkin & Tokaryk 2012 (Late Cretaceous)
  - †Judinornithidae Nesov 1983
    - †Judinornis nogontsavensis Nesov & Borkin 1983 (Late Cretaceous)
  - †Hesperornithidae Marsh 1880
    - †Fumicollis hoffmani Bell & Chiappe 2015
    - †Parahesperornis alexi Martin 1980 (Late Cretaceous)
    - †Hesperornis Marsh 1872 [Coniornis Marsh 1893; Lestornis Marsh 1876; Hargeria Lucas 1903; Asiahesperornis Nesov & Prizemlin 1991; Canadaga Hou 1999] (Late Cretaceous)

== Neornithes ==
The subclass that contains all modern birds.

Unresolved and basal forms
These modern birds are known from remains that cannot be placed in relation to any one modern group and are neither autapomorphic enough to assign them to own orders. Especially the Late Cretaceous/early Paleogene taxa are probably basal to several modern orders, while later Paleogene taxa often represent extinct lineages outside the modern families.

- †Australornis lovei Mayr & Scofield 2014 (late early Paleocene)
- †Gallornis straeleni Lambrecht 1931 (Late Cretaceous)
- †Ceramornis major Brodkorb 1963 (Late Cretaceous) – charadriiform?
- †"Presbyornithidae" gen. et sp. indet. (Barun Goyot Late Cretaceous of Udan Sayr, Mongolia) - anseriform (presbyornithid)?
- †Torotix clemensi Brodkorb 1963 (Late Cretaceous) – pelecaniform, charadriiform, procellariiform or phoenicopteriform
- Neornithes incerta sedis Kurochkin 1995 (Nemegt Late Cretaceous of S Mongolia) - phalacrocoracid?
- Neornithes incerta sedis AMNH FR 25272 (Lance Creek Late Cretaceous of Converse County, US) - phalacrocoracid?
- Neornithes incerta sedis PVPH 237 (Portezuelo Late Cretaceous of Sierra de Portezuelo, Argentina) - galliform?
- Neornithes incerta sedis UCMP 117598 (Hell Creek Late Cretaceous of Bug Creek West, US)
- Neornithes incerta sedis UCMP 117599 (Hell Creek Late Cretaceous of Bug Creek West, US) – anseriform?
- †"Lonchodytes" pterygius Brodkorb 1963 (Late Cretaceous/?Early Palaeocene) – charadriiform?
- †Novacaesareala hungerfordi Parris & Hope 2002 (Late Cretaceous/Early Palaeocene) – related to Torotix?
- †"Palaeotringa" vetus Marsh 1870 (Lance Late Cretaceous of Wyoming – Hornerstown Late Cretaceous/?Early Palaeocene of New Jersey, US) - gruiform? anseriform (presbyornithid)?
- †Volgavis marina Nessov & Jarkow 1989 (Early Palaeocene of Volgograd, Russia) – charadriiform? phalacrocoraciform?
- †Tshulia litorea Nessov 1988 (Late Paleocene of Zhylga, Kazakhstan)
- †Eupterornis remensis Lemoine 1878 (Paleocene of Cernay, France) – charadriiform (larid?)? gaviiform?
- †Gradiornis walbeckensis Mayr 2007 (Paleocene of Walbeck, Germany) – cariamid?
- †"Messelornis" russelli Mourer-Chauviré 1995 sensu Mayr 2007 (Paleocene of Cernay, France) – messelornithid?
- †Walbeckornis creber Mayr 2007 (Paleocene of Walbeck, Germany) – charadriiform? messelornithid?
- Neornithes incerta sedis (Late Paleocene/Early Eocene of Ouled Abdoun Basin, Morocco) – charadriiform, ciconiiform, gruiform?
- †Argillipes Harrison & Walker 1977 (London Clay Early Eocene of England) – galliform?
  - †A. aurorum Harrison & Walker 1977
  - †A. magnus Harrison & Walker 1979
  - †A. paralectoris Harrison & Walker 1977
- †Coturnipes cooperi Harrison & Walker 1977 (Early Eocene of England, and Virginia, US?)– galliform, falconiform?
- †Fluviatilavis antunesi Harrison 1983 (Early Eocene of Silveirinha, Portugal)– charadriiform?
- †Mopsitta tanta Waterhouse et al. 2008 (Early Eocene) – threskiornithid (may belong in Rhynchaeites), psittacid?
- †Neanis schucherti Shufeldt 1913 (Early Eocene)– coraciiform (primobucconid), piciform?
- †Paleophasianus meleagroides Wetmore 1940 (Willwood Early Eocene of Bighorn County, US)– galliform (tetraonine or cracid) or gruiform (aramid)?
- †Precursor parvus (Early Eocene)– several species? psittaciform (pseudasturid or psittacid) + charadriiform (glareolid)?
- †"Precursor" litorum Harrison & Walker 1977
- †"Precursor" magnus Harrison & Walker 1977
- †Procuculus minutus Harrison & Walker 1977 (Early Eocene of Bognor Regis, England)– cuculiform (parvicuculid), coraciiform (primobucconid), close to Primapus?
- †Pulchrapollia Dyke & Cooper 2000 (Early Eocene) – psittaciform (pseudasturid or psittacid)?
  - †P. gracilis Dyke & Cooper 2000
  - †P. olsoni (Feduccia & Martin 1976) [Primobucco olsoni Feduccia & Martin 1976]
- Neornithes incerta sedis USNM 496384 (Nanjemoy Early Eocene of Virginia, US)– parvicuculid? aegithalornithid?
- †Palaeopsittacus georgei Harrison 1982b (Early – middle Eocene of NW Europe) – caprimulgiform (podargid?) or quercypsittid?
- †Amitabha urbsinterdictensis Gulas-Wroblewski & Wroblewski 2003 (Bridger middle Eocene of Forbidden City, US) - galliform (phasianid) or gruiform (rallid?)?
- †Eociconia sangequanensis Hou 1989 (middle Eocene of China)– ciconiiform (ciconiid)?
- †Protocypselomorphus manfredkelleri Mayr 2005 (middle Eocene of Messel, Germany)– caprimulgiform, apodiform or ancestral to both
- †Pumiliornis tessellatus Mayr 1999 (middle Eocene of Messel, Germany)
- †Ludiortyx hoffmanni (Gervais 1852) Brunet 1970 (Late Eocene) – rallid, quercymegapodid? [Includes Tringa hoffmanni Gervais 1852; Palaeortyx blanchardi Milne-Edwards 1869; Palaeortyx hoffmanni (Gervais 1852); Ludiortyx blanchardi (Milne-Edwards 1869); Eortyx hoffmanni (Gervais 1852)]
- †Minggangia changgouensis Hou 1982 (Late Eocene of China) – rallid, threskiornithid?
- †Petropluvialis simplex Harrison & Walker 1976 (Late Eocene of England)– may be same as Palaeopapia; anseriform?
- †"Phasianus" alfhildae Shufeldt 1915 (Washakie B Late Eocene of Haystack Butte, US)– gruiform, ciconiiform, phoenicopteriform?
- †Telecrex grangeri Wetmore 1934 (Irdin Manha Late Eocene of Chimney Butte, Mongolia)– meleagrid or gruiform (rallid?)
- Neornithes incerta sedis AMNH FR 2941 (Irdin Manha Late Eocene of Chimney Butte, China) – falconiform (accipitrid)? gruiform (Eogrus)?
- †Zheroia kurochkini Nesov 1988 (Late Eocene of Kazakhstan) – gruiform? pelagornithid?
- †"Falco" falconellus Shufeldt 1915 (or falconella; Eocene of Wyoming, US) – falconiform (falconid)?
- †Agnopterus Milne-Edwards 1868 (Late Eocene– Late Oligocene of Europe)– phoenicopteriform or anseriform
  - †A. laurillardi Milne-Edwards 1868
  - †A. sicki Alvarenga 1990
  - †A. turgaiensis Tugarinov 1940 [Cygnopterus lambrechti Kuročkin 1968]
- †Plesiocathartes Gaillard 1908 (Late Eocene–? Early Miocene of SW Europe) - cathartid, leptosomid?
  - †P. europaeus Gaillard 1908
  - †P. gaillardi
  - †P. wyomingensis Weidig 2006
  - †P. major Weidig 2006
  - †P. geiselensis Mayr 2002
  - †P. kelleri Mayr 2002
- †Botauroides parvus Shufeldt 1915 (Eocene of Wyoming, US) – coliiform?
- †Aminornis excavatus Ameghino 1899 (Deseado Early Oligocene of Rio Deseado, Argentina) – gruiform (aramid)?
- †Ciconiopsis antarctica Ameghino 1899 (Deseado Early Oligocene of Patagonia, Argentina) – ciconiiform (ciconiid)?
- †Climacarthrus incompletus Ameghino 1899 (Deseado Early Oligocene of Argentina) – falconiform (accipitrid)? A nomen dubium
- †Cruschedula revola Ameghino 1899 (Deseado Early Oligocene of Golfo San Jorge, Argentina) Aves incertae sedis; A nomen dubium
- †Dolichopterus viator Milne-Edwards 1867 [Dolicopterus Aymard 1856 nomen nudum; Camaskelus Aymard 1856 nomen nudum; Camaskelus Milne-Edwards 1867; Dolicopterus viator Aymard 1856 nomen nudum; Camaskelus palustris Aymard 1856 nomen nudum; Camaskelus palustris Milne-Edwards 1867] (Early Oligocene of Ronzon, France) – charadriiform (charadriid)? Not Dolicopterus as sometimes claimed
- †Loncornis erectus Ameghino 1899 (Deseado Early Oligocene of Rio Deseado, Argentina)– gruiform (aramid)?
- †Loxornis clivus Ameghino 1894– anatid? (Deseado Early Oligocene of Argentina)
- †Manu antiquus Marples 1946 (Early Oligocene) – pelagornithid? procellariiform (diomedeid)?
- †Palaeocrex rex Wetmore 1927 (Early Oligocene of Trigonias Quarry, US) – gruiform (rallid)?
- †Palaeopapia eous >(Harrison & Walker 1976) Harrison & Walker 1979 [Howardia Harrison & Walker 1976 non Berlese & Leonardi 1896; Howardia eous Harrison & Walker 1976] (Hampstead Early Oligocene of Isle of Wight, England) – anseriform?
- †Paracygnopterus scotti Harrison & Walker 1979 (Early Oligocene of Belgium and England) – anseriform (anatid)?
- †"Pararallus" hassenkampi Martini 1967 (Sieblos Dysodil Early Oligocene of Sieblos, Germany)
- †Riacama caliginea Ameghino 1899 (Deseado Early Oligocene of Argentina) – gruiform?
- †Smiliornis penetrans Ameghino 1899 (Deseado Early Oligocene of Argentina)– gruiform?
- †Teracus littoralis Milne-Edwards 1871 [leracus Aymard 1856 nomen nudum; leracus littoralis Aymard 1856 nomen nudum] (Early Oligocene of France)
- †Teleornis impressus Ameghino 1899 (Deseado Early Oligocene of Argentina)– anatid?
- †Pseudolarus guaraniticus Ameghino 1899 (Deseado Early Oligocene – Miocene of Argentina) – gruiform?
- Neornithes incerta sedis BMNH PAL 4989 (Hampstead Early Oligocene of Isle of Wight, England) – formerly "Ptenornis" and included in Headonornis; anseriform?
- †"Anas" creccoides van Beneden 1871 (Early-mid Oligocene of Belgium) – anseriform?
- †"Charadrius" sheppardianus Cope 1881 (Florissant middle Oligocene of Florissant, US) – charadriiform (charadriid?)
- †Megagallinula harundinea Kuročkin 1968 (Indricotherium middle Oligocene of Chelkar-Teniz, Kazakhstan)
- †"Palaeorallus" alienus Kuročkin 1968 (middle Oligocene of Tatal-Gol, Mongolia)– galliform?
- †"Vanellus" selysii van Beneden 1871 (middle Oligocene of Rupelmonde, Belgium) – charadriiform (charadriid)?
- †Anserpica kiliani Mourer-Chauviré, Berthet & Hugueney 2004 (Late Oligocene of France) – gruiform (gruid?) or anseriform (anseranatid?)?
- †Gnotornis Wetmore 1942 (Brule Late Oligocene of Shannon County, US) – gruiform (aramid)?
  - †G. aramiellus Wetmore 1942
  - †G. roardeola
  - †G. walkeri
- †Guguschia nailiae Aslanova & Burčak-Abramovič 1968 (Late Oligocene of Pirəkəşkül, Azerbaijan) – anseriform (anserine)? pelagornithid (same as Caspiodontornis)?
- †Tiliornis senex Ameghino 1899 (Late? Oligocene of Argentina)– phoenicopteriform? A nomen dubium
- Neornithes incerta sedis QM F40203 (Late Oligocene of Riversleigh, Australia)– gruiform (rallid)?
- †Gaviella pusilla Shufeldt 1915 (Oligocene? of Wyoming, US)– gaviiform? plotopterid?
- †"Anas" skalicensis Bayer 1882 (Early Miocene of "Skalitz", Czech Republic) - anseriform?
- †Chenornis graculoides Portis 1884 (Early Miocene) - Anseriformes (Anatidae) or Pelecaniformes (Phalacrocoracidae)?
- †"Propelargus" olseni Brodkorb 1963 (Hawthorne Early Miocene of Tallahassee, US) – ciconiiform?
- Neornithes incerta sedis MNHN SA 1259-1263 (Early/Middle Miocene of Sansan, France) – passeriform?
- †Anisolornis excavatus Ameghino 1891 (Santa Cruz Middle Miocene of Karaihen, Argentina) – gruiform, galliform, tinamiform?
- †"Ardea" perplexa Milne-Edwards 1869 (Middle Miocene of Sansan, France) – ardeid? strigiform?
- †"Cygnus herrenthalsi" van Beneden 1871 (Middle Miocene of Belgium)
- †"Anas" risgoviensis Ammon 1918 (Late Miocene of Bavaria, Germany) – anseriform?
- †"Ardea" aureliensis (Late Miocene of France) – ardeid?
- †Eoneornis australis Ameghino 1895 nomen dubium (Miocene of Argentina) – anatid? A nomen dubium
- †Eutelornis patagonica Ameghino 1895 (Miocene of Argentina) – anatid?
- †Protibis cnemialis Ameghino 1891 (Miocene of Argentina) – ciconiiform (threskiornithid)?
- †"Limnatornis" paludicola Milne-Edwards 1871 (Miocene of France) – coliid? phoeniculid?
- †"Picus" gaudryi (Miocene of France) – piciform?
- †"Ardea" lignitum Giebel 1860 (Late Pliocene of Germany) – ardeid? strigid (genus Bubo)?
- †Bathoceleus hyphalus Brodkorb 1959 (Pliocene of New Providence, Bahamas) – picid?
- †"Homalopus" Milne-Edwards 1870 non Chevrolat 1837– piciform? Preoccupied by a subgenus of Cryptocephalus leaf beetles described in 1835.
- †"Liptornis hesternus" Ameghino 1894 [Liptornis cuvierii] – pelecaniform (pelecanid)? A nomen dubium
- †Proceriavis martini Harrison & Walker 1979 – pelagornithid?
- †Protopelicanus cuvieri Reichenbach 1852 – pelecaniform (pelecanid)? pelagornithid?
- †Eurofluvioviridavis robustipes Mayr 2005a (middle Eocene of Messel, Germany)
- †Archaeotrogonidae Wetmore 1926 – basal Cypselomorphae?
  - †Archaeotrogonidae gen. et sp. indet. (Early Eocene)
  - †Hassiavis laticauda Mayr 1998
  - †Archaeotrogon Milne-Edwards 1892 (Late Eocene/Early Oligocene)
- †Cimolopterygidae Brodkorb 1963 – charadriiform?
  - †Cimolopteryx Marsh 1892 (Late Cretaceous)
    - †C. rara Marsh 1890
    - †C. maxima Brodkorb 1963
  - †Lamarqueavis Agnolin 2010 (Late Cretaceous)
    - †L. australis Agnolin 2010
    - †L. minima (Brodkorb 1963) Agnolin 2010 [Cimolopteryx minima Brodkorb 1963]
    - †L. petra (Hope 2002) Agnolin 2010 [Cimolopteryx petra Hope 2002]
- †Cladornithidae Wetmore 1930 [Cladornithes Wetmore 1960; Cladornidae Ameghino 1895] (pelecaniform?
  - †Cladornis pachypus Ameghino 1895 (Deseado Early Oligocene of Patagonia, Argentina)
- †Eremopezidae Rothschild 1911 – pelecaniform? ratite?
  - †Eremopezus eocaenus Andrews 1904 (Late Eocene) - includes Stromeria fajumensis Lambrecht 1929
- †Gracilitarsidae Mayr 2001 – close to Sylphornithidae?
  - Eutreptodactylus itaboraiensis Baird & Vickers-Rich 1997 (Late Paleocene of Brazil) - a nomen dubium
  - Gracilitarsus mirabilis Mayr 1998 (middle Eocene of Messel, Germany)
- Halcyornithidae Harrison & Walker 1972 – psittaciform (= Pseudasturidae?), coraciiform?
  - †Halcyornis toliapicus (Koenig 1825) Owen 1846 (London Clay Early Eocene of England)
  - †Cyrilavis Martin 2010 (Green River Early Eocene of C US) - psittaciform (halcyornithid or psittacid)?
    - †C. olsoni (Feduccia & Martin 1976) Martin 2010 [Primobucco olsoni Feduccia & Martin 1976]
    - †C. colburnorum Ksepka, Clarke & Grande 2011
- †Juncitarsidae Peters 1987
  - †Kashinia magnum (Harrison & Walker 1976) Harrison & Walker 1979 [Tenuicrus Harrison & Walker 1976 non Womersley 1940; Tenuicrus magnum Harrison & Walker 1976] – phoenicopteriform?
  - †Juncitarsus Olson & Feduccia 1980 – phoenicopteriform?
- Laornithidae Cracraft 1973 – charadriiform? gruiform? pelagornithid?
  - Laornis edvardsianus Marsh 1870 [Laopteryx (sic) Kuročkin 1995] (Late Cretaceous?)
- †Lonchodytidae Brodkorb 1963
  - †Lonchodytes estesi Brodkorb 1963 (Late Cretaceous/?Early Palaeocene) – gaviiform/pelecaniform? procellariiform?
- †Palaeospizidae – passeriform? coraciiform? coliiform?
  - †Palaeospiza bella Allen 1878 (Late Eocene of Florissant Fossil Beds, US)
- †Parvicuculidae Harrison 1982 – cypselomorph, cuculiform, coraciiform (primobucconid)?
  - †Parvicuculus minor Harrison & Walker 1977 (Early Eocene of NW Europe)
- †Remiornithidae Martin 1992 (Paleocene of France) – palaeognath?
  - †Remiornis heberti Lemoine 1881 [Remiornis minor Lydekker 1891]
- †Sylphornithidae Mourer-Chauviré 1988 – cuculiform? coraciiform? close to Gracilitarsidae?
  - †Sylphornis bretouensis Mourer-Chauvire 1988 (middle Eocene of France)
  - †Oligosylphe mourerchauvireae Mayr & Smith 2002 (Borgloon Early Oligocene of Hoogbutsel, Belgium)
- †Tytthostonychidae Olson & Parris 1987 – procellariiform, pelecaniform?
  - †Tytthostonyx glauconiticus Olson & Parris 1987 (Late Cretaceous/Early Palaeocene)
- †Zygodactylidae Brodkorb 1971 [Primoscenidae Harrison 1977]– near passerine
  - †Eozygodactylus americanus Weidig 2010
  - †Zygodactylus Ballmann 1969 (Early Oligocene – Middle? Miocene of C Europe)
    - †Z. ignotus Ballmann 1969
    - †Z. luberonensis Mayr 2008
    - †Z. grivensis Ballmann 1969
  - †Primoscens minutus Harrison & Walker 1977
  - †Primozygodactylus Mayr 1998
    - †P. ballmanni Mayr 1998
    - †P. danielsi Mayr 1998
    - †P. major Mayr 1998
    - †P. eunjooae Mayr & Zelenkov 2009
- †"Graculavidae" Fürbringer 1888 [Dakotornithidae Erickson 1975; Scaniornithidae; Telmatornithidae Cracraft 1972] – a paraphyletic form taxon, the "transitional shorebirds"
  - †Limosavis Shufeldt 1915 [Graculavus Marsh 1872 non Marsh 1973] (Late Cretaceous –? Early Palaeocene) – charadriiform?
    - †L. velox (Marsh 1872) Lambrecht 1933 [Graculavus velox Marsh 1872]
    - †L. augustus (Hope 1999) [Graculavus augustus Hope 1999]
  - †Palaeotringa Marsh 1870 (Late Cretaceous/Early Palaeocene) – charadriiform?
  - †Telmatornis priscus Marsh 1870 [Telmatornis affinis Marsh 1870; Graculavus pumilis Marsh 1872; Palaeotringa vetus Marsh 1870] (Late Cretaceous?) – charadriiform? gruiform? podicipediform?
  - †Zhylgaia aestiflua Nesov 1988 (Early Paleocene) – presbyornithid?
  - †Scaniornis lundgreni Dames 1890 (Early/Middle Paleocene) – phoenicopteriform?
  - †Dakotornis cooperi Erickson 1975 (Paleocene of North Dakota, US)
  - †Placement unresolved
    - "Graculavidae" gen. et sp. indet. (Gloucester County, US)

=== Struthioniformes ===
Ostrich and related ratites.

- Struthionidae Vigors 1825 [†Struthiolithidae Vjalov 1971; †Palaeotididae Houde & Haubold 1987] (ostriches)
  - †Palaeotis weigelti Lambrecht 1928 [Palaeogrus geiseltalensis Lambrecht 1935; Ornitocnemus geiseltalensis (Lambrecht 1935) Brodkorb 1967] (middle Eocene)
  - †Remiornis heberti Lemoine 1881
  - †Orientornis linxiaensis (Hou et al. 2005) Wang 2008 [Struthio linxiaensis Hou et al. 2005]
  - Prehistoric species of extant genera
    - Struthio Linnaeus 1758 [†Palaeostruthio Burchak-Abramovich 1953; †Struthiolithus Brandt 1873 ootaxa; Struthio (Pachystruthio) Kretzoi 1954a; Megaloscelornis Lydekker 1879] (Early Miocene – Recent)

=== Casuariiformes ===
Cassowaries, emus and related ratites.

- Casuariidae Kaup 1847 [Dromaiidae Huxley 1868; Dramaiinae Gray 1870; Dramiceiidae Richmond 1908; Dramaeidae Newton 1896] (emus and cassowaries)
  - †Diogenornis fragilis Alvarenga 1983 (Early Eocene) – possible casuariiform
  - †Emuarius Boles 1992 (emuwaries) (Late Oligocene – Late Miocene)
  - Prehistoric species of extant genera
    - Dromaius Vieillot 1816 [Tachea Fleming 1822; Emou Griffith & Pidgeon 1829; Peronista Mathews 1912; Metapteryx De Vis 1892] (emus) (Middle Miocene – Recent)
    - Casuarius Brisson 1760 [Cela Moehring 1752 [Oken1816] non Reichenbach 1853 non Illiger 1826; Cela Moehring 1752 nom. rej.; Rhea Lacépède 1800 non Latham 1790; Chelarga Billberg 1828; Oxyporus Brookes 1828 non (Bourdot & Galzin 1925) Donk 1933; Thrasys Billberg 1828; Cassowara Perry 1811; Hippalectryo Gloger 1842]

=== Rheiformes ===
Rheas and related ratites.

- †Opisthodactylidae Ameghino 1895
  - †Opisthodactylus Ameghino 1895 (Miocene) – rheid?
- Rheidae (Bonaparte 1853) [Rheinae Bonaparte 1853] (rheas)
  - †Heterorhea dabbenei Rovereto 1914 (Pliocene)
  - †Hinasuri nehuensis Tambussi 1995
  - Prehistoric species of extant genera
    - Rhea Brisson 1760 [Rhea Moehring 1758 nomen dubium; Pterocnemia Gray 1870; Toujou Lacépède 1801; Tujus Rafinesque 1815]

=== †Dinornithiformes ===
Moas.

- †Megalapterygidae - (Upland moas)
  - †Megalapteryx didinus (Owen 1883) Haast 1886 [Palaeocasuarius Rothschild 1907 (Forbes 1892); Dinornis didinus Owen 1883; Megalapteryx benhami Archey 1941; Megalapteryx hamiltoni Rothschild 1907; Megalapteryx hectori Haast 1886; Megalapteryx tenuipes Lydekker 1891; Anomalopteryx didina (Owen 1883) Lydekker 1891; Palaeocasuarius velox Rothschild 1907; Palaeocasuarius elegans Rothschild 1907; Palaeocasuarius haasti Rothschild 1907]
- †Dinornithidae Owen 1843 [Palapteryginae Bonaparte 1854; Palapterygidae Haast 1874; Dinornithnideae Stejneger 1884] (great moas)
  - †Dinornis Owen 1843 [Palapteryx Owen 1846; Megalornis Owen 1843 non Gray 1841; Movia Reichenbach 1853; Moa Reichenbach 1853; Owenia Gray 1855; Tylopteryx Hutton 1891]
- †Emeidae (Bonaparte 1854) [Emeinae Bonaparte 1854; Anomalopterygidae Oliver 1930; Anomalapteryginae Archey 1941] (lesser moas)
  - †Anomalopteryx didiformis (Owen 1844) Reichenbach 1853 (Little bush moas)
  - †Emeus crassus (Owen 1846) Reichenbach 1853 (Eastern moas)
  - †Euryapteryx Haast 1874 (Broad-billed or turkey moas)
  - †Pachyornis Lydekker 1891 (Stout moas)

Two unnamed Saint Bathans Fauna species.

=== Apterygiformes ===
- Apterygidae Gray 1840 [Apteryginae Gray 1840] (Kiwis)
  - †Proapteryx micromeros Worthy et al. 2013

=== †Lithornithiformes Houde 1988 ===
- †Lithornithidae Houde 1988 (False tinamous)
  - †Fissuravis weigelti Mayr 2007
  - †Pseudocrypturus cercanaxius Houde 1988 (Green River Early/middle Eocene of C US)
  - †Paracathartes howardae Harrison 1979
  - †Lithornis Owen 1840 [Promusophaga Harrison & Walker 1977; Pediorallus Harrison 1984; Parvigyps Harrison & Walker 1977] (Paleocene – Early Eocene)

=== Tinamiformes ===
- Tinamidae Gray 1840 [Crypturidae Bonaparte 1831; Tinamotidae Bonaparte 1854; Eudromiidae Bonaparte 1854; Rhynchotidae von Boetticher 1934] (tinamous)
  - †Querandiornis romani Rusconi 1958 (Ensenada Early/Middle Pleistocene of Argentina)
  - †Roveretornis Brodkorb 1961
  - Tinamidae gen. et sp. indet. MACN-SC Fleagle Collection (Early – Middle Miocene of S Argentina) - at least 2 species
  - Prehistoric species of extant genera
    - Eudromia [non Eudromias Boie 1832; Calodromas Sclater & Salvin 1873 non Calodromus Guein 1832; Calopezus Ridgway 1884; Tinamisornis Rovereto 1914; Roveretornis Brodkorb 1961]
    - Nothura Wagler 1827 [†Cayetanornis Brodkorb 1963]
    - Crypturellus Brabourne & Chubb 1914 [Microcrypturus Chubb 1917; Crypturornis Oberholser 1922; Orthocrypturus Miranda-Ribeiro 1937]

=== Vegaviiformes ===
- †Neogaeornis wetzeli Lambrecht 1929 (Late Cretaceous)
- †Polarornis gregorii Chatterjee 2002 (Late Cretaceous)
- †Vegavis iaai Clarke et al. 2005 (Late Cretaceous)
- †Maaqwi cascadensis McLachlan, Kaiser, & Longrich, 2017 (Late Cretaceous)
- †Australornis lovei Mayr & Scofield, 2014 (Paleocene)

=== Anseriformes ===
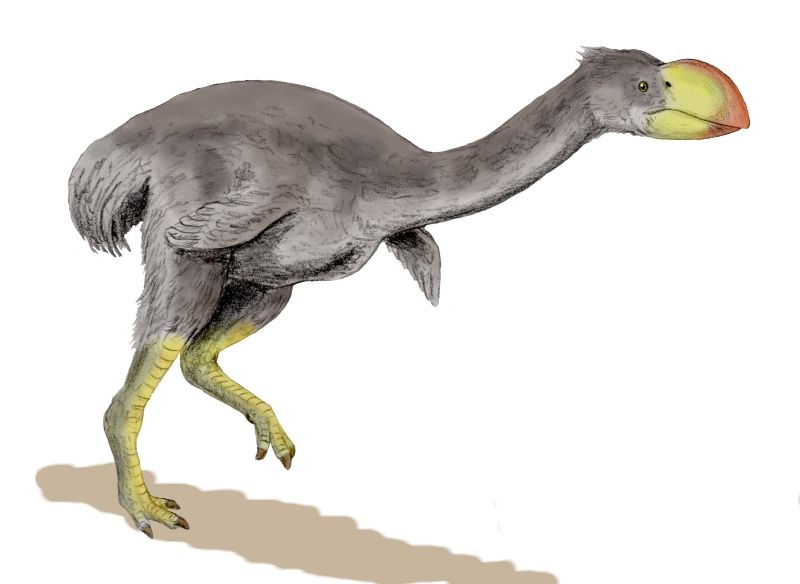
Dromornis

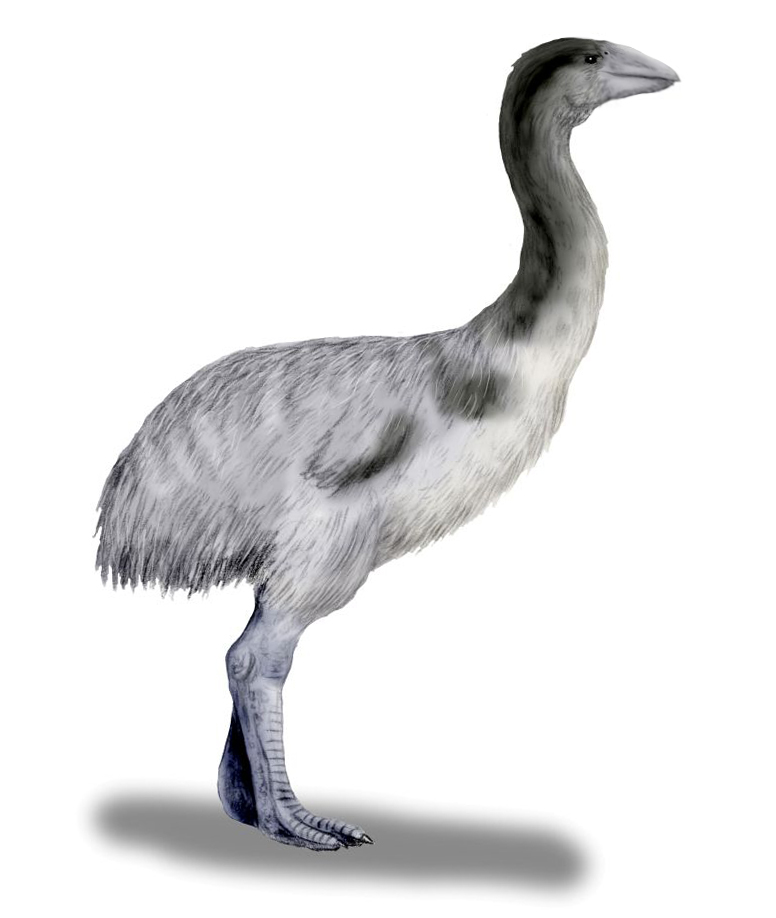
Genyornis

The group that includes modern ducks and geese.

- Basal and unresolved forms
  - †Anatalavis Olson & Parris 1987 [Nettapterornis Mlikovsky 2002] (Late Cretaceous/Early Paleocene– Early Eocene)– anseranatid or basal.
    - †A. rex (Shufeldt 1915) Olson & Parris 1987 [Telmatornis rex Shufeldt 1915]
    - †A. oxfordi Olson 1999 [Nettapterornis oxfordi (Olson 1999) Mlikovskmiy 2002]
  - †Romainvillia stehlini Lebedinský 1927 (Late Eocene/Early Oligocene)– anseranatide or anatide
  - †Saintandrea chenoides Mayr & De Pietri 2013
  - †Proherodius oweni Lydekker 1891 (Early Eocene) – presbyornithid?
  - †Paranyroca magna Miller & Compton 1939 (Early Miocene) – anatide or own family?
  - †Garganornis ballmanni Meijer 2014
- Anhimidae Stejneger 1885 [Palamedeinae Bonaparte 1831; Palamedeidae Gray 1840] (screamers)
  - †Chaunoides antiquus Alvarenga 1999
- †Dromornithidae Fürbringer 1888 – Australian mihirungs or "demon ducks"
  - †Barawertornis tedfordi Rich 1979 (Late Oligocene – Early Miocene)
  - †Bullockornis planei Rich 1979 (Demon-Duck of Doom) (Middle Miocene)
  - †Ilbandornis Rich 1979 (Late Miocene)
    - †I. woodburnei Rich 1979
    - †I. lawsoni Rich 1979
  - †Dromornis Owen 1872 (Late Miocene – Pliocene)
    - †D. australis Owen 1872
    - †D. stirtoni Rich 1979 (Stirton's Thunder Birds)
- Anseranatidae Sclater 1880 sensu Stejneger 1885 (magpie-geese
  - †Eoanseranas handae Worthy & Scanlon 2009 (Hand's Dawn Magpie Goose)
  - Anseranatidae gen. et sp. nov (Late Oligocene)
- †Presbyornithidae Wetmore 1926 [Telmabatidae Howard 1955]
  - †Teviornis gobiensis Kuročkin, Dyke & Karhu 2002 (Late Cretaceous)
  - †Headonornis hantoniensis (Lydekker 1891) Harrison & Walker 1976 [Agnopterus hantoniensis Lydekker 1891; Presbyornis hantoniensis (Lydekker 1891) Bocheński 1997; Ptenornis] – only BMNH PAL 30325 belongs to this bird, may belong to Presbyornis.
  - †Presbyornis Wetmore 1926 [Nautilornis Wetmore 1926; Coltonia Hardy 1959] (Paleocene– Early Oligocene)
    - †P. isoni Olson 1994
    - †P. mongoliensis Kuročkin & Dyke 2010
    - †P. recurvirostrus (Hardy 1959) Ericson 2000 [Coltonia recurvirostra Hardy 1959]
    - †P. pervetus Wetmore 1926 [Nautilornis avus Wetmore 1926; Nautilornis proavitus Wetmore 1926]
  - †Telmabates Howard 1955
    - †T. antiquus Howard 1955
    - †T. howardae Cracraft 1970
  - †Wilaru Boles et al. 2013
    - †W. tedfordi Boles et al. 2013
    - †W. prideauxi Vanesa et al. 2016
- Anatidae Leach 1820 [Cnemiornithidae Stejneger 1855; Cygnidae Kaup 1850 fide Gray; Anseridae Kaup 1850 fide Gray; Cereopsidae Kaup 1850 fide Gray; Fuligulidae Carus 1868; Merganidae Swainson 1837; Mergidae Gray 1840 fide 1871; Plectropteridae Carus; Erismaturidae Carus 1868; Tadornidae Carus 1868] (ducks, geese and swans)
  - †Allgoviachen tortonica Mayr, Lechner & Böhme, 2022 (Late Miocene)
  - †Annakacygna Matsuoka & Hasegawa 2022 (Late Miocene)
    - †A. hajimei Matsuoka & Hasegawa 2022
    - †A. yoshiiensis Matsuoka & Hasegawa 2022
  - †Bonibernicla ponderosa Kuročkin 1985 [Branta woolfendeni Bickart 1990]
  - †Eonessa anaticula Wetmore 1938 (Middle Eocene)
  - †Cygnavus (Early Oligocene – Early Miocene)
    - †C. senckenbergi Lambrecht 1931
    - †C. formosus Korochkin 1968
  - †Cygnopterus Lambrecht 1931 (middle Oligocene – Early Miocene)– sometimes included in Cygnavus
    - †C. neogradiensis Kessler & Hir 2009
    - †C. affinis (Beneden 1883) Lambrecht 1931 [Sula affinis Beneden 1883; Palaeopapia hamsteadiensis Harrison & Walker 1979b]
  - †Mionetta Livezey & Martin 1988 (Late Oligocene – Early Miocene)
    - †M. robusta (Milne-Edwards 1868) Mlíkovský 2002 [Anas robusta Milne-Edwards, 1868; Anserobranta robusta (Milne-Edwards 1868) Cheneval 1987]
    - †M. arvernensis (Lydekker 1891a) [Aythya arvernensis (Lydekker 1891a) Brodkorb 1964; Fuligula arvernensis Lydekker, 1891a]
    - †M. blanchardi (Milne-Edwards 1863) Livezey & Martin 1988 [Anas blanchardi Milne-Edwards 1863; Palaeortyx phasianoides Milne-Edwards 1869; Anas macroptera Milne-Edwards 1871 Nomen nudum; Taoperdix phasianoides (Milne-Edwards 1869) Brodkorb 1964; Dendrochen blanchardi (Milne-Edwards 1863) Cheneval 1983b]
    - †M. consobrina (Milne-Edwards 1867) Livezey & Martin 1988 [Anas consobrina Milne-Edwards 1867; Dendrochen consobrina (Milne-Edwards 1867) Cheneval 1983b]
    - †M. natator (Milne-Edwards 1867) Livezey & Martin 1988 [Anas natator Milne-Edwards 1867; Querquedula natator (Milne-Edwards 1867) Brodkorb 1962; Dendrochen natator (Milne-Edwards 1867) Cheneval 1983b]
  - †Notochen bannockburnensis Worthy et al., 2022 (Early Miocene)
  - †Australotadorna alecwilsoni Worthy 2009 (Late Oligocene – Early Miocene)
  - †Pinpanetta Worthy 2009 (Late Oligocene – Early Miocene)
    - †P. tedfordi Worthy 2009
    - †P. vickersrichae Worthy 2009
    - †P. fromensis Worthy 2009
  - †Dunstanetta johnstoneorum Worthy et al. 2007 (Johnstone's ducks) (Early/Middle Miocene)
  - †Manuherikia Worthy et al. 2007 (Early/Middle Miocene)
    - †M. lacustrina Worthy et al. 2007 (Manuherikia duck)
    - †M. minuta Worthy et al. 2007 (Minute Manuherikia duck)
    - †M. douglasi Worthy et al. 2008 (Douglas' duck)
  - †Matanas enrighti Worthy et al. 2007 (Enright's ducks) (Early/Middle Miocene)
  - †Miotadorna Worthy et al. 2007 (Early/Middle Miocene)
    - †M. sanctibathansi Worthy et al. 2007 (St. Bathans shelducks) (Early/Middle Miocene)
    - †M. catrionae Tennyson et al. 2022 (Catriona's shelduck) (late Early/early Middle Miocene) (synonym of M. sanctibathansi)
  - †Megalodytes morejohni Howard 1992 (Middle Miocene)
  - †Sinanas diatomas Yeh 1980 (Middle Miocene)
  - †Dendrochen Miller 1944 (Late Miocene)
    - †D. integra (Miller 1944) Cheneval 1987 [Querquedula integra Miller 1944; Anas integra (Miller 1944); Spatula integra (Miller 1944)]
    - †D. oligocaena (Tugarinov 1940) [Anas oligocaena Tugarinov 1940]
    - †D. robusta Miller 1944
  - †Presbychen abavus Wetmore 1930 (Late Miocene)
  - †Afrocygnus chauvireae Louchart et al. 2005 (Late Miocene – Early Pliocene)
  - †Balcanas pliocaenica (Early Pliocene) – may belong in Tadorna
  - †Wasonaka yepomerae Howard 1966 (Middle Pliocene)
  - †Paracygnus plattensis Short 1969 (Late Pliocene)
  - †Anabernicula Ross 1935 (Late Pliocene? – Late Pleistocene)
    - †A. minuscula (Wetmore 1924) [Branta minuscula Wetmore 1924] (Late Pliocene of Benson, Arizona)
    - †A. oregonensis Howard 1964b
    - †A. gracilenta Ross 1935
  - †Eremochen russelli Brodkorb 1961 (Pliocene)
  - †Tirarinetta kanunka Worthy 2008 (Pliocene)
  - †Brantadorna Howard 1964 (Middle Pleistocene)
    - †B. downsi Howard 1964
    - †B. robusta (Short 1970) Livezey 1997 [Anabernicula robusta Short 1970]
  - †Nannonetta invisitata Campbell 1979 (Late Pleistocene)
  - †Aldabranas cabri Harrison & Walker 1978 (Late Pleistocene)
  - †Ankonetta larriestrai Cenizo & Agnolín 2010
  - †Cayaoa bruneti Tonni 1979
  - †Chenoanas Zelenkov 2012
    - †C. asiatica Zelenkov et al. 2018
    - †C. deserta Zelenkov 2012
    - †C. sansaniensis (Milne-Edwards 1867) (Middle Miocene of Siberia and Late Miocene of France)
  - †Helonetta brodkorbi Emslie 1992
  - †Mioquerquedula minutissima Zelenkov & Kuročkin 2012 [Anas velox Milne-Edwards 1867; Anas meyerii Milne-Edwards, 1868; Nettion velox (Milne-Edwards 1868) Brodkorb 1964; Aythya meyerii (Milne-Edwards 1868) Brodkorb 1964] (Middle – Late? Miocene)
  - †Proanser major Umanskaya 1979
  - †Shiriyanetta hasegawai Watanabe & Matsuoka 2015
  - †Pleistoanser bravardi Agnolín 2006
  - †Lavadytis pyrenae Stidham & Hilton 2015
  - †Asiavis phosphatica Nesov 1986
  - †Nogusunna conflictoides Zelenkov 2011
  - †Sharganetta mongolica Zelenkov 2011
  - †Protomelanitta Zelenkov 2011
    - †P. gracilis Zelenkov 2011
    - †P. shihuibas (Hou 1985) Zelenkov 2012 [Aythya shihuibas Hou 1985]
  - †Bambolinetta lignitifila (Portis 1884) Mayr & Pavia 2014 [Anas lignitifila Portis 1884] (Early Pliocene of Monte Bamboli, Italy)
  - †Heteroanser vicinus (Kuročkin 1976) Zelenkov 2012 [Heterochen vicinus Kuročkin 1976; Anser vicinus (Kuročkin 1976) Mlíkovský & Švec 1986]
  - Placement unresolved
    - †"Anas" albae Jánossy 1979 (Late Miocene) – formerly in Mergus
    - †"Anas" amotape Campbell 1979
    - †"Anas" eppelsheimensis Lambrecht 1933 (Early Pliocene)
    - †"Anas" isarensis Lambrecht 1933 (Late Miocene)
    - †"Anas" luederitzensis (Early Miocene)
    - †"Anas" sanctaehelenae Campbell 1979
    - †"Anser" scaldii [Anser scaldii Beneden 1872 nomen nudum; "Anas" scaldii] (Late Miocene)
    - †"Aythya" chauvirae (Middle Miocene) – 2 species
    - †"Chenopis" nanus De Vis 1905 (Pleistocene) – at least 2 taxa, may be living species
    - †"Cygnopterus" alphonsi Cheneval 1984
    - †"Oxyura" doksana Mlíkovský 2002 (Early Miocene)
    - †"cf. Megalodytes" (Middle Miocene)
    - †Anatidae gen. et sp. indet. MNZ S42797 (Early/Middle Miocene)
    - †Anatidae gen. et spp. indet. (Middle Miocene)
    - †Anatidae gen. et spp. indet. (Late Miocene)
  - Prehistoric species of extant genera
    - Biziura Stephens 1824
      - †B. exhumata DeVis 1889
      - †B. delautouri Forbes 1892 [Biziura lobata delautouri (Forbes 1892)] (New Zealand musk duck)
    - Dendrocygna
      - †D. eversa Wetmore 1924
      - †D. valdipinnis DeVis 1888
      - †D. soporata (Kuročkin 1976) Mlíkovský & Švec 1986 [Anas soporata Kuročkin 1976]
    - Somateria (middle Oligocene – Recent)
    - Bucephala
      - †B. cereti Boeuf & Mourer-Chauviré 1992
    - Clangula
      - †C. matraensis Kessler 2009
    - Aix
      - †A. praeclara Zelenkov & Kuročkin 2012
    - Cygnus
      - †C. mariae Bickart 1990
      - †C. csakvarensis (Lambrecht 1933) Mlíkovský 1992 [Cygnus csákvárensis Lambrecht 1931a nomen nudum; Cygnanser csakvarensis (Lambrecht 1933) Kretzoi 1957; Olor csakvarensis (Lambrecht 1933) Mlíkovský 1992b]
      - †C. liskunae (Kuročkin 1976) [Anser liskunae Kuročkin 1976]
      - †C. atavus (Fraas 1870) Mlíkovský 1992 [Anas atava Fraas 1870; Anas cygniformis Fraas 1870; Palaelodus steinheimensis Fraas 1870; Anser atavus (Fraas 1870) Lambrecht 1933; Anser cygniformis (Fraas 1870) Lambrecht 1933]
      - †C. paloregonus Cope 1878 [Anser condoni Schufeldt 1892; Cygnus matthewi Schufeldt 1913]
      - †C. hibbardi Brodkorb 1958
      - †C. lacustris (De Vis 1905) [Archaeocygnus lacustris De Vis 1905]
      - †C. verae Boev 2000
    - Chloephaga
      - †C. robusta Tambussi 1998
    - Histrionicus
      - †Histrionicus shotwelli (Brodkorb 1961) [Ocyplonessa shotwelli Brodkorb 1961]
    - Mergus
      - †M. connectens Jánossy 1972
      - †M. minor Kessler 2009
      - †M. miscellus Alvarez & Olson 1978
    - Anas
      - †A. elapsa DeVis 1888 [Nettion elapsum (DeVis 1888)] (Chinchilla Late Pleistocene of Condamine River, Australia) ("Nettion")
      - †A. gracilipes DeVis 1905 [Nettion gracilipes (DeVis 1905)] (Late Pleistocene of Australia) ("Nettion")
      - †A. moldovica (Late Pliocene of Tchichmiknaia, Moldova?Georgia?)
      - †A. strenuum (Late Pleistocene of Patteramordu, Australia) ("Nettion")
      - †A. kisatibiensis [Anser kisatibiensis] (Early Pliocene of Kisatibi, Georgia)
      - †A. lambrechti (Spillman 1942) [Archeoquerquedula lambrechti Spillman 1942; Archaeoquerquedula (sic) lambrechti Stephens; Querquedula lambrechti (Spillman 1942)](Late? Pleistocene of Santa Elena peninsula, Ecuador)
      - †A. itchtucknee McCoy 1963
      - †A. kurochkini Zelenkov & Panteleyev 2015
      - †A. pullulans (Brodkorb 1961)
      - †A. schneideri Emslie 1985
      - †A. bunkeri (Wetmore 1944) [Nettion bunkeri Wetmore 1944]
      - †A. greeni (Brodkorb 1964) [Nettion greeni Brodkorb 1964]
      - †A. ogallalae (Brodkorb 1962) [Nettion ogallalae Brodkorb 1962]
      - †A. cheuen Agnolín 2006
    - Anser
      - †A. arenosus Bickart 1990
      - †A. arizonae Bickart 1990
      - †A. azerbaidzhanicus Serebrovsky 1940
      - †A. devjatkini Kuročkin 1971
      - †A. djuktaiensis Zelenkov & Kuročkin 2014
      - †A. eldaricus Burchak-Abramovich & Gadzyev 1978
      - †A. oeningensis (Meyer 1865) Milne-Edwards 1867b [Anas oeningensis Meyer 1865]
      - †A. pratensis (Short 1970) [Heterochen pratensis Short 1970]
      - †A. tchikoicus Kuročkin 1985
      - †A. thompsoni Martin & Mengel 1980
      - †A. thraceiensis Burchak-Abramovich & Nikolov 1984
      - †A. pressa (Brodkorb 1964) [Chen pressa Brodkorb 1964] (Dwarf Snow goose)
      - †A. udabnensis Burchak-Abramovich 1957
    - Aythya
      - †A. chauvirae Cheneval 1987
      - †A. denesi (Kessler 2013) Zelenkov 2016 [Anas denesi Kessler 2013]
      - †A. effodiata (DeVis 1905) [Nyroca effodiata DeVis 1905]
      - †A. magna Kuročkin 1985
      - †A. molesta (Kuročkin 1985) Zelenkov 1985 [Anas molesta Kuročkin 1985]
      - †A. reclusa (DeVis 1888) [Nyroca reclusa DeVis 1888]
      - †A. robusta (DeVis 1888) [Nyroca robusta DeVis 1888]
      - †A. spatiosa Kuročkin 1976
    - Branta
      - †B. dickey Miller 1924
      - †B. esmeralda Burt 1929
      - †B. howardae Miller 1930
      - †B. hypsibata (Cope 1878) [Anser hypsibata Cope 1878]
      - †B. propinqua Schufeldt 1892
      - †B. thessaliensis Boev & Koufos 2006
    - Oxyura
      - †O. bessomi Howard 1963
      - †O. hulberti Emslie 1992
      - †O. zapatanima Alvarez 1977
    - Chendytes
      - †O. milleri Howard 1955 (Early Pleistocene of San Nicolás Island US)
    - Lophodytes (Late Pleistocene – Recent)
    - Neochen
      - †N. barbadiana Brodkorb 1965
      - †N. debilis (Ameghino 1891) [Chenalopex debilis Ameghino 1891]
      - †N. pugil (Winge 1888) [Chenalopex pugil Winge 1888]
    - Tadorna
      - †T. minor Kessler & Hir 2012
      - †T. petrina Kuročkin 1985

=== Galliformes ===
The group that includes domestic chickens and their relatives.

- Placement unresolved
  - †Archaealectrornis sibleyi Crowe & Short 1992 (Oligocene) - phasianid?
  - †Archaeophasianus Lambrecht 1933 (Oligocene? - Late Miocene) - tetraonid or phasianid
    - †A. mioceanus (Shufeldt 1915) [Phasianus mioceanus Shufeldt 1915]
    - †A. roberti (Stone 1915) [Phasianus roberti Stone 1915]
  - †Austinornis lentus (Marsh 1877b) Clarke 2004 [Graculavus lentus Marsh 1877b; Ichthyornis lentus (Marsh 1877b) Marsh 1880; Pedioecetes lentus (Marsh 1877b); Pedioecetes phasianellus (Linnaeus 1758) Shufeldt 1915; Tetrao phasianellus Linnaeus 1758] - (Late Cretaceous) tentatively placed here;
  - †Chambiortyx cristata Mourer-Chauviré et al. 2013
  - †"Cyrtonyx" tedfordi (Miller 1952) (Late Miocene)
  - †Linquornis gigantis Yeh 1980 (middle Miocene)
  - †Namaortyx sperrgebietensis Mourer-Chauviré, Pickford & 2011
  - †Palaealectoris incertus Wetmore 1930 (Early Miocene) - tetraonid?
  - †Palaeoalectoris songlinensis Hou 1987 (middle Miocene)
  - †Palaeonossax senectus Wetmore 1956 (Late Oligocene) - cracid?
  - †Palaeortyx Milne-Edwards 1869 [Palaeoperdix Milne-Edwards 1869; Proalector Brodkorb 1964] (middle Eocene -? Early Pliocene) - phasianid or odontophorid
    - †P. media Milne-Edwards 1871 (nomen nudum)
    - †P. volans Göhlich & Pavia 2008
    - †P. gallica Milne-Edwards 1869 non Lydekker 1891 [Rallus dasypus Milne-Edwards 1892; Quercyrallus dasypus (Milne-Edwards) Lambrecht 1933; Taoperdix gallica (Milne-Edwards) Brodkorb 1964; ?Palaeortyx intermedia Ballmann 1969b; Coturnix gallica (Milne-Edwards) Mlýkovský 2002a]
    - †P. brevipes Milne-Edwards 1869 emend. Paris 1912 [Palaeortyx ocyptera Milne-Edwards 1892; Palaeortyx grivensis Lydekker 1893 non Ballmann 1969a; Plioperdix grivensis (Lydekker 1893) Brodkorb 1964; Palaeortyx cayluxensis Lydekker 1891 non Milne-Edwards 1892 emend. Gaillard 1908; Taoperdix brevipes (Milne-Edwards 1869) Brodkorb 1964]
    - †P. prisca (Milne-Edwards 1869) [Alectoris prisca (Milne-Edwards 1869) Mlýkovský 2002a; Palaeoperdix prisca Milne-Edwards 1869 emend. Göhlich & Mourer-Chauviré 2005; Palaeoperdix sansaniensis Milne-Edwards 1869; Palaeocryptonyx grivensis Ennouchi 1930]
    - †P. phasianoides Milne-Edwards 1869 [Palaeoperdix longipes Milne-Edwards 1869; Palaeortyx longipes (Milne-Edwards 1869) Mlíkovský 2000e; Coturnix longipes (Milne-Edwards 1869) Mlíkovský 2002; Palaeocryptonyx gaillardia Ennouchi 1930; Proalector gaillardia (Ennouchi 1930) Brodkorb 1964; Palaeortyx phasianoides grivensis Ballmann 1969a non Lydekker 1893b; Taoperdix phasianoides (Milne-Edwards 1869) Brodkorb 1964]
    - †P. joleaudi Ennouchi 1930 [Plioperdix joleaudi (Ennouchi 1930) Brodkorb 1964; Palaeortyx depereti Ennouchi 1930; Plioperdix depereti (Ennouchi 1930) Brodkorb 1964]
  - †Procrax brevipes Tordoff & Macdonald 1957 (middle Eocene? - Early Oligocene) - cracid? gallinuloidid?
  - †Shandongornis Yeh 1997 (middle Miocene)
    - †S. shanwanensis Yeh 1997
    - †S. yinansis Hou 2003
  - †Sobniogallus albinojamrozi Tomek et al. 2014
  - †Taoperdix Milne-Edwards 1869 (Late Oligocene) - gallinuloidid?
    - †T. pesseiti (Gervais 1862) [Tetrao pessieti Gervais 1862]
    - †T. miocaena (Gaillard 1939) Ballmann 1969 [Palaeortyx miocaena Gaillard 1939]
  - Galliformes gen. et sp. indet. MCZ 342506 (Oligocene) - formerly in Gallinuloides; phasianid?
- †Gallinuloididae Lucas 1900
  - †Gallinuloides wyomingensis Eastman 1900 (Early/middle Eocene)
  - †Paraortygoides Mayr 2000 (London Clay Early Eocene of Walton-on-the-Naze, England – middle Eocene of Messel, Germany)
    - †P. messelensis Mayr 2000
    - †P. radagasti Dyke & Gulas 2002
- †Paraortygidae Mourer-Chauviré 1992
  - †Pirortyx major (Gaillard 1939) Brodkorb 1964 [Palaeortyx major Gaillard 1939]
  - †Scopelortyx klinghardtensis Mourer-Chauviré, Pickford & Senut 2015
  - †Paraortyx Gaillard 1908 sensu Brodkorb 1964
    - †P. lorteti Gaillard 1908 [Palaeortyx cayluxensis Lydekker 1891; Palaeortyx gaillardi Lambrecht 1933; Ludiortyx gaillardi (Lambrecht 1933) Brodkorb 1964]
    - †P. brancoi Gaillard 1908
- †Quercymegapodiidae Mourer-Chauviré 1992
  - †Taubacrex granivora dAlvarenga 1988 (Late Oligocene/Early Miocene of Brazil)
  - †Ameripodius Alvarenga 1995 (Late Oligocene – Early Miocene of Brazil and France)
    - †A. silvasantosi Alvarenga 1995
    - †A. alexis Mourer-Chauviré 2000
  - †Quercymegapodius Mourer-Chauviré 1992 (middle Eocene – Early Oligocene)
    - †Q. depereti (Gaillard 1908) [Palaeocryptonyx depereti Gaillard 1908]
    - †Q. brodkorbi Mourer-Chauviré 1992
- Megapodidae – megapodes
  - †Ngawupodius minya Boles & Ivison 1999
  - Prehistoric species of extant genera
    - †Leipoa gallinacea – formerly Chosornis, Palaeopelargus, Progura
- Cracidae – guans and curassows
  - †Boreortalis laesslei Brodkorb 1954 (Early Miocene) – may be same as Ortalis
  - Extant genera present in the fossil record
    - Ortalis (Early Miocene – Recent)
      - †O. affinis Feduccia & Wilson 1967
      - †O. phengites Wetmore 1923
      - †O. pollicaris Miller 1944
      - †O. tantala Wetmore 1933
- Odontophoridae – New World quails
  - †Nanortyx inexpectatus Weigel 1963 (Cypress Hills Early Oligocene of North Calf Creek, Canada)
  - †Neortyx peninsularis Holman 1961 (Early Pleistocene of Reddick, US)
  - †Miortyx Miller 1944 (Rosebud Early Miocene of Flint Hill, US)
    - †M. teres Miller 1944
    - †M. aldeni Howard 1966
  - Placement unresolved
    - Odontophoridae gen. et sp. indet. KUVP 9393 (White River Early/middle Oligocene of Logan County, US)
  - Prehistoric species of extant genera
    - †Cyrtonyx cooki Gutierrez et al. 1981 (Late Miocene? of Upper Sheep Creek, US)
    - †Callipepla shotwelli (Brodkorb 1958) [Lophortyx shotwelli Brodkorb 1958] (Middle Pliocene of McKay Reservoir, US)
    - †Colinus hibbardi Wetmore 1944 (Rexroad Late Pliocene of Rexroad, US)
    - †Colinus suilium Brodkorb 1959 (Early Pleistocene of SE US)
    - †Colinus sp. (Late Pliocene of Benson, US)
    - †Dendrortyx? sp. (Late Pleistocene of San Josecito Cavern, Mexico)
- Phasianidae – pheasants, quails, partridges, grouse and turkeys
  - †Bantamyx georgicus Kuročkin 1982
  - †Centuriavis lioae Ksepka et al., 2022
  - †Diangallus mious Hou 1985
  - †Lophogallus naranbulakensis Zelenkov & Kuročkin 2010
  - †Megalocoturnix cordoni Sánchez Marco 2009 (Early Pliocene of Layna, Spain)
  - †Miophasianus Brodkorb 1952 [Miophasianus Lambrecht 1933 nomen nudum; Miogallus Lambrecht 1933]
    - †M. maxima (Lydekker 1893) Brodkorb 1964 [Palaeortyx maxima Lydekker 1893]
    - †M. altus (Milne-Edwards 1869) Villalta & Crusafont 1950 [Phasianus altus Milne-Edwards 1869; Miogallus altus (Milne-Edwards 1869) Mlíkovský 2002; Phasianus Desnoyersii Milne-Edwards 1869; Ardea similis Fraas 1870; Tantalus milne-edwardsii Shufeldt 1896; Pseudotantalus Milne-Edwardsi (Shufeldt 1896) Sharpe; Gallus longaevus Ammon 1918; Phasianus augustus Ammon 1918; Botaurites similis (Fraas 1870) Lambrecht 1933; Miophasianus augustus (Ammon 1918) Lambrecht 1933; Miophasianus desnoyersii (Milne-Edwards 1869) Lambrecht 1933; Miogallus longaevus (Ammon 1918) Lambrecht 1933; Proardea similis (Ammon 1870) Gaillard 1939; Ibis milne-edwardsi (Shufeldt 1896) Brodkorb 1963c]
    - †M. medius (Milne-Edwards 1869) Lambrecht 1933 [Phasianus medius Milne-Edwards 1869; Palaeoperdix medius (Milne-Edwards 1869) Cheneval 2000]
  - †Proagriocharis kimballensis Martin & Tate 1970 (Kimball Late Miocene/Early Pliocene of Lime Creek, US)
  - †Palaeocryptonyx Depéret 1892 [Chauvireria Boev 1997; Pliogallus Tugarinov 1940b non Gaillard 1939; Lambrechtia Janossy 1974] (Late Pliocene of SW Europe)
    - †P. donnezani Depéret 1892 [Francolinus Čapeki Lambrecht 1933; Pliogallus coturnoides Tugarinov 1940b; Plioperdix coturnoides (Tugarinov 1940b) Kretzoi 1955b; Francolinus capeki wenzensis Jánossy 1974a; Francolinus capeki villányiensis Jánossy 1974a; Francolinus (Lambrechtia) capeki (Lambrecht 1933) Jánossy 1974a; Alectoris baryosefi Tchernov 1980; Francolinus wezensis (Jánossy 1974a) Jánossy 1981; Plioperdix capeki (Lambrecht 1933) Mlíkovský 1995b; Alectoris donnezani (Depéret 1892) Mlíkovský 2002; Chauvireria balcanica Boev 1997a]
    - †P. grivensis Ennouchi 1930
    - †P. novaki Sánchez Marco 2009
    - †P. edwardsi (Depéret 1887) Ballmann 1969a [Palaeortyx edwardsi Depéret 1887; Palaeortyx miocaena Gaillard 1939; Taoperdix miocaena (Gaillard 1939) Ballmann 1969; Palaeoperdix edwardsi (Depéret 1887) Brodkorb 1964; Alectoris edwardsi (Depéret 1887) Mlíkovský 2002]
    - †P. minor (Jánossy 1974) [Francolinus minor Jánossy 1974; Ammoperdix ponticus Tugarinov 1940b; Pliogallus ponticus (Tugarinov 1940); Plioperdix ponticus (Tugarinov 1940) Kuročkin 1985; Francolinus (Lambrechtia) minor Jánossy 1974a]
    - †P. subfrancolinus (Jánossy 1976b) [Francolinus subfrancolinus Jánossy 1976b; Plioperdix subfrancolinus (Jánossy 1976b) Mlíkovský 1995b]
  - †Pliogallus Běljajeva 1948
    - †P. coturnoides Běljajeva 1948
    - †P. csarnotanus Kessler & Horváth 2022
  - †Plioperdix Kretzoi 1955 [Pliogallus Gaillard 1939 non Tugarinov 1940]
    - †P. crassipes (Gaillard 1939) [Pliogallus crassipes Gaillard 1939]
    - †P. kormosi (Gaillard 1939) [Pliogallus kormosi Gaillard 1939]
    - †P. africana Mourer-Chauviré & Geraads 2010
    - †P. hungarica (Jánossy 1991) Zelenkov & Panteleyev 2014 [Palaeocryptonyx hungaricus Jánossy 1991]
  - †Rustaviornis georgicus Burchak-Abramovich & Meladze 1972
  - †Rhegminornis calobates Wetmore 1943 (Early Miocene of Bell, US)
  - †Schaubortyx keltica (Eastman 1905) Brodkorb 1964 [Taoperdix keltica Eastman 1905] (middle Eocene – Early Oligocene)
  - †Shandongornis Yeh 1997
    - †S. shanwanensis Yeh 1997
    - †S. yinansis Hou 2003
  - †Shanxiornis fenyinis Wang et al. 2006
  - †Tologuica Zelenkov & Kuročkin 2009 (Middle Miocene of Sharga, Mongolia)
    - †T. aurorae Zelenkov & Kuročkin 2009
    - †T. karhui Zelenkov & Kuročkin 2009
  - Placement unresolved
    - Tetraoninae gen. et sp. indet. (Sajóvölgyi Middle Miocene of Mátraszõlõs, Hungary)
    - Meleagridae gen. et sp. indet. (Late Miocene of Westmoreland County, US)
    - "Tympanchus" stirtoni Miller 1944 (Early Miocene of South Dakota)
    - "Tympanuchus" lulli Shuefeldt 1915 (Pleistocene? of New Jersey)
  - Extant genera present in the fossil record
    - Coturnix (Late Oligocene – Recent)
    - Bambusicola (Late Miocene – Recent)
      - †B. dalianensis (Hou 1990) [Tetrastes dalianensis Hou 1990]
      - †B. nini Sánchez Marco 2009
      - †B. praebonasia (Jánossy 1974) Bocheński 1991 [Tetrastes praebonasia Jánossy 1974]
    - Phasianus (Late Miocene)
      - †P. lufengia Hou 1985
      - †P. yanshansis Huang & Hou 1984
    - Crossoptilon
      - †C. jiai Hou 1982
    - Lophura
      - †L. wayrei Harrison & Walker 1982
    - Gallus (Late Miocene/Early Pliocene – Recent)
      - †G. aesculapii Jánossy 1976
      - †G. beremendensis Jánossy 1977
      - †G. georgicus
      - †G. imereticus
      - †G. karabachensis Baryšnikov & Potapova 1995 (Giant junglefowl)
      - †G. kudarensis Burčak-Abramovič & Potapova
      - †G. meschtscheriensis
      - †G. tamanensis
    - Lagopus (Early? Pliocene – Recent)
      - †L. atavus Jánossy 1974
      - †L. balcanicus Boev 1995
      - †L. lagopus noaillensis Mourer-Chauviré 1975
      - †L. muta correzensis Mourer-Chauviré 1975
    - Meleagris (Early Pliocene – Recent)
      - †M. celer Marsh 1872
      - †M. tridens Wetmore 1931
      - †M. progenes (Brodkorb 1964) [Agriocharis progenes Brodkorb 1964]
      - †M. leopoldi
      - †M. anza (Howard 1963) [Agriocharis anza Howard 1963]
      - †M. crassipes Rea 1980
    - Pavo (Early Pliocene – Recent)
      - †P. bravardi (Gervais 1849) [Gallus moldovicus Abramovich, Ganea & Shushpanov 1993]
    - Tetrao (Early Pliocene – Recent)
      - †T. conjugens Jánossy 1974
      - †T. macropus Jánossy 1976
      - †T. partium (Kretzoi 1962)
      - †T. praeurogallus Jánossy 1969
      - †T. rhodopensis Boev 1998
    - Lyrurus
      - †Lyrurus tetrix longipes
    - Francolinus (Late Pliocene – Recent)
      - †F. capeki Jánossy 1974
      - †F. villanyiensis Jánossy 1974
      - †F. wenzensis Jánossy 1974
    - Perdix (Early Pleistocene – Recent)
      - †P. inferna (Kurochkin 1985) [Lophura inferna Kuročkin 1985]
      - †P. margaritae Kuročkin 1985
      - †P. palaeoperdix Mourer-Chauviré 1975
    - Syrmaticus
      - †S. kozlovae Kuročkin 1985
    - Bonasa (Early/Middle Pleistocene – Recent)
      - †B. dalianensis (Hou 1990) [Tetrastes dalianensis Hou 1990]
      - †B. nini Sánchez Marco 2009
      - †B. praebonasia (Jánossy 1974) Bocheński 1991 [Tetrastes praebonasia Jánossy 1974]
    - Dendragapus (Late Pleistocene – Recent)
      - †D. gilli (Brodkorb 1964) [Palaeotetrix gilli Brodkorb 1964]
      - †D. lucasi Jehl 1969
    - Alectoris
      - †A. baryosefi Tchernov 1980
      - †A. bavarica Ballmann 1969
      - †A. peii Hou 1982

=== Charadriiformes ===
Gulls, auks, shorebirds

- Basal and unresolved taxa
  - Charadriiformes gen. et sp. indet. (Late Cretaceous) – burhinid? basal?
  - "Morsoravis" (Late Paleocene/Early Eocene) – a nomen nudum?
  - Jiliniornis (middle Eocene) – charadriid?
  - Boutersema (Early Oligocene) – glareolid?
  - Turnipax (Early Oligocene) – turnicid?
  - Elorius (Early Miocene)
  - "Larus desnoyersii (Early Miocene of SE France) – larid? stercorarid?
  - "Larus pristinus (John Day Early Miocene of Willow Creek, US) – larid?
  - Charadriiformes gen. et spp. indet. (Early/Middle Miocene) – several species, 1 probably larid
  - Charadriiformes gen. et sp. indet. (Middle Miocene)
  - "Totanus" teruelensis (Late Miocene of Los Mansuetos, Spain) – scolopacid? larid?
  - "Actitis" balcanica (Late Pliocene of Varshets, Bulgaria) – scolopacid? charadriid?
- Scolopacidae – waders and snipes
  - Paractitis (Early Oligocene)
  - Mirolia (Middle Miocene)
  - Placement unresolved
    - Scolopacidae gen. et sp. indet. (Middle – Late Miocene)
    - Scolopacidae gen. et sp. indet. (Early Pliocene)
  - Extant genera present in the fossil record
    - Limosa (Late Eocene? – Recent)
    - Tringa (Late Eocene/Early Oligocene? – Recent) – includes Totanus
    - Gallinago (Late Miocene/Early Pliocene – Recent)
    - Scolopax (Early/Middle Pliocene? – Recent)
    - Phalaropus (Middle Pliocene – Recent)
    - Actitis (Late Pliocene – Recent)
    - Numenius (Late Pleistocene – Recent) – includes Palnumenius
- Jacanidae – jacanas
  - Nupharanassa (Early Oligocene)
  - Janipes
  - Prehistoric species of extant genera
    - Jacana farrandi
- Laridae – gulls
  - Laridae gen. et sp. indet. (Early Oligocene)
  - Laricola (Late Oligocene/Early Miocene) – larid? Formerly "Larus" elegans and "L." totanoides
  - Gaviota Miller & Sibley 1941 non Fischer 1983 (Middle/Late Miocene)
  - Extant genera present in the fossil record
    - Larus (Middle Miocene – Recent)
- Alcidae – auks
  - Hydrotherikornis (Late Eocene)
  - Pseudocepphus (Middle – Late Miocene)
  - Petralca (Early –? Late Oligocene)
  - Miocepphus (Middle Miocene)
  - Alcodes (Late Miocene)
  - Praemancalla (Late Miocene – Early Pliocene)
  - Mancalla (Late Miocene – Early Pleistocene)
  - Extant genera present in the fossil record
    - Cepphus (Late Miocene – Recent)
    - Cerorhinca (Late Miocene – Recent)
    - Uria (Late Miocene – Recent)
    - Aethia (Late Miocene – Recent)
    - Alca (Late Miocene/Early Pliocene – Recent)
    - Synthliboramphus (Late Miocene/Early Pliocene – Recent)
    - Fratercula (Early Pliocene – Recent)
    - Pinguinus (Early Pliocene – Recent)
    - Brachyramphus (Late Pliocene – Recent)
    - Ptychoramphus (Late Pliocene – Recent)
- Stercorariidae – skuas and jaegers
  - Prehistoric species of extant genera
    - Stercorarius sp. (Middle Miocene)
    - Stercorarius shufeldti (Fossil Lake Middle Pleistocene of WC US)
    - Prehistoric subspecies of extant species
      - Stercorarius pomarinus philippi
- Glareolidae – pratincoles
  - Paractiornis (Agate Fossil Beds Early Miocene of Sioux County, US)
  - Mioglareola (Early Miocene of Czech Republic) - formerly "Larus" dolnicensis
  - Prehistoric species of extant genera
    - Glareola neogena
- Burhinidae – thick-knees
  - Prehistoric species of extant genera
    - Burhinus lucorum (Early Miocene)
    - Burhinus aquilonaris
    - Burhinus sp. (Cuba, West Indies)
    - Burhinus sp. (Late Pleistocene of Las Higueruelas, Spain)
    - Prehistoric subspecies of extant species
      - Burhinus bistriatus nanus (Bahamas, West Indies)
- Charadriidae – plovers
  - Limicolavis (John Day Early Miocene of Malheur County, US)
  - Viator (Late Pleistocene of Talara, Peru) – may be synonym of Vanellus (or Belanopteryx if valid)
  - Extant genera present in the fossil record
    - Vanellus (Middle/Late Pleistocene – Recent) – includes Belanopteryx
  - Additional prehistoric species of extant genera
    - Oreopholus orcesi
- Recurvirostridae – avocets
  - Extant genera present in the fossil record
    - Himantopus (Late Miocene – Recent)
  - Additional prehistoric species of extant genera
    - Recurvirostra sanctaeneboulae

=== †Gastornithiformes (extinct) ===
The diatrymas, a group of huge flightless Paleogene birds of unclear affinities. Traditionally placed within the Gruiformes, they are usually considered a distinct order nowadays and appear closer to the Anseriformes.

- Gastornithidae
  - †Ornitholithes biroi Dughi & Sirugue 1969 [ootaxa- Gastornis?]
  - †Ornithoformipes controversus [ichnotaxa]
  - †Rivavipes giantess [ichnotaxa]
  - †Gasthornithidae gen. et sp. indet. (Paleocene) – possibly Gastornis
  - †Gasthornithidae gen. et sp. indet. YPM PU 13258 (Early Eocene) – possibly juvenile Gastornis giganteus
  - †"Diatryma" cotei Galliard 1936 (middle-Late Eocene)
  - †Gastornis Hébert 1855 [Diatryma Cope 1876; Barornis Marsh 1894; Omorhamphus Sinclair 1928; Palaeornis Bonaparte 1856; Macrornis Seeley 1866; Zhongyuanus Hou 1980] (Late Paleocene – middle Eocene)
    - †G. parisiensis Hébert 1855 [Gastornis edwardsii Lemoine 1878; Gastornis klaasseni Newton 1885]
    - †G. giganteus (Cope 1876) [Diatryma gigantea Cope 1876; Barornis regens Marsh 1894; Diatryma regens (Marsh 1894); Omorhamphus storchii Sinclair 1928 (juvenile); Diatryma steini Matthew & Granger 1917; Diatryma ajax Shufeldt 1913; Gastornis ajax (Shufeldt 1913) Brodkorb 1967]
    - †G. sarasini (Schaub 1929) Mlíkovský 2002 [Diatryma sarasini Schaub, 1929b; Diatryma geiselensis Fischer 1978; Gastornis geiselensis (Fischer 1978)]
    - †G. russeli Martin 1992
    - †G. xichuanensis (Hou 1980) Buffetaut 2013 [Zhongyuanus xichuanensis Hou 1980]

=== Gruiformes ===
The group that includes modern rails and cranes. Probably paraphyletic.

- Placement unresolved
  - †Rupelrallus Fischer 1997 (Early Oligocene)– rallid? parvigruid?
    - †R. belgicus Mayr 2012
    - †R. saxoniensis Fischer 1997
  - †"Gruiformes" gen. et sp. indet. MNZ S42623 (Early/Middle Miocene)– Aptornithidae?
- †Songziidae Hou 1990 possibly a nomen nudum
  - †Songzia Hou 1990(Eocene) possibly a nomen nudum
    - †S. heidangkouensis Hou 1990
    - †S. acutunguis Wang et al. 2012
- †Eogruidae Wetmore 1934
  - †Sonogrus gregalis Kuročkin 1981 (Ergilin Dzo Late Eocene/Early Oligocene of Khor Dzan, Mongolia)
  - †Eogrus Wetmore 1932 [Progrus Bendukidze 1971] (Irdin Manha Middle/Late Eocene – Tung Gur Late Miocene/Early Pliocene of Mongolia)
    - †E. aeola Wetmore 1932
    - †E. crudus Kuročkin 1981
    - †E. turanicus (Bendukidze 1971) [Progrus turanicus Bendukidze 1971]
    - †E. wetmorei Brodkorb 1967
  - †Ergilornithinae
  - †Proergilornis minor Kozlova 1960 (Early/middle Oligocene of Ergil-Obo, Mongolia)
  - †Ergilornis Kozlova 1960(Early/middle Oligocene of Ergil-Obo, Mongolia)
    - †E. rapidus
    - †E. minor
  - †Amphipelargus Lydekker 1891 [Urmiornis Harrison 1981]
    - †A. brodkorbi (Karkhu 1997) [Urmiornis brodkorbi Karkhu 1997]
    - †A. majori Lydekker 1891 [Amphipelargus maraghanus (Mecquenem 1925) Kuročkin 1985; Urmiornis maraghanus Mecquenem 1925] [treated as ciconiid by Louchart et al. 2005]
    - †A. dzabghanensis Kuročkin 1985
    - †A. cracrafti (Harrison & Walker 1982) Kuročkin 1985 [Urmiornis cracrafti Harrison & Walker 1982]
    - †A. ukrainus (Kuročkin 1981) Kuročkin 1985 [Urmiornis ukrainus Kuročkin 1981]
    - †A. orientalis (Kuročkin 1981) Kuročkin 1985 [Urmiornis orientalis Kuročkin 1981]
- †Geranoididae Wetmore 1933
  - †Eogeranoides campivagus Cracraft 1969 (Willwood Early Eocene of Foster Gulch, US)
  - †Geranoides jepseni Wetmore 1933 (Willwood Early Eocene of South Elk Creek, US)
  - †Geranodornis aenigma Cracraft 1969 (Bridger middle Eocene of Church Buttes, US)
  - †Galligeranoides boriensis Bourdon, Mourer-Chauviré & Laurent 2014
  - †Palaeophasianus Shufeldt 1913 (Willwood Early Eocene of Bighorn County, US)
    - †P. meleagroides Shufeldt 1913
    - †P. incompletus Cracraft 1969
  - †Paragrus Lambrecht 1933 (Early Eocene of WC US)
    - †P. prentici (Loomis 1906) Lambrecht 1933 [Gallinuloides prentici Loomis 1906; Grus prentici (Loomis 1906)]
    - †P. shufeldti Cracraft 1969
- †Parvigruidae Mayr 2005
  - †Parvigrus pohli Mayr 2005 (Early Oligocene of Pichovet, France)
- Aramidae Bonaparte 1854
  - †Badistornis aramus Wetmore 1940 (middle Oligocene)– aramid?
  - Extant genera present in the fossil record
    - Aramus paludigrus Rasmussen 1997 (Middle Miocene of La Venta, Colombia)- Aramid
- Gruidae – cranes
  - †Camusia quintanai Seguí 2002 (Late Miocene of Menorca, Mediterranean)
  - †Aramornis Wetmore 1926 (Middle Miocene) – gruid? aramid?
    - †A. longurio Wetmore 1926
    - †A. robalearica
    - †A. crataegensis
  - †Palaeogrus Portis 1885 (middle Eocene of Germany and Italy – Middle Miocene of France)
    - †P. princeps Portis 1884 [Ornitocnemus robustus (sic) Zigno 1875 nomen nudum; Grus princeps (Portis 1885) Lydekker 1891a]
    - †P. hordwelliensis (Lydekker 1891) Lambrecht 1933 [Grus hordwellianus Lydekker 1891; Ornitocnemus hordwelliensis (Lydekker) Brodkorb 1967]
    - †P. mainburgensis Göhlich 2003
  - †Geranopsis hastingsiae Lydekker 1871 Hordwell Late Eocene– Early Oligocene of England)– gruiform (gruid?) or anseriform (anseranatid?)?
  - †Eobalearica tugarinovi Gureev 1949 (Ferghana Late? Eocene of Ferghana, Uzbekistan)
  - †Pliogrus (Early Pliocene of Eppelsheim, Germany)
  - †Probalearica mongolica Kurochkin 1985 (Late Oligocene? – Middle Pliocene) gruid? A nomen dubium?
  - Gruidae gen. et sp. indet. – formerly Grus conferta Miller & Sibley 1942 (Late Miocene/Early Pliocene of Contra Costa County, US)
  - Extant genera present in the fossil record
    - Balearica (Early Miocene – Recent)
      - †B. crataegensis (Brodkorb 1963) [Probalearica crataegensis Brodkorb 1963]
      - †B. excelsa (Milne-Edwards 1871) Mlíkovský 2002 [Palaeogrus excelsa (Milne-Edwards 1871) Lambrecht 1933; Grus excelsa Milne-Edwards 1871; Ornitocnemus excelsus (Milne-Edwards 1871) Brodkorb 1967]
      - †B. exigua Feduccia & Voorhies 1992
      - †B. rummeli (Mlíkovský 1998) Mourer-Chauviré 2001 [Basityto rummeli Mlíkovský 1998] (giant barn-owl)
    - Grus (Middle/Late Miocene – Recent)
      - †G. bogatshevi
      - †G. haydeni Marsh 1870
      - †G. latipes [Baeopteryx latipes]
      - †G. moldavica (Kuročkin & Ganya 1972) Mlíkovský 2002 [Probalearica moldavica Kuročkin & Ganya 1972]
      - †G. nannodes Wetmore & Martin 1930
      - †G. pagei Campbell 1995
      - †G. pentelici Gaudry 1862 [Pliogrus pentelici (Gaudry 1862) Lambrecht 1933; G. afghana Mourer-Chauviré et al. 1985]
      - †G. primigenia Milne-Edwards 1869
      - †G. melitensis Lydekker 1890 (Maltese crane)
- Rallidae – rails
  - †Aletornis Marsh 1872 [Protogrus Lambrecht 1933] (middle Eocene)
    - †A. marshi (Shufeldt 1915) Lambrecht 1933 [Grus marshi Shufeldt 1915; Protogrus marshi (Shufeldt 1915)]
    - †A. bellus Marsh 1872
    - †A. gracilis Marsh 1872
    - †A. nobilis Marsh 1872 [Grus nobilis (Marsh 1872) Shufeldt; Protogrus nobilis (Marsh 1872) Lambrecht 1933]
    - †A. pernix Marsh 1872
  - †Australlus Worthy & Boles 2011
    - †A. disneyi (Boles 2005) Worthy & Boles 2011 [Gallinula disneyi Boles 2005]
    - †A. gagensis Worthy & Boles 2011
  - †Baselrallus intermedius De Pietri & Mayr 2014
  - †Belgirallus Mayr & Smith 2001 (Early Oligocene)
    - †B. minutus Mayr & Smith 2001
    - †B. oligocaenus Mayr & Smith 2001
  - †Creccoides osbornii Shufeldt 1892 (Late Pliocene/Early Pleistocene)
  - †Eocrex Wetmore 1931 (Early Eocene)
    - †E. primus Wetmore 1931
    - †E. tagusevae Panteleyev 2001
  - †Euryonotus Mercerat 1897 (Pleistocene)– rallid?
    - †E. uspallatensis Mercerat 1897
    - †E. brachypterus Mercerat 1897
    - †E. argentinus Mercerat 1897
  - †Fulicaletornis venustus (Marsh 1872) Lambrecht 1933 [Aletornis venustus Marsh 1872] (middle Eocene)
  - †Ibidopsis hordwelliensis Lydekker 1891 (Late Eocene)
  - †Latipons Harrison & Walker 1979 (middle Eocene)
    - †L. gardneri Harrison & Walker 1979
    - †L. robinsoni Harrison & Walker 1979
  - †Miofulica dejardini (Van Beneden 1871) Lambrecht 1933 [Fulica dejardinii Van Beneden 1871] (Middle Miocene)
  - †Miorallus major (Milne-Edwards 1869) Lambrecht 1933 [Rallus major Milne-Edwards 1869] (Middle – Late Miocene)
  - †Palaeoaramides Lambrecht 1933 [Pararallus Lambrecht 1933; Tertiariaporphyrula Kuročkin & Ganya 1972] (Late Oligocene/Early Miocene – Late Miocene)
    - †P. lungi (Kuročkin & Ganya 1972) Olson 1977 [Tertiariaporphyrula lungi Kuročkin & Ganya 1972; Mioporphyrula lungi (Kurochkin &Ganya 1972)]
    - †P. minutus Cracraft 1973
    - †P. tugarinovi Kuročkin 1980 [Tertiariaporphyrula tugarinovi (Kurochkin, 1980)]
    - †P. christyi (Milne-Edwards 1869) Lambrecht 1933 [Rallus christyi Milne-Edwards 1869; Rallus eximius Milne-Edwards 1869; Palaeoaramides eximius (Milne-Edwards 1869) Brodkorb 1967]
    - †P. minor [Rallus minor]
    - †P. beaumontii (Milne-Edwards 1869) Cracraft 1973 [Rallus beaumontii Milne-Edwards 1869; Pararallus beaumontii (Milne-Edwards 1869) Brodkorb 1967); Tertiariaporphyrula beaumonti (Milne-Edwards) Kuročkin & Ganea 1972; Rallus dispar Milne-Edwards 1869; Pararallus dispar (Milne-Edwards 1869) Lambrecht 1933; Palaeoaramides dispar (Milne-Edwards 1869)]
  - †Palaeorallus Wetmore 1931 (Early Eocene)
    - †P. troxelli Wetmore 1931
    - †P. brodkorbi Cracraft 1973
  - †Paraortygometra porzanoides (Milne-Edwards 1871) Lambrecht 1933 [Microrallus Švec 1983; Rallus porzanoides Milne-Edwards 1871; Microrallus fejfari Švec 1983] (Late Oligocene/?Early Miocene –? Middle Miocene)
  - †Parvirallus Harrison & Walker 1979 (Early – middle Eocene)
    - †P. gracilis Harrison & Walker 1979
    - †P. bassetti Harrison 1984
    - †P. gassoni Harrison 1984
    - †P. medius Harrison 1984
  - †Pastushkinia zazhigini (Kuročkin 1980) Zelenkov 2013 [Crex zazhigini Kuročkin 1980]
  - †Pleistorallus flemingi Worthy 1997 (Fleming's rails)
  - †Quercyrallus (Late Eocene –? Late Oligocene)
    - †Q. ludianus Brodkorb 1963 [Quercyrallus intermedius Milne-Edwards 1868; Rallus adelus Oberholser 1917; Ludiortyx adelus (Oberholser 1917)]
    - †Q. arenarius (Milne-Edwards 1891) Lambrecht 1933 [Rallus arenarius Milne-Edwards 1891]
    - †Q. quercy Cracraft 1973
  - †Rallicrex (Middle/Late Oligocene)
    - †R. litkensis Kessler & Hir 2012
    - †R. polgardiensis Jánossy 1991
    - †R. kolozsvarensis Lambrecht 1933
  - †Rhenanorallus rhenanus Mayr 2010
  - †Wanshuina lii Hou 1994
  - †Youngornis (Middle Miocene)
    - †Y. gracilis Yeh 1981
    - †Y. qiluensis Yeh & Bo 1989
  - Placement unresolved
    - Rallidae gen. et sp. indet. (Late Oligocene)
    - Rallidae gen. et spp. indet. (Early/Middle Miocene)– several species
    - Rallidae gen. et sp. indet. (Middle Miocene)
    - Rallidae gen. et sp. indet. (Late Miocene)
    - Rallidae gen. et sp. indet. UMMP V55013/-14; UMMP V55012/V45750/V45746 (Late Pliocene)
    - Rallidae gen. et sp. indet. UMMP V29080 (Late Pliocene)
    - Rallidae gen. et sp. indet. (Bermuda, West Atlantic)
  - Extant genera present in the fossil record
    - Rallus [†Epirallus Miller 1942] (Middle Miocene – Recent)
      - †R. auffenbergi (Brodkorb 1954) [Porzana auffenbergi Brodkorb 1954]
      - †R. cyanocavi Steadman & Wright 2013
      - †R. ibycus Olson & Wingate 2000
      - †R. lacustris Brodkorb
      - †R. minutus Alcover et al. 2015 non Pallas 1776 non Gmelin 1789 non Forster 1844
      - †R. natator (Miller 1942) [Epirallus natator Miller 1942]
      - †R. phillipsi Wetmore
      - †R. prenticei Wetmore 1944
      - †R. recessus Olson & Wingate 2001
      - †R. richmondi Olson 1977 [Rallus dubius Portis 1887 non Piller & Mitterpacher 1783]
    - Porzana (Middle? Miocene – Recent)
      - †P. botunensis Boev 2015
      - †P. estramosi Jánossy 1979
      - †P. kretzoii Kessler 2009
      - †P. matraensis Kessler 2009
      - †P. piercei Olson & Wingate 2000
      - †P. risillus Kuročkin 1980 [Rallus risillus (Kuročkin 1980) Kuročkin 1985]
    - Gallinula (Late Oligocene – Recent)
      - †G. balcanica Boev 1999
      - †G. brodkorbi McCoy 1963
      - †G. gigantea Černov 1980
      - †G. kansarum Brodkorb 1967 [Fulica americana (in partim)]
    - Fulica (Early Pliocene – Recent)
      - †F. infelix Brodkorb 1961
      - †F. podagrica Brodkorb 1965 (nomen dubium)
      - †F. stekelesi Tchernov 1968
    - Laterallus
      - †L. guti Brodkorb 1952
      - †L. insignis Feduccia 1968 (Rexroad Late Pliocene of Rexroad, US)
      - †L. sp. (Late Pliocene of Macasphalt Shell Pit, US)
    - Coturnicops
      - †C. avita Feduccia 1968 (Glenns Ferry Late Pliocene of Hagerman, US)
    - Porphyrio
      - †P. parvus Harrison & Walker 1982

=== Eurypygiformes ===
- †Aptornithidae Bonaparte 1856
  - †Aptornis proasciarostratus Worthy, Tennyson & Scofield 2011
- Eurypygidae Selby 1840
  - †Eoeurypyga olsoni Weidig 2003 nomen nudum
- †Messelornithidae Hesse 1988 – Messel-birds
  - †Pellornis mikkelseni Bertelli, Chiappe & Mayr 2011
  - †Itardiornis hessae Mourer-Chauviré 1995
  - †Messelornis Hesse 1988
    - †M. russelli Mourer-Chauviré 1995 ["Messelornis" russelli sensu Mayr 2007]
    - †M. nearctica Hesse 1992
    - †M. cristata Hesse 1988

=== Cariamiformes ===
- †Itaboravis elaphrocnemoides Mayr, Alvarenga & Clarke 2011
- †Walbeckornis creber Mayr 2007
- †Qianshanornithidae Mayr et al. 2013
  - †Qianshanornis rapax Mayr et al. 2013
- †Salmilidae Mayr 2002
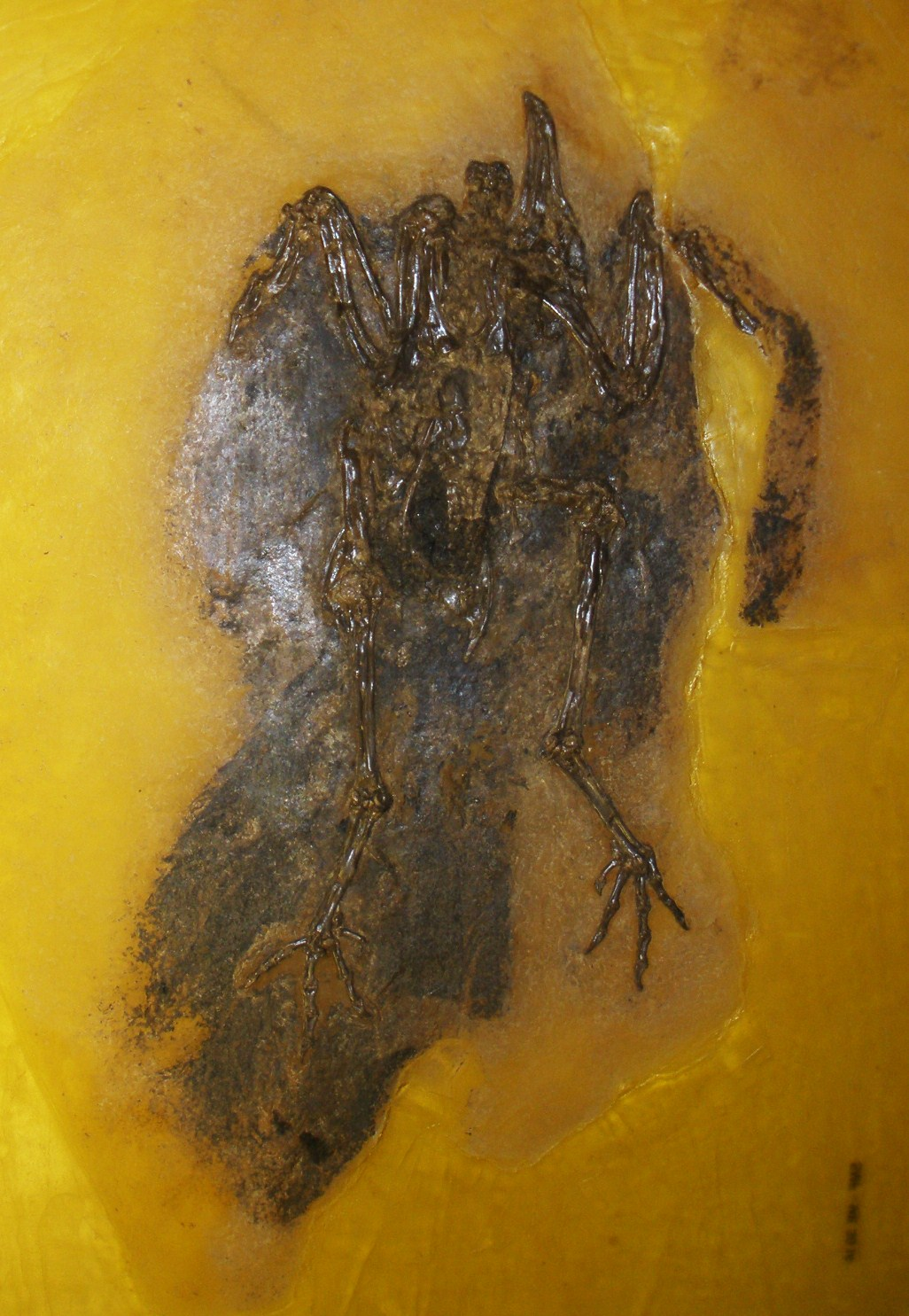
  Salmila
  - †Salmila robusta Mayr 2000
- †Ameghinornithidae Mourer-Chauviré 1981
  - †Strigogyps Gaillard 1908 [Aenigmavis Peters 1987; Ameghinornis Mourer-Chauviré 1981; Eocathartes Lambrecht 1935 non Wetmore 1944; Geiseloceros Lambrecht 1935]
    - †S. dubius Gaillard 1908
    - †S. robustus (Lambrecht 1935) [Eocathartes robustus Lambrecht 1935; Geiseloceros robustus Lambrecht 1935] (middle Eocene of Germany)
    - †S. sapea (Peters 1987) [Aenigmavis sapea Peters 1987; Ameghinornis minor Mourer-Chauviré 1981]
- †Bathornithidae Wetmore 1933
  - †Eutreptornis uintae Cracraft 1971 (Uinta Late Eocene of Ouray Agency, US)
  - †Neocathartes grallator (Wetmore 1944) Wetmore 1950 [Eocathartes Wetmore 1944 non Lambrecht 1935; Eocathartes grallator Wetmore 1944; Bathornis grallator (Wetmore 1944) Olson 1985] (Late Eocene)
  - †Paracrax Brodkorb 1964 (Early/middle Oligocene of Gerry's Ranch, US – Brule Late Oligocene of South Dakota, US)
    - †P. antiqua (Marsh 1871) Cracraft 1971 [Meleagris antiquus Marsh 1871; Oligocorax mediterraneus (Shufeldt 1915); Phalacrocorax mediterraneus Shufeldt 1915]
    - †P. wetmorei Cracraft 1968
    - †P. gigantea Cracraft 1968
  - †Bathornithidae gen. nov. (Early – middle Oligocene of C US) – formerly Bathornis celeripes Wetmore 1933 and B. cursor Wetmore 1933
  - †Bathornis Wetmore 1927 (Early Oligocene – Early Miocene of C US)
    - †B. minor Cracraft 1971
    - †B. veredus Wetmore 1927 [Palaeogyps prodromus Wetmore 1927] (Early Oligocene of WC North America)
    - †B. fax (Wetmore 1927) Cracraft 1968 [Palaeocrex fax Wetmore 1927]
    - †B. geographicus Wetmore 1942
    - †B. fricki Cracraft 1968

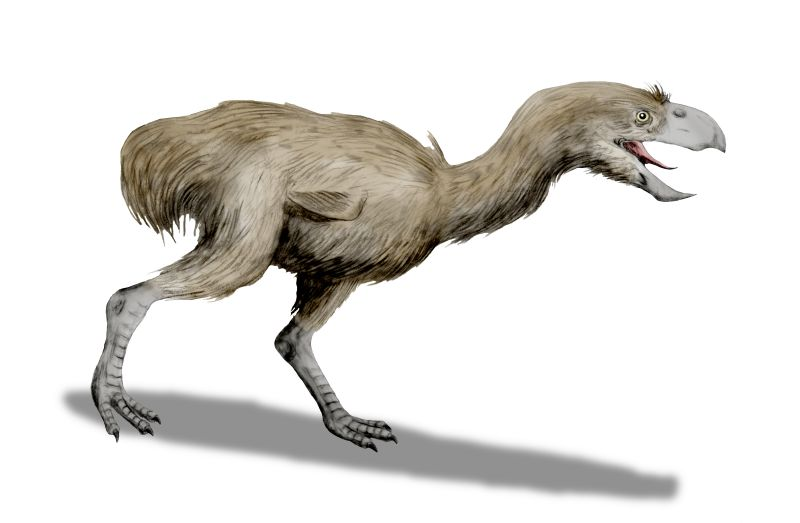
Paraphysornis

- †Idiornithidae Brodkorb 1965 [Orthocnemidae]
  - †Dynamopterus Milne-Edwards 1892 [Idiornis Oberholser 1899; Orthocnemus Milne-Edwards 1892 non Jekel 1854] (middle Eocene of Messel, Germany –? Quercy Phosphorites middle Oligocene of Quercy, France)
    - †I. cursor (Milne-Edwards 1892) Oberholser 1899 [Orthocnemus cursor Milne-Edwards 1892; Orthocnemus major Milne-Edwards 1892; Idiornis major (Milne-Edwards 1892) Oberholser 1899]
    - †I. gallicus (Milne-Edwards 1892) Oberholser 1899 [Filholornis gravis Milne-Edwards 1892; Orthocnemus gallicus Milne-Edwards 1892; Agnopterus gallicus (Milne-Edwards 1892) Mlíkovský 2002]
    - †I. gracilis (Milne-Edwards 1892) Mourer-Chauviré 1983 [Elaphrocnemus gracilis Milne-Edwards 1892; Agnopterus gracilis (Milne-Edwards 1892) Mlíkovský 2002]
    - †I. minor (Milne-Edwards 1892) Oberholser 1899 [Orthocnemus minor Milne-Edwards 1892; Agnopterus minor (Milne-Edwards 1892) Mlíkovský 2002]
    - †D. anthracinus (Mayr 2002) Mourer-Chauviré 2013 [Idiornis anthracinus Mayr 2002]
    - †D. tuberculata (Peters 1995) Mourer-Chauviré 2013 [Idiornis tuberculata Peters 1995]
    - †D. gaillardi (Cracraft 1973) Mourer-Chauviré 2013 [Idiornis gaillardi Cracraft 1973]
    - †D. itardiensis (Mourer-Chauviré 1983) Mourer-Chauviré 2013 [Idiornis itardiensis Mourer-Chauviré 1983; Agnopterus itardiensis (Mourer-Chauviré 1983) Mlíkovský 2002]
  - †Talantatos Reichenbach 1852 [Elaphrocnemus Milne-Edwards 1892; Filholornis Milne-Edwards 1892] (Late Eocene/Early Oligocene of France)
    - †T. bordkorbi (Mourer-Chauviré 1983) Mlíkovský 2002 [Elaphrocnemus bordkorbi Mourer-Chauviré 1983]
    - †T. crex (Milne-Edwards 1892) [Elaphrocnemus crex Milne-Edwards 1892]
    - †T. phasianus (Milne-Edwards 1892) [Elaphrocnemus phasianus Milne-Edwards 1892; Filholornis debilis Milne-Edwards 1892; Filholornis paradoxa Milne-Edwards 1892]
    - †T. fossilis (Giebel 1847) Reichenbach 1852 [Tantalus fossilis Giebel 1847; Orthocnemus major Milne-Edwards 1892; Idiornis major (Milne-Edwards 1892) Oberholser 1899; Telecrex peregrinus Mlíkovský 1989b]
    - †T. proudlocki (Harrison & Walker 1979) Mlíkovský 2002 [Percolinus proudlocki Harrison & Walker 1979]
  - †Gypsornis Milne-Edwards 1869 [Percolinus Harrison & Walker 1977] (Montmartre Late Eocene of Montmartre, France)
    - †G. cuvieri Milne-Edwards 1869
    - †G. venablesi (Harrison & Walker 1977) Mlíkovský 2002 [Percolinus venablesi Harrison & Walker 1977]
  - †Propelargus Lydekker 1891 [Oblitavis Mourer-Chauviré 1983] (Late Eocene/Early Oligocene)
    - †P. edwardsi
    - †P. insolitus (Mourer-Chauviré 1983) Mlíkovský 2002 [Oblitavis insolitus Mourer-Chauviré 1983]
    - †P. cayluxensis Lydekker 1891
  - †Occitaniavis elatus (Milne-Edwards 1892) Mourer-Chauvire 1983 [Geranopsis Milne-Edwards 1892 non Lydekker 1891a; Geranopsis elatus Milne-Edwards 1892; Propelargus elatus (Milne-Edwards 1892) Mlíkovský 2002]
  - †Ibidopodia Milne-Edwards 1868 (Late Oligocene/Early Miocene of France) – threskiornithid?
    - †I. chavrochensis De Pietri & Mayr 2014
    - †I. minuta De Pietri & Mayr 2014
    - †I. palustris Milne-Edwards 1868
- †Phorusrhacidae Ameghino 1899 – Terror birds
  - †Lavocatavis africana Mourer-Chauviré et al. 2011
  - †Patagorhacos terrificus Agnolin & Chafrat 2015
  - †Eleutherornis Schaub 1940 (Late Eocene)
    - †E. helveticus Schaub 1940
    - †E. cotei Gaillard 1936
  - †Paleopsilopterus itaboraiensis Alvarenga 1985 (Middle Paleocene)
  - †Procariama simplex Rovereto 1914 (Late Miocene – Early Pliocene)
  - †Psilopterus Moreno & Mercerat 1891 [Pelecyornis Ameghino 1891; Staphylornis Mercerat 1897] (middle Oligocene – Late Miocene)
    - †P. bachmanni (Moreno & Mercerat 1891) [Patagornis bachmanni Moreno & Mercerat 1891; Psilopterus communis Moreno & Mercerat 1891; Psilopterus intermedius Moreno & Mercerat 1891; Phororhacos delicatus Ameghino 1891; Pelecyornis puerredonensis Sinclair & Farr 1932]
    - †P. lemoinei (Moreno & Mercerat 1891) [Patagornis lemoinei Moreno & Mercerat 1891; Psilopterus australis Moreno & Mercerat 1891; Pelecyornis tubulatus Ameghino 1895; Phorohacos modicus Ameghino 1895; Staphylornis gallardoi Mercerat 1897; Staphylornis erythacus Mercerat 1897; Pelecyornis tenuirostris Sinclair & Farr 1932]
    - †P. affinis (Ameghino 1899) [Phororhacos affinis Ameghino 1899]
    - †P. colzecus Tonni & Tambussi 1988
  - †Llallawavis scagliai Degrange et al. 2015
  - †Mesembriornis Moreno 1889 [Paleociconia Moreno 1889; Prophorohacos Rovereto 1914; Hermosiornis Rovereto 1914] (Late Miocene – Late Pliocene)
    - †M. milneedwardsi Moreno 1889 [Paleociconia australis Moreno 1889; Driornis pampeanus Moreno & Mercerat 1891; Hermosiornis milneedwardsi Rovereto 1914; Hermosiornis rapax Kraglievich 1946; Prophororhacos australis Brodkorb 1967]
    - †M. incertus (Rovereto 1914) [Prophororhacos incertus Rovereto 1914]
  - †Patagornis marshi Moreno & Mercerat 1891 [Morenomercatia Lambrecht 1933; Tolmodus Ameghino 1891; Tolmodus inflatus Ameghino 1891; Phorusrhacos inflatus Ameghino 1891; Paleociconia cristata (Lambrecht 1933) Brodkorb 1967; Morenomerceraria cristata Lambrecht 1933] (Early – Middle Miocene)
  - †Andrewsornis abbotti Paterson 1941 (middle – Late Oligocene)
  - †Andalgalornis steulleti (Kraglievich 1931) Patterson & Kraglievich 1960 [Phororhacos steulleti Kraglijevič 1931; Phororhacos deautieri Kraglijevič 1931; Andalgalornis ferox Patterson & Kraglijevič 1960] (Late Miocene – Early Pliocene)
  - †Phorusrhacos longissimus Ameghino 1887 [Stereornis Moreno & Mercerat 1891; Darwinornis Moreno & Mercerat 1891; Owenornis Moreno & Mercerat 1891; Titanornis Mercerat 1893; Callornis Ameghino 1895 non Calornis Dalman 1820; Eucallornis Ameghino 1901; Liornis Ameghino 1895; Phororhacos longissimus Ameghino 1889; Phororhacos platygnathus Ameghino 1891; Phororhacos sehuensis Ameghino 1891; Stereornis rollieri Moreno & Mercerat 1891; Stereornis gaundryi Moreno & Mercerat 1891; Mesembriornis studeri Moreno & Mercerat 1891; Mesembriornis quatrefragesi Moreno & Mercerat 1891; Darwinornis copei Moreno & Mercerat 1891; Darwinornis zittelli Moreno & Mercerat 1891; Darwinornis socialis Moreno & Mercerat 1891; Owenornis affinis Moreno & Mercerat 1891; Owenornis lydekkeri Moreno & Mercerat 1891; Titanornis mirabilis Mercerat 1893; Callornis giganteus Ameghino 1895; Eucallornis giganteus Ameghino 1901; Liornis floweri Ameghino 1895; Liornis minor Dolgopol de Saez 1927] (Early – Middle Miocene)
  - †Devincenzia pozzi (Kraglievich 1931) Kraglievich 1932 [Onactornis Cabrera 1939; Phorohacos pozzi Kraglievich 1931; Phorohacos longissimus mendocinus Kraglievich 1931; Devincenzia gallinali Kraglievich 1932; Onactornis depressus Cabrera 1939; Onactornis pozzi (Kraglievich 1931) Brodkorb 1967; Onactornis mendocinus (Kraglievich 1931) Brodkorb 1967] (Late Miocene – Early Pliocene)
  - †Titanis walleri Brodkorb 1963 (Early – Late Pliocene)
  - †Kelenken guillermoi Bertelli, Chiappe & Tambussi 2007 (Early – Late Pliocene)
  - †Physornis fortis Ameghino 1895 [Aucornis Ameghino 1898; Aucornis euryrhynchus Ameghino 1898] (middle – Late Oligocene)
  - †Paraphysornis brasiliensis (Alvarenga 1982) Alvarenga 1993 [Physornis brasiliensis Alvarenga 1982] (Late Oligocene/Early Miocene)
  - †Brontornis burmeisteri Moreno & Mercerat 1891 [Rostrornis Moreno & Mercerat 1891; Rostrornis floweri Moreno & Mercerat 1891; Brontornis platyonyx Ameghino 1895] (Early – Middle Miocene)
- Cariamidae Bonaparte 1850 – seriemas
  - †Riacama caliginea Ameghino 1899
  - †Pseudolarus guaraniticus Ameghino 1899 [Pseudogavia Sharpe 1892; Ameghinia Sharpe 1899]
  - †Smiliornis penetrans Ameghino 1899
  - †Noriegavis santacrucensis (Noriega, Vizcaino & Bargo 2009) Agnolin 2009 [Cariama santacrucensis Noriega, Vizcaino & Bargo 2009]
  - Prehistoric species of extant genera
    - Chunga
      - †C. incerta Tonni 1974

=== Otidiformes ===
- Otididae – bustards
  - †Gryzaja odessana Zubareva 1939 [Chlamydotis pliodeserti Serebrovskyj 1941; Otis gryzaja Vojinstvens'kyj 1967]
  - †Ioriotis gabunii Burchak-Abramovich & Vekua 1981
  - †Miootis compactus Umanskaya 1979
  - †Pleotis liui Hou 1982
  - Prehistoric species of extant genera
    - Chlamydotis Brodkorb 1967 [Otis affinis Lydekker 1891a]
      - †C. affinis (Lydekker)
      - †C. mesetaria Sánchez Marco 1990
    - Tetrax
      - †T. paratetrax (Bocheński & Kuročkin 1987) [Otis paratetrax Bocheński & Kuročkin 1987]
    - Otis
      - †O. bessarabicus Kessler & Gal 1996
      - †O. hellenica Boev, Lazaridis & Tsoukala 2014
      - †O. khosatzkii Bocheński & Kuročkin 1987 (Late Pliocene of Varshets, Bulgaria)

=== Phoenicopteriformes ===
- Placement unresolved
  - †Phoeniconotius eyrensis Miller 1963 [Phoenicopterus novaehollandiae Miller 1963] (Etadunna Late Oligocene/Early Miocene of Lake Pitikanta, Australia)
- †Palaelodidae Stejneger 1885 – Swimming-flamingos
  - †Adelalopus hoogbutseliensis Mayr & Smith 2002 (stout-legged flamingos) - (Borgloon Early Oligocene of Hoogbutsel, Belgium)
  - †Palaelodus Milne-Edwards 1863 [Pliogrus Lambrecht 1933] (middle Oligocene –? Middle Pleistocene)
    - †P. ambiguus Milne-Edwards 1863 [Grus problematica Milne-Edwards 1871; Probalearica problematica (Milne-Edwards 1871); Palaelodus gracilipes Milne-Edwards 1863; Palaelodus crassipes Milne-Edwards 1863; Paloelodus minutus (sic) Milne-Edwards 1868, Grus miocenicus Grigorescu & Kessler 1977]
    - †P. aotearoa Worthy et al. 2010
    - †P. germanicus (Lambrecht 1933) [Pliogrus germanicus Lambrecht 1933]
    - †P. kurochkini Zelenkov 2013
    - †P. pledgei Baird & Vickers-Rich 1998
    - †P. wilsoni Baird & Vickers-Rich 1998
  - †Megapaloelodus Miller 1944 (Late Oligocene – Early Pliocene)
    - †M. conectens (Miller 1944)
    - †M. peiranoi Agnolin 2009
    - †M. goliath (Milne Edwards 1863) Cheneval 1983c [Paloelodus goliath (sic) Milne-Edwards 1868]
    - †M. opsigonus Brodkorb 1961
- Phoenicopteridae – flamingos
  - †Harrisonavis croizeti (Gervais 1852) Kashin 1978 [Gervaisia Harrison & Walker 1976 non Bonaparte 1854 non Waga 1858 non Robineau-Desvoidy 1863; Phoenicopterus croizeti Gervais 1852; Gervaisia croizeti (Gervais 1852) Harrison & Walker 1976]
  - †Leakeyornis aethiopicus (Harrison & Walker 1976) Vickers-Rich & Walker 1983 [Phoenicopterus aethiopicus Harrison & Walker 1976]
  - †Elornis Milne-Edwards 1868 [Elornis Aymard 1856 nomen nudum; Helornis Lydekker 1891; Actiornis] (Middle? Eocene – Early Oligocene)
    - †E. anglicus Aymard 1856 nomen nudum [Helornis anglicus; Actiornis anglicus Lydekker 1891]
    - †E. grandis Milne-Edwards 1868 [Elornis grandis 1856 Aymard nomen nudum]
    - †E. littoralis Milne-Edwards 1868 [Elornis littoralis Aymard 1856 nomen nudum; Elornis antiquus Aymard 1856 nomen nudum; Elornis antiquus Milne-Edwards 1868; Helornis littoralis (Milne-Edwards 1868) Lydekker 1891]
  - Placement unresolved
    - Phoenicopteridae gen. et sp. indet. (Middle? – Late Miocene)
  - Extant genera present in the fossil record
    - Phoenicopterus (middle Oligocene – Recent)
      - †P. floridanus Brodkorb 1953
      - †P. stocki (Miller 1944)
      - †P. siamensis Cheneval et al. 1991
      - †P. gracilis Miller 1963 (Early Pleistocene of Lake Kanunka, Australia)

=== Podicipediformes ===
- Podicipedidae – grebes
  - †Miobaptus Švec 1982 (Early Miocene)
    - †M. huzhiricus Zelenkov 2015
    - †M. walteri Švec 1982 [Podiceps walteri (Švec 1984) Mlíkovský 2000]
  - †Miodytes serbicus Dimitreijevich, Gál & Kessler 2002
  - †Pliolymbus baryosteus Murray 1967 (Late Pliocene – Early? Pleistocene)
  - †Thiornis sociata Navás 1922 [Podiceps sociatus (Navás 1922) Olson] (Late Miocene –? Early Pliocene)
  - Placement unresolved
    - Podicipedidae gen. et sp. indet. (Late Pliocene) – formerly included in Podiceps parvus
    - Podicipedidae gen. et sp. indet. UMMP 49592, 52261, 51848, 52276, KUVP 4484 (Late Pliocene)
    - Podicipedidae gen. et sp. indet. (Late Pliocene/Early Pleistocene)
  - Extant genera present in the fossil record
    - Aechmophorus (Late Pliocene – Recent)
      - †A. elasson Murray 1967
    - Podilymbus (Late Pliocene – Recent)
      - †P. mujusculus Murray 1967
      - †P. wetmorei Storer 1976
      - †P. podiceps magnus
    - Podiceps (Late Oligocene/Early Miocene – Recent)
      - †P. arndti Chandler 1990
      - †P. caspicus (Habizl 1783) [Colymbus caspicus Habizl 1783]
      - †P. csarnotatus Kessler 2009
      - †P. discors Murray 1967
      - †P. dixi Brodkorp 1963
      - †P. miocenicus Kessler 1984
      - †P. oligocaenus (Shufeldt)
      - †P. parvus (Shufeldt 1913) [Colymbus parvus Schufeldt 1913]
      - †P. solidus Kuročkin 1985
      - †P. subparvus (Miller & Bowman 1958) [Colymbus subparvus Miller & Bowman 1958]

=== Phaethontiformes ===
- †Prophaethontidae Harrison & Walker 1976
  - †Lithoptila abdounensis Bourdon, Bouya & Iarochène 2005 (Late Paleocene – Early Eocene of Ouled Abdoun Basin, Morocco)– including Abdounornis
  - †Prophaethon shrubsolei Andrews 1899 (Late Paleocene ?– Early Eocene)
- Phaethontidae Brandt 1831 – tropicbirds
  - ?†Proplegadis fisheri Harrison & Walker 1971 (London Clay Early Eocene of England) – Threskiornithidae?
  - †Phaethusavis pelagicus Bourdon, Amaghzaz & Bouya 2008 (Early Eocene of Ouled Abdoun Basin, Morocco)
  - †Heliadornis Olson 1985 (Miocene of North America and Europe)
    - †H. ashbyi Olson 1985
    - †H. minor Kessler 2009
    - †H. paratethydicus Mlíkovský 1997

=== Ciconiiformes ===
The diverse group that includes storks, herons and New World vultures. Paraphyletic as listed here.

- †Ciconiidae – storks
  - †Ciconiopsis antarctica Ameghino 1899
  - †Palaeoephippiorhynchus dietrichi Lambrecht 1930 (Early Oligocene)
  - †Grallavis edwardsi (Lydekker 1891c) Cheneval 1984 [Propelargus edwardsi Lydekker 1891c; Palaeoephippiorhynchus edwardsi (Lydekker 1891)] (Early Miocene) – may be same as Prociconia
  - †Pelargosteon tothi Kretzoi 1962 (Early Pleistocene)
  - †Sanshuiornis zhangi Wang et al. 2012
  - Placement unresolved
    - Ciconiidae gen. et sp. indet. – formerly Aquilavus bilinicus (Laube 1909) Brodkorb 1964; Cygnus bilinicus Laube 1909 (Early Miocene)
    - Ciconiidae gen. et sp. indet. (Late Miocene)
    - cf. Leptoptilos gen. et sp. indet. – formerly Leptoptilos siwalicensis Harrison 1974 (Late Miocene? - Late Pliocene)
    - Ciconiidae gen. et sp. indet. (Late Pleistocene) – Ciconia or Mycteria?
  - Extant genera present in the fossil record
    - Ciconia (Early Miocene? – Recent) – includes Xenorhynchus
      - †C. lydekkeri Ameghino 1891 (Middle to Late Pleistocene)
      - †C. gaudryi Lambrecht 1933
      - †C. minor Harrison 1980
      - †C. sarmatica Grigorescu & Kessler 1977
      - †C. kahli Haarhoff 1988
      - †C. louisebolesae Boles 2005
      - †C. lucida Kuročkin 1982
      - †C. maltha Miller 1910 (Asphalt/La Brea stork)
      - †C. nana (De Vis 1888) Rich & van Tets 1982 [Xenorhynchus nanus De Vis 1888] (Australian stork)
      - †C. stehlini Janossy 1992
    - Mycteria (Middle Miocene – Recent)
      - †M. milleri (Short 1966) [Dissourodes milleri Short 1966]
      - †M. wetmorei Howard 1935
    - Ephippiorhynchus (Late Miocene – Recent)
      - †E. tchoufour Louchart et al. 2008
      - †E. pakistanensis Harrison & Walker 1982
    - Leptoptilos (Late Miocene – Recent) – includes Cryptociconia
      - †L. falconeri (Milne-Edwards 1868) Lydekker 1884 [Argala falconeri Milne-Edwards 1867]
      - †L. pliocenicus Zubareva 1948
      - †L. inidcus (Harrison 1974) [Cryptociconia indica Harrison 1974]
      - †L. lüi Zhang et al. 2012
      - †L. patagonicus Noriega & Cladera 2008
      - †L. robustus Meijer & Awe Due 2010
      - †L. richae Harrison 1974
      - †L. titan Wetmore 1940
    - Jabiru (Early Pliocene – Recent)
      - †J. codorensis Walsh & Sánchez 2008

=== Pelecaniformes ===
The group that includes modern pelicans and cormorants. As presented here paraphyletic; the tropicbird lineage is not part of this group and relationships with Procellariiformes and Sphenisciformes require more research. Also, as the pelicans are at least as close to the Ciconiiformes as to cormorants, the latter group is being recognized as Phalacrocoraciiformes by some recent authors and the core Pelecaniformes are occasionally merged into the Ciconiiformes.

- Basal and unresolved forms
  - †Piscator tenuirostris Harrison & Walker 1976 (Early-Late Eocene of England) (Auk98:199)– basal phalacrococacoid?
  - †"Prophalacrocorax ronzoni (Gervais 1849) Harrison 1975 [Sula ronzoni (Gervais 1849) Milne-Edwards 1897; Mergus ronzoni ronzoni Gervais 1849] (Early Oligocene of Ronzon, France)
  - † "Pelecaniformes" gen. et sp. indet. (Jebel Qatrani Early Oligocene of Fayum, Egypt) basal phalacrococacoid (similar to Piscator?)?
- Fregatidae – frigatebirds
  - †Limnofregata Olson 1977 (Early Eocene)
    - †L. azygosternon Olson 1977
    - †L. hutchisoni Stidham 2014
    - †L. hasegawai Olson & Matsuoka 2005
- Sulidae – gannets and boobies
  - †Bimbisula melanodactylus Benson & Erickson 2013
  - †Eostega lebedinskyi Lambrecht 1929 (Middle/Late Eocene)
  - †Empheresula arvenensis (Milne-Edwards 1867) Harrison 1975 [Sula arvernensis Milne-Edwards 1867; Parasula] (Late Oligocene – Middle Miocene)
  - †Masillastega rectirostris Mayr 2002 (middle Eocene)
  - †Microsula pygmaea (Milne-Edwards 1874) Wetmore 1938 [Sula pygmaea; Microsula pygmaea; Sula avita; Enkurosula; Pseudosula] (Late Oligocene – Middle Miocene)
  - †Miosula media Miller 1925 (Late Miocene)
  - †Palaeosula stocktoni (Miller 1935) Howard 1958 (?Early Pliocene)
  - †Rhamphastosula Stucchi & Urbina 2004 (Early Pliocene)
    - †R. ramirezi Stucchi & Urbina 2004
    - †R. aguirrei Stucchi, Varas-Malca & Urbina-Schmitt 2015
  - †Sarmatosula dobrogensis Grigorescu & Kessler 1977 (Middle Miocene)
  - Placement unresolved
    - Sulidae gen. et sp. indet. (Late Oligocene)
    - Sulidae gen. et sp. indet. (Late Pliocene)
  - Extant genera present in the fossil record
    - Morus (Early Miocene – Recent)
      - †M. avitus (Wetmore 1938) [Sula (Microsula) avita (Wetmore 1938); Microsula avitus Wetmore 1938]
      - †M. lompocanus Domning 1978 [Sula lompocana (Domning 1978)]
      - †M. loxostylus (Cope 1870) Brodkorb 1963 [Sula loxostyla Cope 1870; Morus atlanticus (Shufeldt 1915); Sula atlantica Shufeldt 1915]
      - †M. olsoni Grigorescu & Kessler 1988
      - †M. peninsularis Brodkorb 1955 [Sula peninsularis (Brodkorb 1955)]
      - †M. peruvianus Stucchi 2003 [Sula peruviana (Stucchi 2003)]
      - †M. recentior Howard 1949
      - †M. reyanus Howard 1936 (Del Rey gannet)
      - †M. vagabundus Wetmore 1930 [Sula vagabundus (Wetmore 1930)]
      - †M. willetti (Miller 1925) [Sula willetti Miller 1925]
    - Sula (Middle Pliocene – Recent)
      - †S. brandi Stucchi, Varas-Malca & Urbina-Schmitt 2015
      - †S. figueroae Stucchi, Varas-Malca & Urbina-Schmitt 2015
      - †S. clarki Chandler 1990
      - †S. humeralis Miller & Bowman 1958 [Morus humeralis Miller & Bowman 1958]
      - †S. magna (Howard 1978) Stucchi 2003 [Morus magnus Howard 1978]
      - †S. pohli Howard 1958
      - †S. sulita Stucchi 2003
      - †S. universitatis Brodkorb 1963

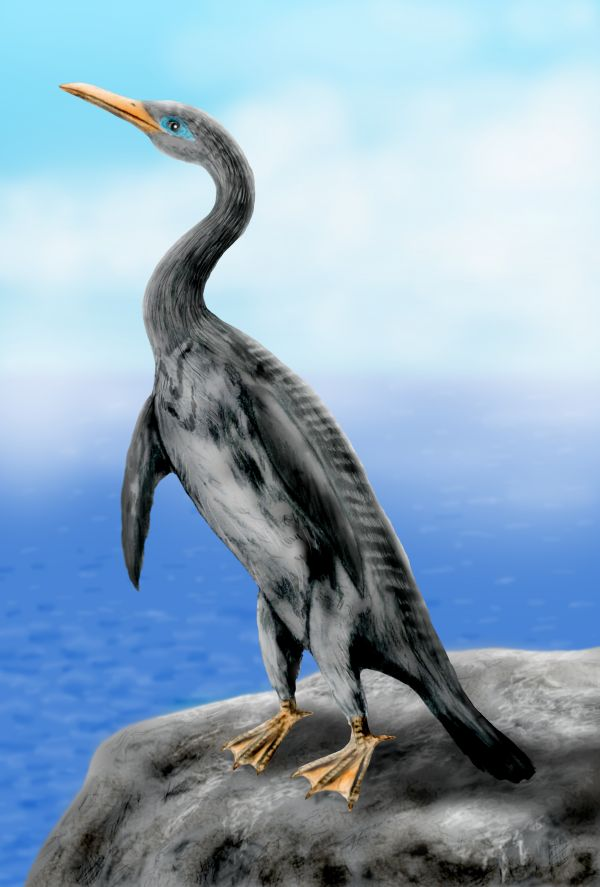
Copepteryx

- Phalacrocoracidae – cormorants and shags
  - †Borvocarbo Mourer-Chauviré, Berthet & Hugueney 2004 (Late Oligocene of C Europe) – phalacrocoracid? basal phalacrococacoid?
    - †B. guilloti Mourer-Chauviré, Berthet & Hugueney 2004
    - †B. tardatus Göhlich & Mourer-Chauviré 2010
  - †Limicorallus Kuročkin 1968 (middle Oligocene)
    - †L. saiensis Kuročkin 1968
    - †L. carbunculus Mayr 2009
  - †Nambashag Worthy 2011
    - †N. billerooensis Worthy 2011
    - †N. microglaucus Worthy 2011
  - †Nectornis Cheneval 1984 (Late Oligocene?/Early Miocene – Middle Miocene)
    - †N. africanus Mayr 2014
    - †N. miocaenus (Milne-Edwards 1868) [?Phalacrocorax miocaenus (Milne-Edwards 1868)]
    - †N. anatolicus (Mourer-Chauviré 1978) Mlíkovský 1998 [Phalacrocorax anatolicus Mourer-Chauviré 1978]
  - †Valenticarbo praetermissus Harrison 1979 (Late Pliocene/Early Pleistocene) – a nomen dubium
  - †Oligocorax Lambrecht 1933
    - †O. littoralis Milne-Edwards 1868 [Phalacrocorax littoralis (Milne-Edwards 1868)]
    - †O. stoeffelensis (Mayr 2007) Mayr 2014 [Oligocorax sp. Mayr 2001; Borvocarbo stoeffelensis Mayr 2007]
  - Placement unresolved
    - †Phalacrocoracidae gen. et sp. indet. (Late Eocene ?–? mid-Oligocene)
  - Extant genera present in the fossil record
    - Phalacrocorax (Oligocene –? Recent) – may be several genera. Includes Australocorax, Miocorax
      - †P. gregorii De Vis 1905
      - †P. gregorii (De Vis 1905) [Australocorax vetustus De Vis 1905]
      - †P. chapalensis Alvarez 1977
      - †P. destefani (Regalia 1902) [Paracorax destefani Regalia 1902]
      - †P. femoralis (Miller 1929) [Miocorax femoralis Miller 1929]
      - †P. filyawi Emslie 1995b
      - †P. goletensis Howard 1965
      - †P. ibericus Villalta 1963
      - †P. idahensis (Marsh 1870) [Graculus idahensis Marsh 1870]
      - †P. intermedius (Milne-Edwards 1867) [Phalacrocorax praecarbo, Ardea brunhuberi; Phalacrocorax brunhuberi (Milne-Edwards); Botaurites avitus]
      - †P. kennelli (Howard 1949)
      - †P. kuehneanus Schlüter 1991
      - †P. longipes (Tugarinov 1940) [Pliocarbo longipes Tugarinov 1940]
      - †P. leptopus Brodkorb 1961
      - †P. macer Brodkorb
      - †P. macropus (Cope 1878) [Graculus macropus Cope 1878]
      - †P. marinavis (Shufeldt 1915) [Oligocorax marinavis Shufeldt 1915]
      - †P. mongoliensis Kuročkin 1971
      - †P. owrei Brodkorb & Mourer-Chauviré 1984
      - †P. reliquus Kuročkin 1976
      - †P. rogersi (Howard 1932)
      - †P. serdicensis Burčak-Abramovič & Nikolov 1984
      - †P. tanzaniae Harrison & Walker 1979
      - †P. wetmorei Brodkorb 1955
- †Plotopteridae – diving-"boobies"
  - †Copepteryx Olson & Hasegawa 1996
    - †C. hexeris Olson & Hasegawa 1996
    - †C. titan Olson & Hasegawa 1996
  - †Hokkaidornis abashiriensis Sakurai, Kimura & Katoh 2008
  - †Phocavis maritimus Goedert 1988
  - †Plotopterum joaquinensis Howard 1969
  - †Tonsala Olson 1980
    - †T. hildegardae Olson 1980
    - †T. buchanani Dyke, Xia & Habib 2011
- †Protoplotidae
  - †Protoplotus beauforti Lambrecht 1931 (Paleocene? – middle Eocene of Sumatra)
- Anhingidae – darters
  - †Meganhinga chilensis Alvarenga 1995 (Early Miocene)
  - †Macranhinga Noriega 1992 (giant snake-birds) (Middle/Late Miocene –? Early Pliocene)
    - †M. paranensis Noriega 1992 [Meganhinga paranensis (Noriega 1992)]
    - †M. ranzii Alvarenga & Guilherme 2003
  - †"Paranavis" (Middle/Late Miocene) – a nomen nudum
  - †Giganhinga kiyuensis Inderknecht & Noriega 2002 (Late Pliocene/Early Pleistocene)
  - Extant genera present in the fossil record
    - Anhinga (Early Miocene – Recent)
      - †A. beckeri Emslie 1998
      - †A. hadarensis Brodkorb & Mourer-Chauviré 1982
      - †A. laticeps (De Vis 1906) [Plotus laticeps De Vis 1906]
      - †A. malagurala Mackness 1995
      - †A. pannonica Lambrecht 1916
      - †A. subvolans (Brodkorb 1956) Becker 1986 [Phalacrocorax subvolans Brodkorb 1956]
      - †A. walterbolesi Worthy 2012
      - †A. fraileyi Campbell 1996 [?Macranhinga fraileyi (Campbell 1996)]
      - †A. grandis Martin & Mengel 1975
      - †A. minuta Alvarenga & Guilherme 2003
- Pelecanidae – pelicans
  - †Protopelicanus cuvieri Reichenbach 1852
  - †Miopelecanus Cheneval 1984
    - †M. gracilis (Milne-Edwards 1863) Cheneval 1984 [Pelecanus gracilis Milne-Edwards 1863]
    - †M. intermedius (Fraas 1870) Cheneval 1984 [Pelecanus intermedius Fraas 1870]
  - Extant genera present in the fossil record
    - Pelecanus (Late Pliocene – Recent)
      - †P. aethiopicus Harrison & Walker 1976
      - †P. cautleyi Davies 1880
      - †P. fraasi Lydekker 1891
      - †P. halieus Wetmore 1933
      - †P. odessanus Widhalm 1886
      - †P. schreiberi Olson 1999
      - †P. sivalensis Davies 1880
      - †P. tirarensis Miller 1966

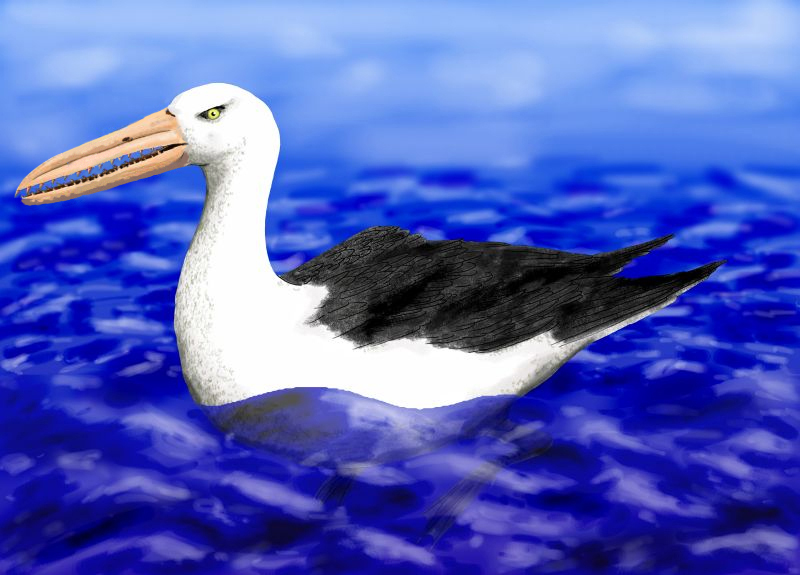
Osteodontornis

- †Pelagornithidae Fürbringer 1888 – pseudotooth birds
  - †Pseudodontornis Lambrecht 1930 [Neodontornis Harrison & Walker 1976; Macrodontopteryx Harrison & Walker 1976; Palaeochenoides Schufeldt 1916] (Late Paleocene – London Clay Early Eocene of England)
    - †P. longidentata Harrison & Walker 1976 [Odontopteryx oweni (Harrison & Walker 1976); Macrodontopteryx oweni Harrison & Walker 1976]
    - †P. tenuirostris Harrison 1985
    - †P. tschulensis (Averianov et al. 1991) [Odontopteryx tschulensis]
    - †P. longirostris (Spulski 1910) Lambrecht 1930 [Odontopteryx longirostris Spulski 1910; Palaeochenoides miocaenus Schufeldt 1916; Pelagornis longirostris (Spulski 1910)]
    - †P. stirtoni Howard & Warter 1969 [Neodontornis stirtoni (Howard & Warter 1969) Harrison & Walker 1976; Pelagornis stirtoni (Howard & Warter 1969)]
  - †Dasornis Owen 1870 [Megalornis Seeley 1866 non Gray 1841; Argillornis Owen 1878] (London Clay Early Eocene of England)
    - †D. abdoun Bourdon 2010
    - †D. emuinus (Bowerbank 1854) Owen 1870 [Lithornis emuinus Bowerbank 1854; Megalornis emuianus (sic) (Bowerbank 1854) Seeley 1866; Neptuniavis miranda Harrison & Walker 1977; Argillornis longipennis Owen 1878; Dasornis londinensis Owen 1869 nomen nudum; Dasornis londinensis Owen 1870; Argillornis emuinus (Bowerbank 1854) Brodkorb 1963; Argillornis longipes Lambrecht 1933 (lapsus)]
    - †D. gigas [Odontopteryx gigas Bourdon 2006 nomen nudum]
  - †Macrodontopteryx (London Clay Early Eocene of England)
  - †Odontopteryx toliapica Owen 1873 [Odontornis (sic) Owen 1873; Neptuniavis minor Harrison & Walker 1977; Dasornis toliapica (Owen 1873)] (London Clay Early Eocene of England)
  - †Gigantornis eaglesomei Andrews 1916 (middle Eocene of Nigeria)
  - †Cyphornis magnus Cope 1894 (Eocene of Vancouver, Canada)
  - †Osteodontornis orri Howard 1957 [Pelagornis orri Howard 1957] (Early Oligocene – Pliocene)
  - †Pelagornis (Middle Miocene of France – Late Pliocene of Morocco)
    - †P. miocaenus Lartet 1857 (Miocene false-tooothed pelican)
    - †P. mauretanicus Mourer-Chauviré & Geraads 2008
    - †P. chilensis Mayr & Rubilar-Rogers 2010
    - †P. sandersi Ksepka 2014
  - †Caspiodontornis kobystanicus Aslanova & Burčak-Abramovič 1982 [?Guguschia nailiae Aslanova & Burčak-Abramovič 1968]
  - †Tympanoneisiotes wetmorei Hopson 1964 [Pelagornis wetmorei (Hopson 1964)]
  - †Lutetodontopteryx tethyensis Mayr & Zvonok 2012
  - †Aequornis traversei Bourdon 2006 nomen nudum
  - Placement unresolved
    - ?Pelagornithidae gen. et sp. indet. (middle Eocene)
- †Xenerodiopidae Rasmussen 1987 (Early Oligocene)
  - †Xenerodiopus mycter Rasmussen, Olson & Simons 1987
- Ardeidae – herons
  - †Ardeagrandis arborea Kurockin & Ganya 1972
  - †Calcardea junnei Gingerich 1987 (Paleocene)
  - †Matuku otagoense Scofield, Worthy & Tennyson 2010
  - †Nyctisoma robusta Elżanowski & Zelenkov 2015
  - †Palaeophoyx columbiana McCoy 1963
  - †Pikaihao bartlei Worthy et al. 2013
  - †Proardea amissa (Milne-Edwards 1892) Lambrecht 1933 [Ardea amissa Milne-Edwards 1892; Egretta amissa (Milne-Edwards 1892) Mlíkovský & Švec 1989] (Late Eocene –? Late Oligocene)
  - †Proardeola walkeri Harrison 1979) [Ardea Formosa Milne-Edwards 1871 (nomen nudum); Ardeola walker (Harrison 1979) Mlíkovský & Švec 1989] – possibly same as Proardea
  - †Zeltornis ginsburgi Balouet 1981 (Early Miocene)
  - Placement unresolved
    - †Anas basaltica Bayer 1882 (Late Oligocene)
  - Extant genera present in the fossil record
    - Nyctanassa
      - †N. kobdoena Kuročkin 1976
    - Ardea (Middle Miocene – Recent)
      - †A. aurelianensis Milne-Edwards 1871 [Proardea aurelianensis (Milne-Edwards 1871)]
      - †A. polkensis Brodkorb 1955
      - †A. howardae Brodkorb 1980
      - †A. paloccidentalis Shufeldt 1892
      - †A. sytchevskayae Zelenkov 2011
    - Egretta (Late Miocene/Early Pliocene – Recent)
      - †E. polgardiensis Kessler 2009
      - †E. subfluvia Becker 1985
    - Butorides (Early Pleistocene – Recent)
      - †B. validipes Campbell 1976
    - Botaurus
      - †B. hibbardi Moseley & Feduccia 1975
    - Syrigma
      - †S. sanctimartini Campbell 1979
- Scopidae – hammerkop
  - Prehistoric species of extant genera
    - †Scopus xenopus Olson 1984
- Threskiornithidae – ibises
  - Threskiornithidae gen. et sp. indet. NMMP-KU 1301 (Pondaung middle Eocene of Paukkaung, Myanmar) – Threskiornithinae?
  - †Gerandibis paganus (Milne-Edwards 1868) De Pietri 2013 [Milnea Lydekker 1891a non Reichenbach 1866; Ibis pagana Milne-Edwards 1868; Eudocimus paganus (Milne-Edvards 1868) Sharpe 1899; Plegadis paganus (Milne-Edvards 1868) Olson 1981; Actiornis pagana (Milne-Edwards 1868) Harrison 1976; Milnea gracilis Lydekker 1891a; Plegadis gracilis (Lydekker 1891) Cheneval 1984 non Miller & Bowman 1956]
  - †Rhynchaeites messelensis Wittich 1898 [Plumumida Hoch 1980; Plumumida lutetialis Hoch 1980] (middle Eocene of Messel, Germany) – may include Mopsitta
  - †Vadaravis brownae Smith, Grande & Clarke 2013
  - Extant genera present in the fossil record
    - Geronticus (Middle Miocene – Recent)
      - †G. perplexus (Milne-Edwards 1869) Cheneval 2000 [Ardea perplexa Milne-Edwards 1869; Proardea perplexus (Milne-Edwards 1869) Gaillard 1939]
      - †G. apelex Olson 1985
      - †G. olsoni Mourer-Chauviré & Geraads 2010
    - Platalea
      - †P. chione (Emslie 1995) [Ajaia chione Emslie 1995]
      - †P. tiangangensis Hou 1987 (Xiacaowan Middle Miocene of Sihong, China)
    - Plegadis
      - †P. pharangites Olson 1981 [Plegadis gracilis Miller & Bowman 1956 non (Lydekker 1891)] (Late Pliocene of WC US)
    - Theristicus
      - †T. wetmorei Campbell 1979 (Late Pleistocene of Peru)
    - Eudocimus
      - †E. leiseyi Emslie 1995a (Early Pleistocene of Florida)
      - †E. peruvianus Campbell 1979 (Late Pleistocene of Peru; may be living species)
      - †Eudocimus sp. (Middle Pliocene of Florida)
- Balaenicipitidae – shoebills
  - Goliathia andrewsi Lambrecht 1930 (Late Eocene/Early Oligocene of Egypt)
  - Paludiavis richae Harrison & Walker 1982 (Late Miocene of Tunisia and Pakistan)

=== Procellariiformes ===
The group that includes modern albatrosses, petrels and storm-petrels.

- Placement unresolved
  - †Eopuffinus kazachstanensis Nesov 1986 (Late Paleocene of Zhylga, Kazakhstan)
  - †Makahala mirae Mayr 2015
  - †Proaestrelata Imber 1985
- †Marinavidae Harrison & Walker 1977
  - †Marinavis longirostris Harrison & Walker 1977
- †Tytthostonychidae Olson & Parris 1987
  - †Tytthostonyx glauconiticus Olson & Parris 1987
- †Diomedeoididae Fischer 1985
  - †Rupelornis van Beneden 1871 [Gaviota Fischer 1983 non Miller & Sibley 1941; Ardeita Cheneval 1996; Diomedeoides Fischer 1985; Frigidafrons Cheneval 1995] (Early Oligocene– Early Miocene of C Europe and Iran)
    - †R. harmati (Kessler 2009) Mayr & Smith 2012 [Diomedeoides harmati Kessler 2009]
    - †R. definitus van Beneden 1871 [Vanellus selysii van Beneden 1871; Anas creccoides van Beneden 1871; Gaviota lipsiensis Fischer 1983; Diomedeoides minimus Fischer 1985; Frigidafrons brodkorbi Cheneval 1995; Ardeita gracilis Cheneval 1996 (nomen nudum); Diomedeoides lipsiensis (Fischer 1983) Mayr et al. 2002; Diomedeoides brodkorbi (Cheneval 1995) Fischer 2003]
    - †R. babaheydariensis (Peters & Hamedani 2000) Mayr & Smith 2012 [Frigidafons babaheydariensis Peters & Hamedani 2000; Diomedeoides babaheydariensis (Peters & Hamedani 2000) Mayr, Peters & Rietschel 2002]
- Oceanitidae
  - Extant genera present in the fossil record
    - Oceanites
      - †O. zaloscarthmus Olson 1985
- Diomedeidae – albatrosses
  - †Murunkus subitus Panteleyev & Nesov 1993 (middle Eocene)
  - †Plotornis Milne-Edwards 1874 [Chenornis Portis 1884] (Early – Middle Miocene)
    - †P. arvernensis (Milne-Edwards 1871) Cheneval 1984a [Puffinus arvernensis Milne-Edwards 1871 nomen nudum; Puffinus arvernensis Shufeldt 1896]
    - †P. deltortrii Milne-Edwards 1874
    - †P. graculoides (Portis 1884) Mayr & Pavia 2014 [Chenornis graculoides Portis 1884]
  - †Tydea septentrionalis Mayr & Smith 2012 (Early Oligocene of the North Sea basin)
  - †Diomedeidae gen. et sp. indet. (Late Oligocene of South Carolina)
  - Extant genera present in the fossil record
    - Diomedea (Middle Miocene – Recent)
      - †D. anglica Lydekker 1891a
      - †D. howardae Chandler 1990
      - †D. milleri Howard 1966
      - †D. rumana Grigorescu & Kessler 1988
      - †D. tanakai Davis 2003
      - †D. thyridata Wilkinson 1969
    - Phoebastria (Middle Miocene – Recent)
      - †P. rexsularum Olson & Rasmussen 2001
    - Thalassarche (Late Miocene – Recent)
      - †T. thyridata
- Hydrobatidae – storm-petrels
  - †Primodroma bournei Harrison & Walker 1977 (Early Eocene)
  - Prehistoric species of extant genera
    - †"Oceanodroma" hubbsi Miller 1951 (Hubbs' Storm-petrel)(Capistrano Middle/Late Miocene of Orange County, US)
    - †Pelagodroma sp. 1
    - Pelagodroma sp. 2
- Procellariidae – petrels
  - †Argyrodyptes microtarsus Ameghino 1905 (San Julián Late Eocene/Early Oligocene of Chubut, Argentina)
  - †Pterodromoides minoricensis Sequí et al. 2001
  - Extant genera present in the fossil record
    - Calonectris (Early Pliocene – Recent)
      - †C. krantzi Olson & Rasmussen 2001
      - †C. kurodai Olson 2009
      - †C. wingatei Olson 2008
    - Fulmarus (Middle Miocene – Recent)
      - †F. hammeri Howard 1968
      - †F. miocaenus Howard 1984
    - Pachyptila (Late Miocene– Recent)
      - †P. salax Olson 1985
    - Pelecanoides (Early/Middle Miocene – Recent)
      - †P. cymatotrypetes Olson 1985
      - †P. miokuaka Worthy et al. 2007 (Miocene diving petrel)
      - †P. urinatrix Gmelin 1789
    - "Pterodroma" (Pleistocene – Recent)
      - †P. kurodai Harrison & Walker 1978
      - †P. rupinarum Olson 1975
    - Puffinus (Early Oligocene – Recent)
      - †P. aquitanicus (Milne-Edwards) Brodkorb 1963 Procellaria aquitanica Milne-Edwards 1874
      - †P. antiquus (Milne-Edwards) Brodkorb 1963c Procellaria antiqua Milne-Edwards 1874
      - †P. barnesi Howard 1978
      - †P. calhouni Howard 1968
      - †P. conradi Marsh 1870
      - †P. diatomicus Miller 1925
      - †P. felthami Howard 1949
      - †P. gilmorei Chandler 1990
      - †P. inceptor Wetmore 1930
      - †P. kanakoffi Howard 1949
      - †P. micraulax Brodkorb 1963
      - †P. mitchelli Miller 1961
      - †P. nestori Alcover 1989
      - †P. priscus Miller 1961
      - †P. raemdonckii (Van Beneden 1871) Brodkorb 1962 [Larus Raemdonckii Beneden 1871]
      - †P. tedfordi Howard 1971

=== Gaviiformes ===
- †Gaviella pusilla (Shufeldt 1915) Wetmore 1940
- †Nasidytes ypresianus (Mayr & Kitchener, 2022)
- Gaviidae – loons
  - †Colymboides Milne-Edwards 1867 [Dyspetornis Oberholser 1905; Hydrornis Milne-Edwards 1867 non Blyth 1843; Davisona Mathews 1935; Megagallinula Kuročkin 1968] (Late Eocene – Early Miocene) – paraphyletic?
    - †C. harundinea (Kuročkin 1968) Megagallinula harundinea Kuročkin 1968)
    - †C. metzleri Mayr 2004
    - †C. anglicus Lydekker 1891a
    - †C. belgicus Mayr & Smith 2002
    - †C. minutus Milne-Edwards 1867
  - Placement unresolved
    - "Gavia" portisi (Late Pliocene of Orciano Pisano, Italy) – rentatively placed here. A nomen dubium?
  - Extant genera present in the fossil record
    - Gavia (Early Miocene – Recent)
      - †G. egeriana Švec 1982
      - †G. brodkorbi Howard 1978
      - †G. paradoxa Umanskaja 1981
      - †G. schultzi Mlíkovsky 1998
      - †G. howardae Brodkorb 1953c
      - †G. moldavica Kessler 1984
      - †G. concinna Wetmore 1940 [Gavia palaeodytes Wetmore 1943]
      - †G. fortis Olson & Rasmussen 2001

=== Sphenisciformes ===
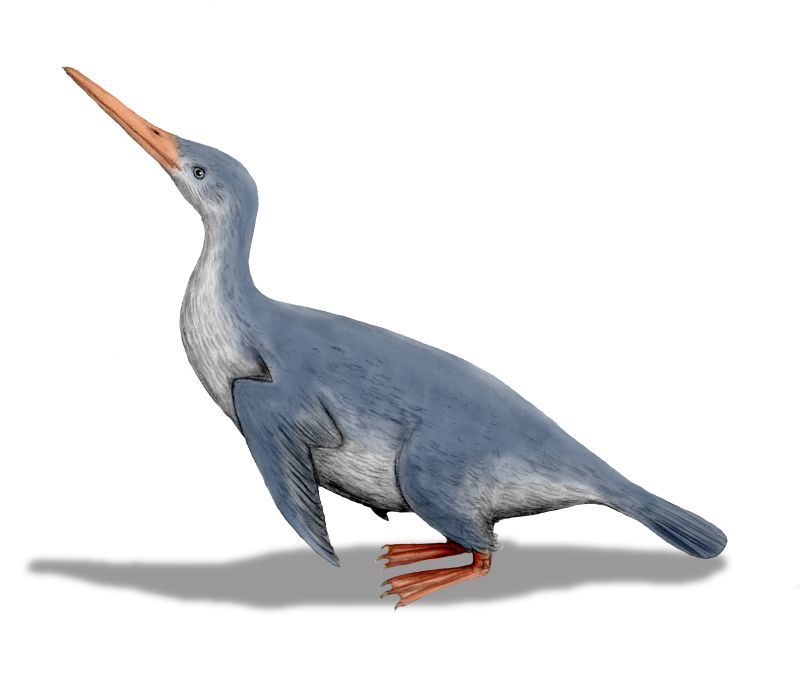
Waimanu

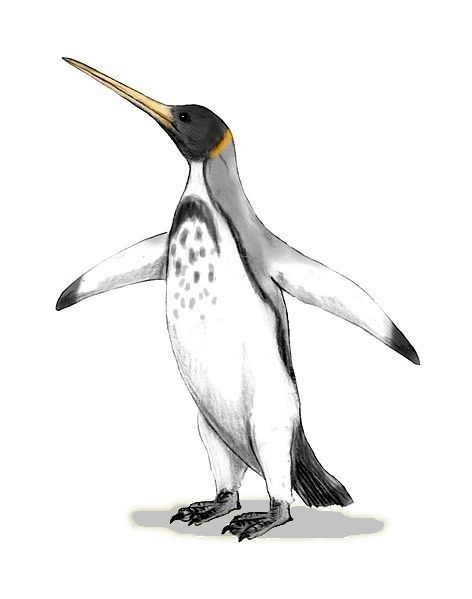
Icadyptes

- Unresolved and basal forms
  - †Waimanu Jones, Ando & Fordyce 2006 (Early – Late Palaeocene)
    - †W. manneringi Jones, Ando & Fordyce 2006 (Mannering's penguin)
    - †W. tuatahi Jones, Ando & Fordyce 2006 (Waipara penguin)
  - †Perudyptes devriesi Clarke et al. 2007 – basal? (middle Eocene)
  - Sphenisciformes gen. et sp. indet. CADIC P 21 (middle Eocene)
- Spheniscidae – penguins
  - †Kaiika maxwelli Fordyce & Tomas 2011
  - †Palaeoapterodytes ictus (Ameghino 1891) Ameghino 1905 (nomen dubium) [Apterodytes Ameghino 1891 non Hermann 1783; Apterodytes ictus Ameghino 1891]
  - †Tereingaornis moisleyi Scarlett 1983 (Moisley's penguin)
  - †Crossvallia unienwillia Tambussi et al. 2005 (Late Paleocene)
  - †Anthropornis Wiman 1905 (mid-Eocene –? Early Oligocene)
    - †A. nordenskjoeldii Wiman 1905 (Nordenskjoeld's giant penguin)
    - †A. grandis (Wiman 1905) [Arthrodytes grandis (Ameghino 1901) Ameghino 1905]
  - †Archaeospheniscus Marples 1952 (mid-/Late Eocene – Late Oligocene)
    - †A. lowei Marples 1952 (Lowe's penguin)
    - †A. lopdelli Marples 1952 (Lopdell's penguin)
  - †Delphinornis Wiman 1905 [Notodyptes Marples 1953] (mid-/Late Eocene –? Early Oligocene)
    - †D. gracilis Myrcha et al. 2002
    - †D. larseni Wiman 1905
    - †D. arctowskii Myrcha et al. 2002
    - †D. wimani (Marples 1953) Ksepka & Clarke 2010 [Notodyptes wimani Marples 1953; Archaeospheniscus wimani (Marples 1953) Simpson 1971a]
  - †Palaeeudyptes Huxley 1859 [Eosphaeniscus Wiman 1905] (mid-/Late Eocene – Late Oligocene)
    - †P. klekowskii Myrcha, Tatur & del Valle 1990
    - †P. gunnari (Wiman 1905) [Eosphaeniscus gunnari Wiman 1905]
  - †Icadyptes salasi Clarke et al. 2007 (Late Eocene)
  - †Inkayacu paracasensis Clarke et al. 2010 (Late Eocene)
  - †Pachydyptes ponderosus Oliver 1930 (Late Eocene)
  - †Marambiornis exilis Myrcha et al. 2002 (Late Eocene–? Early Oligocene)
  - †Mesetaornis polaris Myrcha et al. 2002 (Late Eocene –? Early Oligocene)
  - †Tonniornis Tambussi et al. 2006 (Late Eocene –? Early Oligocene)
    - †T. mesetaensis Tambussi et al. 2006
    - †T. minimum Tambussi et al. 2006
  - †Wimanornis seymourensis Simpson 1971 (Late Eocene –? Early Oligocene)
  - †Arthrodytes andrewsi Ameghino 1901 (Late Eocene/Early Oligocene – Early Miocene)
  - †Duntroonornis parvus Marples 1953 (Duntroon penguin) (Late Oligocene)
  - †Kairuku Ksepka et al. 2012 (Late Oligocene)
    - †K. grebneffi Ksepka et al. 2012
    - †K. waitaki Ksepka et al. 2012
  - †Korora oliveri Marples 1952 (Oliver's penguin) (Late Oligocene)
  - †Platydyptes Marples 1952 (Late Oligocene)
    - †P. marplesi (Brodkorb 1963) Simpson 1971 [Palaeeudyptes marplesi Brodkorb 1963] (Simpson's/Marples' penguin)
    - †P. novaezealandiae(Oliver 1930) Marples 1952 (wide-flippered penguin)
    - †P. amiesi Marples 1952 (Amies' penguin)
  - †Eretiscus tonnii (Simpson 1981) Olson 1986 [Microdytes Simpson 1981 non Balfour-Browne 1949; Microdytes tonnii Simpson 1981] (Patagonia Early Miocene)
  - †Palaeospheniscus Moreno & Mercerat 1891 [Neculus Ameghino 1905; Paraspheniscus Ameghino 1905 nec Hendel 1927; Perispheniscus Ameghino 1905; Pseudospheniscus Ameghino 1905; Chubutodyptes Simpson 1970] (Early? – Late Miocene/Early Pliocene)
    - †P. huxleyorum Simpson 1973
    - †P. wimani (Ameghino 1905) [Perispheniscus wimani Ameghino 1905; Palaeospheniscus robustus (partim) Simpson 1946]
    - †P. gracilis Ameghino 1899 [?Delphinornis gracilis; Palaeospheniscus nereius Ameghino 1901; Neculus rothi Ameghino 1905; Palaeospheniscus rothi Ameghino 1905; Paraspheniscus nereius (Ameghino 1901) Ameghino 1905; Palaeospheniscus medianus Ameghino 1905]
    - †P. patagonicus Moreno & Mercerat 1891 [Palaeospheniscus menzbieri Moreno & Mercerat 1891; Palaeospheniscus interruptus Ameghino 1905; Palaeospheniscus intermedius Ameghino 1905; Palaeospheniscus affinis Ameghino 1905]
    - †P. bergi Moreno & Mercerat 1891 [Paraspheniscus bergi (Moreno & Mercerat 1891) Ameghino 1905; Palaeospheniscus planus Ameghino 1905; Palaeospheniscus interplanus Ameghino 1905; Pseudospheniscus interplanus Ameghino 1905; Pseudospheniscus planus Ameghino 1905 nom rej.; Pseudospheniscus concavus Ameghino 1905; Pseudospheniscus convexus Ameghino 1905 nom rej.]
    - †P. biloculata (Simpson 1970) Acosta Hospitaleche 2007 [Chubutodyptes biloculata Simpson 1970]
  - †Paraptenodytes Ameghino 1891 [Isotremornis Ameghino 1905; Metancylornis Ameghino 1905; Treleudytes Ameghino 1905] (Early – Late Miocene/Early Pliocene)
    - †P. brodkorbi Simpson 1972 [Isotremornis nordenskjöldi Ameghino 1905 (partim)]
    - †P. robustus (Ameghino 1895) [Palaeospheniscus robustus Ameghino 1895; Perispheniscus robustus (Ameghino 1895) Brodkorb 1963; Paraptenodytes curtus Ameghino 1901; Metancylornis curtus (Ameghino 1901) Ameghino 1905; Paraptenodytes grandis Ameghino 1901; Arthrodytes grandis (Ameghino 1901) Ameghino 1905; Paraptenodytes andrewsi Ameghino 1901; Arthrodytes andrewsi (Ameghino 1901) Ameghino 1905; Treleudytes crassus Ameghino 1905]
    - †P. antarcticus (Huxley 1859) Ameghino 1891 [Palaeeudyptes antarcticus Huxley 1859 non Hector 1873; Palaeospheniscus antarcticus (Huxley 1859) Moreno & Mercerat 1891] (narrow-flippered penguin)
  - †Anthropodyptes gilli Simpson 1959 (Middle Miocene)
  - †Madrynornis mirandus Hospitaleche et al. 2007 (Late Miocene)
  - †Pseudaptenodytes Simpson 1970 (Late Miocene/Early Pliocene)
    - †P. minor Simpson 1970
    - †P. macraei Simpson 1970
  - †Dege hendeyi Simpson 1979 (Early Pliocene)
  - †Marplesornis novaezealandiae (Marples 1960) Simpson 1972 [Paleospheniscus novaezealandiae Marples 1960] (Harris penguins) (Early Pliocene)
  - †Nucleornis insolitus Simpson 1979 (Early Pliocene)
  - †Inguza predemersus (Simpson 1971) Simpson 1975 [Spheniscus predemersus Simpson 1971] (Late Pliocene)
  - Placement unresolved
    - Spheniscidae gen. et sp. indet (Late Oligocene/Early Miocene of Hakataramea, New Zealand)
  - Extant genera present in the fossil record
    - Pygoscelis (Middle/Late Miocene – Recent)
      - †P. calderensis Walsh & Suárez 2006
      - †P. tyreei Simpson 1972 (Tyree's penguin)
      - †P. grandis Walsh & Suárez 2006
    - Spheniscus (Middle/Late Miocene – Recent)
      - †S. muizoni Göhlich 2007
      - †S. chilensis Emslie & Correa 2003
      - †S. megaramphus Stucchi, Urbina & Giraldo 2003
      - †S. urbinai Stucchi 2002
    - Aptenodytes (Early? Pliocene – Recent)
      - †A. ridgeni Simpson 1972 [Arthrodytes ridgeni (Simpson 1972)] (Ridgen's Penguin)
    - Eudyptes
      - †E. calauina Hoffmeister et al. 2014

=== Pterocliformes ===
- Pteroclidae – sandgrouse
  - †Gerandia calcaria (Milne-Edwards 1869) Lambrecht 1933 [Columba calcaria Milne-Edwards 1869] (Early Miocene)
  - †Leptoganga sepultus (Milne-Edwards 1869) Mourer-Chauviré 1993 [Pterocles sepultus Milne-Edwards 1869]
  - †Archaeoganga Mourer-Chauviré 1992
    - †A. validus(Milne-Edwards 1892) [Pterocles validus Milne-Edwards 1892]
    - †A. pinguis Mourer-Chauviré 1992
    - †A. larvatus (Milne-Edwards 1892) [Pterocles larvatus Milne-Edwards 1892]
  - Extant genera present in the fossil record
    - Syrrhaptes
      - †S. kashini Kuročkin 1985

=== Columbiformes ===
- Columbidae – doves and pigeons
  - Arenicolumba (Early Miocene) – doubtfully distinct from Patagioenas
  - Rupephaps (Early Miocene)
  - Placement unresolved
    - Columbidae gen. et sp. indet. (Early/Middle Miocene)
  - Extant genera present in the fossil record
    - Columba (Early Pliocene – Recent)
    - Patagioenas (Early Pliocene – Recent)

=== Psittaciformes ===
Unresolved and basal fossil parrots:

- Psittacopes (Early/middle Eocene)
- Serudaptus – pseudasturid or psittacid?
- Pseudasturidae (= Halcyornithidae?)
- Messelasturidae Mayr 2005
  - Tynskya eocaena Mayr 2000 (Early Eocene of N America and England)
  - Messelastur gratulator Peters 1994 (middle Eocene of Messel, Germany)
  - Pseudasturidae FU 125 gen. et sp. indet. (Early Eocene)
  - Pseudasturides – formerly Pseudastur
- Vastanavidae
  - Vastanavis (Early Eocene of Vastan, India)
- Quercypsittidae
  - Quercypsitta (Late Eocene)
- Cacatuidae
  - Extant genera present in the fossil record
    - Cacatua (Early Miocene – Recent)
- Psittacidae – parrots, parakeets and lories
  - Archaeopsittacus (Late Oligocene/Early Miocene)
  - Xenopsitta (Early Miocene)
  - Psittacidae gen. et spp. indet. (Early/Middle Miocene) – several species
  - Bavaripsitta (Middle Miocene)
  - Psittacidae gen. et sp. indet. (Middle Miocene) – erroneously placed in Pararallus dispar, includes "Psittacus lartetianus
  - Extant and recently extinct genera present in the fossil record
    - Conuropsis (Early? Miocene – Holocene)
    - Nandayus (Late Pliocene – Recent)
    - Cyanoliseus (Middle Pleistocene – Recent)
    - Aratinga (Late Pleistocene – Recent)
    - Rhynchopsitta (Late Pleistocene – Recent)
- Strigopidae – New Zealand parrots, kākāpō
  - Nelepsittacus (Middle Miocene)
  - Heracles (Middle Miocene)

=== Opisthocomiformes ===
Hoatzins

- Opisthocomidae Swainson 1837 [Foratidae Olson 1992; Onychopterygidae Cracraft 1971]
  - †Foro panarium Olson 1992 (Early Eocene) - cuculiform?
  - †Hoatzi panarium Thomas 1996
  - †Onychopteryx simpsoni Cracraft 1971 (Early Eocene of Argentina) – falconid? A nomen dubium
  - †Protoazin parisiensis Mayr & De Pietri 2014
  - †Namibiavis senutae Mourer-Chauviré 2003 (Late Oligocene of Namibia)
  - †Hoazinavis lacustris Alvarenga, Mayr & Mourer-Chauviré 2011 (Miocene of Brazil)
  - †Hoazinoides magdalenae Miller 1953 (Late Miocene of Colombia)

=== Musophagiformes ===
- Musophagidae – turacos
  - Placement unresolved
    - Musophagidae gen. et sp. indet. (Late Oligocene – Middle Miocene of WC Europe)
    - Musophagidae gen. et sp. indet. (Egypt)
  - †Veflintornis Kashin 1976 [Apopempsis Brodkorb 1971 non Schenkling 1903] (Middle Miocene)
    - †V. meini (Ballmann 1969) [Musophaga meini Ballmann 1969]
    - †V. africanus (Harrison 1980) [Musophaga africanus Harrison 1980; Apopempsis africanus (Harrison 1980)] (Early Miocene)

=== Cuculiformes ===
Cuckoos, turacos and allies.

- Placement unresolved
  - Cuculiformes gen. et sp. indet. (Early Eocene)
- Cuculidae – cuckoos
  - Eocuculus (Late Eocene)
  - Dynamopterus (Late Eocene/Early Oligocene)
  - Neococcyx (Early Oligocene)
  - Cursoricoccyx (Early Miocene)
  - Placement unresolved
    - Cuculidae gen. et sp. indet. (Early Pliocene)

=== Accipitriformes ===
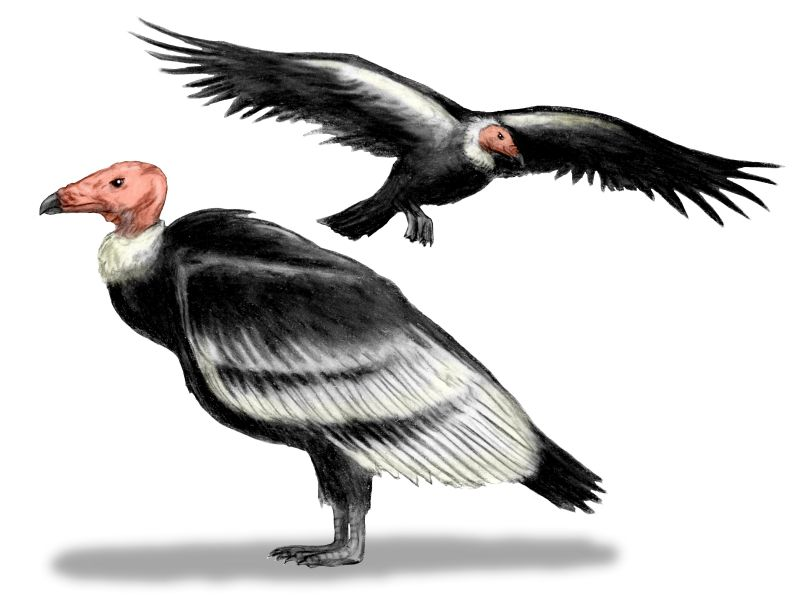
Teratornis

- †Teratornithidae Miller 1909– teratorns
  - †Argentavis magnificens Campbell & Tonni 1980 (Late Miocene)
  - †Aiolornis incredibilis (Howard 1952) Campbell, Scott & Springer 1999 [Teratornis incredibilis Howard 1952] (Early Pliocene – Late Pleistocene)
  - †Oscaravis olsoni (Arredondo & Arredondo 2002) Suarez & Olson 2009 [Teratornis olsoni Arredondo & Arredondo 2002] (Cuban teratorn)(Pleistocene)
  - †Cathartornis gracilis Miller 1910
  - †Taubatornis campbelli Olson & Alvarenga 2002
  - †Teratornis Miller 1909 (Early Pleistocene – Late Pleistocene)
    - †T. woodburnensis Campbell & Stenger 2002
    - †T. merriami Miller 1909 (Merriam's teratorn)
- Cathartidae – New World vultures
  - †Brasilogyps faustoi Alvarenga 1985 (Late Oligocene – Early Miocene)
  - †Kuntur cardenasi Stucchi et al. 2015
  - †Pleistovultur nevesi Alvarenga et al. 2008
  - †Tapinopus ellioti Milne-Edwards 1891
  - †Diatropornis ellioti (European vulture) (Late Eocene/Early Oligocene –? middle Oligocene)
  - †Phasmagyps patritus Wetmore 1927 (Early Oligocene)
  - †Hadrogyps aigialeus Emslie 1988 (American dwarf vulture) (Middle Miocene)
  - †Pliogyps Becker 1986 (Miocene vulture) (Late Miocene – Late Pliocene)
    - †P. charon Becker 1986
    - †P. fisheri Tordoff 1959
  - †Perugyps diazi Stucchi & Emslie 2005 (Peruvian vulture) (Late Miocene/Early Pliocene)
  - †Dryornis (Argentinean vulture) Moreno & Mercerat, 1891 (Early Miocene – Late Pliocene) – similar to the extant genus Vultur
    - †D. pampeanus Moreno & Mercerat, 1891
    - †D. hatcheri Degrange 2022
  - †Aizenogyps toomeyae Emslie 1998 (South American vulture) (Late Pliocene)
  - †Breagyps clarki Miller 1938 (long-legged vulture) (Late Pleistocene)
  - †Geronogyps reliquus Campbell 1979 (Late Pleistocene)
  - †Wingegyps cartellei Alvarenga & Olson 2004 (Amazonian vulture) (Late Pleistocene)
  - †Parasarcoramphus milneedwardsi Mourer-Chauviré 2002
  - Placement unresolved
    - Cathartidae gen. et sp. indet. (Late Oligocene of Mongolia)
    - Cathartidae gen. et sp. indet. (Late Miocene/Early Pliocene of Lee Creek Mine, US)
    - Cathartidae gen. et sp. indet. (Middle Pliocene of Argentina)
    - Cathartidae gen. et sp. indet. (Cuba)
  - Extant genera present in the fossil record
    - Sarcoramphus (Middle Pliocene –? Recent)
      - †S. kernense' (Kern vulture)
      - †S. fischeri Campbell 1979
    - Gymnogyps (Early Pleistocene – Recent)
      - †G. howardae' Campbell 1979
      - †G. kofordi' Emslie 1988
    - Vultur (Pliocene – Recent)– distinctiveness disputed
      - †V. fossilis Moreno & Mercerat 1891 [Cathartes fossilis; Sarcoramphus fossilis]
- †Horusornithidae Mourer-Chauviré 1991
  - †Horusornis vianeyliaudae Mourer-Chauviré 1991 (Late Eocene)
- Pandionidae – ospreys
  - Extant genera present in the fossil record
    - Pandion (Early Oligocene – Recent)
      - †P. lovensis Becker 1985
      - †P. homalopteron Warter 1976
- Sagittariidae – secretarybirds
  - †Amanuensis pickfordi Mourer-Chauviré 2003
  - †Pelargopappus Stejneger 1885(Late Eocene/Early Oligocene – Late Oligocene/Early Miocene of France) – formerly Amphiserpentarius/Amynoptilon/Pelargopsis
    - †P. schlosseri
    - †P. magnus
- Accipitridae – hawks, eagles and Old World vultures
  - Milvoides (Late Eocene)
  - Aquilavus (Late Eocene/Early Oligocene – Early Miocene)
  - Palaeocircus (Late Eocene/Early Oligocene)
  - Palaeastur (Early Miocene)
  - Pengana (Early Miocene)
  - Promilio (Early Miocene)
  - Proictinia (Early – Late Miocene/Early Pliocene)
  - Neophrontops (Early/middle Miocene – Late Pleistocene) – formerly in Neophron
  - Mioaegypius (middle Miocene)
  - Apatosagittarius (Late Miocene)
  - Gansugyps (Late Miocene)
  - Palaeoborus (Miocene)
  - Qiluornis (Miocene)
  - Thegornis (Miocene)
  - Garganoaetus (Early Pliocene)
  - Amplibuteo (Late Pliocene of Peru – Late Pleistocene) – Belongs to the extant genus Buteogallus
  - Cryptogyps (Middle – Late Pleistocene)
  - Neogyps (Late Pleistocene)
  - Palaeohierax – includes "Aquila" gervaisii
  - Placement unresolved
    - Accipitridae gen. et sp. indet. AMNH FR 7434 (Early Eocene)
    - Accipitridae gen. et sp. indet. (Early Oligocene)
    - Accipitridae gen. et sp. indet. (Early/Middle Miocene)
    - Accipitridae gen. et sp. indet. MPEF-PV-2523 (Late Miocene)
    - Accipitridae gen. et sp. indet. (Early/Middle Pliocene) – Parabuteo?
    - Accipitridae gen. et sp. indet. (Late Pliocene/Early Pleistocene) – Buteo?
    - Accipitridae gen. et sp. indet. (Egypt)
    - "Aquila" danana (Late Miocene/Early Pliocene) – formerly also Geranoaetus or Buteo
  - Extant genera present in the fossil record
    - Haliaeetus (Early Oligocene – Recent)
    - Buteo (middle Oligocene – Recent)
    - Aquila (Middle Miocene – Recent)
    - Buteogallus (Middle Miocene – Recent) – might include Harpyhaliaetus
    - "Hieraaetus" (Middle Miocene – Recent) – doubtfully distinct from Aquila
    - Milvus (Early Pleistocene – Recent)
    - Gyps (Middle Pleistocene – Recent)
    - Aegypius (Middle Pleistocene – Recent)
  - Additional prehistoric species of extant genera
    - Spizaetus grinnelli (Rancho La Brea Late Pleistocene of California, US) – formerly Geranoaetus or Buteo
    - Spizaetus pliogryps – formerly Aquila
    - Gypaetus georgii (Late Miocene)
    - Neophron lolis (Late Miocene)

=== Falconiformes ===
- †Masillaraptoridae Mayr 2009
  - †Masillaraptor parvunguis Mayr 2006 (middle Eocene of Messel, Germany)
  - †Danielsraptor phorusrhacoides Mayr & Kitchener 2022 (early Eocene of Essex, England)
- Falconidae – falcons
  - †Lagopterus minutus Moreno & Mercerat 1891
  - †Parvulivenator watteli Harrison 1982 (Early Eocene)
  - †Stintonornis mitchelli Harrison 1984 (Early Eocene)
  - †Badiostes patagonicus Ameghino 1895 (Early Miocene)
  - †Pediohierax ramenta (Wetmore 1936) Becker 1987 [Falco ramenta Wetmore 1936] - (Middle Miocene)
  - †Thegornis musculosus Ameghino 1895 [Thegornis debilis Ameghino 1895; Buteo musculosus (Ameghino 1895) Agnolin 2006]
    - †Petrosushkinia pliocaena (Tugarinov 1935) Zelenkov 2015 [Sushkinia Tugarinov 1935 non Martynov 1930; Sushkinia pliocaena Tugarinov 1935] (Early Pliocene)
    - †Falconidae gen. et sp. indet. (Late Miocene)
  - Extant genera present in the fossil record
    - Milvago (Late Pleistocene -–Recent)
      - †M. alexandri Olson 1976
      - †M. brodkorbi Campbell 1979
    - Falco (Late Miocene – Recent)
      - †F. antiquus Mourer-Chauviré 1975
      - †F. bakalovi Boev 1999
      - †F. bulgaricus Boev 2011
      - †F. chowi Hou 1982
      - †F. hezhengensis Li et al. 2014
      - †F. medius Umanskaya 1981
      - †F. oregonus Brodkorb 1964
      - †F. pisanus Portis 1887
      - †F. umanskajae Sobolev 2003

=== Steatornithiformes ===
- Paraprefica Mayr 1999 (Early Eocene?)
  - †P. kelleri Mayr 1999
  - †P. major Mayr 1999
- Steatornithidae – oilbirds
  - †Prefica nivea Olson 1987
  - Prehistoric species of extant genera
    - Steatornis sp.
- Nyctibiidae – potoos
  - †Euronyctibius kurochkini Mourer-Chauviré 1989

=== Podargiformes ===
- †Fluvioviridavidae Mayr 2005
  - †Fluvioviridavis platyrhamphus Mayr & Daniels 2001 (Green River Early Eocene of N America)
- Podargidae – frogmouths
  - †Masillapodargus longipes Mayr 1999
  - †Quercypodargus olsoni Mourer-Chauvire 1989

=== Caprimulgiformes ===
- Caprimulgidae – nightjars
  - †Ventivorus ragei Mourer-Chauviré 1988
  - Prehistoric species of extant genera
    - Caprimulgus
      - †C. piurensis Campbell 1979

=== Aegotheliformes ===
Owlet-nightjars

- Aegothelidae
  - †Quipollornis koniberi Rich & McEvey 1977 (Early/Middle Miocene)
  - Extant genera present in the fossil record
    - Aegotheles (Early/Middle Miocene – Recent)
      - †A. savesi Layard & Layard 1881 (New Caledonian owlet-nightjar)
      - †A. zealandivetus Worthy et al., 2022

=== Apodiformes ===
Swifts and hummingbirds.

- †Wyomingcypselus pohli Weidig 2003 nomen nudum
- †Procypseloides mourerchauvireae (Mlíkovský) Harrison & Walker 1977 (Late Eocene/Early Oligocene – Early Miocene)
- †Laputavis robusta (Dyke 2001a) Dyke 2001b [Laputa Dyke 2001a non; Laputa robusta Dyke 2001a]
- †Palescyvus escampensis Karhu 1988
- †Scaniacypselus Harrison 1984 (Early – middle Eocene)
  - †S. wardi Harrison 1984
  - †S. szarskii (Peters 1985) Meyr & Peters 1999 [Aegialornis szarskii Peters 1985; Primapus szarskii (Peters 1985) Mourer-Chauviré 1988]
- †Aegialornithidae Lydekker 1891
  - †Primapus lacki Harrison & Walker 1975 [?Procuculus minutus Harrison & Walker 1977] (Early Eocene) ?apodid
  - †Aegialornis Lydekker 1891 [Tachyornis Milne-Edwards 1892; Belornis Milne-Edwards 1893; Mesogiornis Mlíkovský 2002](Early? – Late Eocene)
    - †A. leenhardti
    - †A. germanicus Mlíkovský 2002
    - †A. gallicus Lydekker 1891 [Tachyornis hirundo Milne-Edwards 1891]
    - †A. wetmorei Collins 1976 [Mesogiornis wetmorei (Collins 1976) Mlíkovský 2002]
    - †A. broweri Collins 1976 [Mesogiornis broweri (Collins 1976) Mlíkovský 2002]
- †Eocypselidae Harrison 1984 – apodiform (hemiprocnid?)? caprimulgiform? basal Cypselomorphae?
  - †Eocypselus Harrison 1984 (Late Paleocene ?- Early Eocene of NC Europe)
    - †E. vincenti Harrison 1984
    - †E. rowei Ksepka et al. 2013
- †Cypselavidae Mourer-Chauviré 2006
  - †Parargornis messelensis Mayr 2003 (middle Eocene) jungornithid, trochilid, basal as Argornis?
  - †Argornis caucasicus Karhu 1999 (Late Eocene) ?Trochilidae
  - †Cypselavus gallicus Gaillard 1908 (Late Eocene Early Oligocene) aegialornithid or hemiprocnid
- †Jungornithidae Karhu 1988
  - †Jungornis Karhu 1988 (Early Oligocene of N Caucasus, Russia)
    - †J. tesselatus Karhu 1988
    - †J. geraldmayri Mourer-Chauviré & Sigé 2006
- Trochilidae hummingbirds
  - †Eurotrochilus Mayr 2004 (Early Oligocene)
    - †E. inexpectatus Mayr 2004
    - †E. noniewiczi Bochenski & Bochenski 2008
  - Placement unresolved
    - Trochilidae sp. et gen. indet. (Bahamas, West Indies)
    - Trochilidae sp. et gen. indet. (Brazil)
- Apodidae – swifts
  - Extant genera present in the fossil record
    - Collocalia (Early Miocene – Recent)
    - Apus (Middle/Late Miocene – Recent)
    - Chaetura (Late Miocene – Recent)
    - Tachornis (Late Pleistocene – Recent)

=== Coliiformes ===
Mousebirds and relatives

- Unresolved and basal forms
  - †Botauroides parvus Shufeldt 1915 (Eocene of Wyoming, US)
  - †Eobucco brodkorbi Feduccia & Martin 1976 - sandcoleid?
  - †Eocolius walkeri Dyke & Waterhouse 2001 (London Clay Early Eocene of Walton-on-the-Naze, England) - sandcoleid or coliid
  - †Limnatornis Milne-Edwards 1871 (Early Miocene of Saint-Gérand-le-Puy, France) - coliid? (Urocolius?)
  - †Coliiformes gen. et sp. indet. (Late Miocene of Kohfidisch, Austria)
  - †Uintornis Marsh 1872 - sandcoleid?
- Family †Chascacocoliidae Zelenkov & Dyke 2008
  - Genus †Chascacocolius Houde & Olson 1992 (Late Paleocene ?- Early Eocene) - basal? sandcoleid?
- Family †Selmeidae Zelenkov & Dyke 2008
  - †Selmes absurdipes Peters 1999 (Middle Eocene ?-Late Oligocene of C Europe) - coliid? (synonym of Primocolius?)
- Family †Sandcoleidae Houde & Olson 1992 sensu Mayr & Mourer-Chauviré 2004
  - †Sandcoleus copiosus Houde & Olson 1992 (Paleocene)
  - †Anneavis anneae Houde & Olson 1992
  - †Eoglaucidium pallas Fischer 1987
- Family Coliidae Swainson 1837 sensu Mayr & Mourer-Chauviré 2004
  - †Primocolius Mourer-Chauviré 1988 (Late Eocene/Oligocene of Quercy, France)
  - †Oligocolius Mayr 2000 (Early Oligocene of Frauenweiler, Germany)
  - †Masillacolius brevidactylus Mayr & Peters 1998 (middle Eocene of Messel, Germany)
  - Extant genera present in the fossil record
    - Colius [Necrornis Milne-Edwards 1871]

=== †Zealandornithidae ===
- †Zealandornis relictus Worthy et al., 2022 (Early Miocene of Otago, New Zealand)

=== Strigiformes ===
Owls and barn owls

- Unresolved and basal forms
  - Berruornis (Late Paleocene) – basal? Sophornithidae?
  - Strigiformes gen. et sp. indet. (Late Paleocene)
  - Palaeoglaux (middle – Late Eocene) – own family Palaeoglaucidae or Strigidae?
  - Palaeobyas (Late Eocene/Early Oligocene) – Tytonidae? Sophiornithidae?
  - Palaeotyto (Late Eocene/Early Oligocene) – Tytonidae?
  - Strigiformes gen. et spp. indet. (Early Oligocene)
- Ogygoptyngidae
  - Ogygoptynx (Middle/Late Paleocene)
- Protostrigidae
  - Eostrix (Early – middle Eocene)
  - Minerva (middle – Late Eocene) – formerly Protostrix, includes "Aquila" ferox, "Aquila" lydekkeri, and "Bubo" leptosteus
  - Oligostrix (middle Oligocene)
- Sophiornithidae
  - Sophiornis
- Strigidae – typical owls
  - Mioglaux (Late Oligocene? – Early Miocene) – includes "Bubo" poirreiri
  - Intulula (Early/Middle –? Late Miocene) – includes "Strix/Ninox" brevis
  - Alasio (Middle Miocene) – includes "Strix" collongensis
  - Oraristrix (Late Pleistocene)
  - Miosurnia (Late Miocene)
  - Placement unresolved
    - "Otus" wintershofensis (Early/Middle Miocene) – may be close to extant genus Ninox
    - "Strix" edwardsi (Middle/Late? Miocene)
    - "Asio" pygmaeus (Early Pliocene)
    - Strigidae gen. et sp. indet. UMMP V31030 (Late Pliocene) – Strix/Bubo?
  - Extant genera present in the fossil record
    - Strix (Early Miocene – Recent)
    - Bubo (Late Miocene? – Recent)
    - Asio (Late Pliocene – Recent)
    - Athene (Late Pliocene – Recent)
    - Glaucidium (Late Pliocene – Recent)
    - Surnia (Late Pliocene – Recent)
    - Pulsatrix (Late Pleistocene – Recent)
- Tytonidae – barn owls
  - Nocturnavis (Late Eocene/Early Oligocene)
  - Selenornis (Late Eocene/Early Oligocene)
  - Necrobyas (Late Eocene/Early Oligocene – Early Miocene)
  - Prosybris (Early Oligocene? – Early Miocene)
  - Placement unresolved
    - Tytonidae gen. et sp. indet. TMT 164 (Middle Miocene)
  - Extant genera present in the fossil record
    - Tyto (Late Miocene – Recent)

=== Coraciiformes ===
Rollers and allies. Probably paraphyletic.

- Basal and unresolved forms
  - †Quasisyndactylus longibrachis Mayr 1998 (middle Eocene) – alcediniform, basal?
  - †Paracoracias occidentalis Clarke et al. 2009
  - †Cryptornis antiquus Gervais 1848–52 [nomen nudum] (Late Eocene) – bucerotid? geranopterid?
  - †Protornis glarniensis von Meyer 1856 (Oligocene) – basal to motmotids and meropids?
  - † Coraciiformes gen. et spp. indet. PQ 1216, QU 15640 (Late Eocene) – 2 species
- †Geranopteridae Mayr & Mourer-Chauviré 2000
  - †Geranopterus Milne-Edvards 1892 (Late Eocene – Early Miocene)
    - †G. alatus (Mayr & Mourer-Chauvire 2000)
    - †G. bohemicus (Mlikovsky 1999) Mourer-Chauvire 1999 [Nupharanassa bohemica Mlikovsky 1999]
    - †G. milneendwardsi Mayr & Mourer-Chauvire 2000
- †Eocoraciidae Mayr & Mourer-Chauviré 2000
  - †Eocoracias brachyptera Mayr & Mourer-Chauviré 2000 (middle Eocene)
- †Primobucconidae Feduccia & Martin 1976 sensu Mayr, Mourer-Chauviré & Weidig 2004
  - †Primobucco Brodkorb 1970 [Neanis Brodkorb 1965 non Gistl 1848] (Early – middle Eocene)
    - †P. kestneri Feduccia 1973 [Neanis kestneri (Feduccia 1973) Feduaccia 1976]
    - †P. frugilegus Mayr, Mourer-Chauviré & Weidig 2004
    - †P. mcgrewi Brodkorb 1970
    - †P. perneri Mayr, Mourer-Chauviré & Weidig 2004
- Todidae – todies
  - †Palaeotodus Olson 1976 (Late Eocene of France – Early Oligocene of WC Europe and Wyoming)
    - †P. emryi Olson 1976
    - †P. escampsiensis Mourer-Chauviré 1985
    - †P. itardiensis Mourer-Chauviré 1985
- Motmotidae – motmots
  - Placement unresolved
    - Momotidae gen. et sp. indet. (Late Miocene)
- Coraciidae
  - †Miocoracias chenevali Mourer-Chauviré, Peyrouse & Hugueney 2013
  - Extant genera present in the fossil record
    - Eurystomus
      - †E. beremedensis Kessler 2010

=== Bucerotiformes ===
- †Messelirrisoridae
  - †Messelirrisor Mayr 1998 (middle Eocene)
    - †M. halcyorostris Mayr 1998
    - †M. parvus Mayr 1998
    - †M. grandis Mayr 2000
- Phoeniculidae (woodhoopoes)
  - †Phirriculus pinicola Mlíkovský & Göhlich 2000
- Bucerotidae – hornbills
  - †Euroceros bulgaricus Boev & Kovachev 2007 (Late Miocene of Hadzhidimovo, Bulgaria)
  - Extant genera present in the fossil record
    - Bucorvus
      - †B. brailloni Brunet 1971

=== Trogoniformes ===
- Trogonidae – trogons
  - †Foshanornis songi Zhao et al. 2015
  - †Septentrogon madseni Kristoffersen 2002 (Fur Late Paleocene/Early Eocene of Ejerslev, Denmark)
  - †Paratrogon gallicus (Milne-Edwards 1871) Lambrecht 1933 [Trogon gallicus Milne-Edwards 1871] (Early Miocene of France)
  - †Primotrogon Mayr 1999 [Masillatrogon Mayr 2009] (middle Eocene of Messel, Germany? - Early Oligocene of France)
    - †P. wintersteini Mayr 1999
    - †P. pumilio Mayr 2005 [Masillatrogon pumilio (Mayr 2005) Mayr 2009]
  - Placement unresolved
    - Trogonidae gen. et sp. indet. 1 (NW Europe)
    - Trogonidae gen. et sp. indet. 2 (NW Europe)

=== Piciformes ===
- Placement unresolved
  - Piciformes gen. et sp. indet. IRScNB Av 65 (Early Oligocene)
  - Rupelramphastoides (Early Oligocene) – ramphastid?
  - Piciformes gen. et sp. indet. SMF Av 429 (Late Oligocene)
  - Capitonides (Early – Middle Miocene) – ramphastid? "capitonid" (Lybiidae, Megalaimidae)? own family Capitonididae?
  - Pici gen. et sp. indet. (Middle Miocene) – "capitonid" (Lybiidae, Megalaimidae?)
- Miopiconidae
  - Miopico
- Lybiidae – African barbets
  - Lybiidae gen. et sp. indet. (Late Miocene) – extant genus Pogoniulus?
- Galbulidae
  - Extant genera present in the fossil record
    - Galbula hylochoreutes (Middle Miocene of La Venta, Colombia)
- Picavidae
  - Picavus
- Picidae – woodpeckers
  - Palaeopicus (Late Oligocene)
  - Palaeonerpes (Early Pliocene)
  - Pliopicus (Early Pliocene)
  - Placement unresolved
    - Picidae gen. et sp. indet. (Middle Miocene)
    - Picidae gen. et sp. indet. (Late Miocene)
    - cf. Colaptes DMNH 1262 (Early Pliocene of Ainsworth, US)
  - Extant genera present in the fossil record
    - Campephilus (Late Pleistocene – Recent)
    - Colaptes
    - Dendrocopos
    - Additional prehistoric subspecies of extant species
      - Melanerpes superciliaris ssp. (Little Exuma, Bahamas)
      - Melanerpes superciliaris ssp. (New Providence, Bahamas)

=== Passeriformes ===
- Placement unresolved
  - Passeriformes gen. et spp. indet. (Early Eocene) – several species, oscine?
  - Resoviaornis (Early Oligocene)
  - Wieslochia (Early Oligocene)
  - Passeriformes gen. et spp. indet. (Late Oligocene) – several suboscine and oscine species
  - Certhiops (Early Miocene of Germany) – basal Certhioidea
  - Passeriformes gen. et sp. indet. (Early/Middle Miocene) – suboscine?
  - Passeriformes gen. et spp. indet. (Early/Middle Miocene) – several species, oscine?
  - Passeriformes gen. et spp. indet. (Middle Miocene) – several species, basal?
  - Passeriformes gen. et spp. indet. (Middle Miocene) – several species, oscine?
  - Passeriformes gen. et spp. indet. (Late Miocene) – Sylvioidea
  - "Palaeostruthus" eurius (Pliocene)
- Eurylaimidae – broadbills
  - Placement unresolved
    - Eurylaimidae gen. et sp. indet. (Early Miocene)
- Palaeoscinidae
  - Palaeoscinis (Late Miocene)
- Furnariidae – ovenbirds
  - †Pseudoseisuropsis
    - †P. nehuen (Early Pleistocene of Argentina)
    - †P. cuelloi (Late Pleistocene of Uruguay)
    - †P. wintu (Early Pleistocene of Argentina)
  - Prehistoric species of extant genera
    - Pseudoseisura cursor (Ensenada Early/Middle Pleistocene of Anchorena, Argentina)
    - Cinclodes major (Middle Pleistocene of Buenos Aires Province, Argentina)
- Menuridae – lyretails
  - Extant genera present in the fossil record
    - Menura (Early Miocene – Recent)
- Meliphagidae – honeyeaters
  - Placement unresolved
    - Meliphagidae gen. et spp. indet. (Middle/Late Miocene – Pliocene of Riversleigh, Australia) – at least 7 spp., some may be from extant genera
- Orthonychidae – logrunners
  - Extant genera present in the fossil record
    - Orthonyx (Middle/Late Miocene – Recent)
- Oriolidae – Old World orioles
  - Longmornis (Early Miocene of Riversleigh, Australia)
- Artamidae – woodswallows, butcherbirds, currawongs and Australian magpie
  - Placement unresolved
    - Artamidae gen. et sp. indet. (Early/Middle Miocene) – cracticine
- Corvidae – crows, ravens, jays and magpies
  - Miocorvus (Middle Miocene)
  - Miopica (Middle Miocene)
  - Miocitta (Late Miocene)
  - Protocitta (Early Pleistocene)
  - Henocitta (Middle Pleistocene)
  - Extant genera present in the fossil record
    - Corvus (Late Miocene — Recent)
    - Pica (Late Pliocene/Early Pleistocene – Recent)
    - Pyrrhocorax
  - Placement unresolved
    - Corvidae gen. et sp. indet. (Early Pliocene)
    - Corvidae gen. et sp. indet. (Early/Middle Pleistocene) – probably belongs in extant genus
- Laniidae – shrikes
  - Extant genera present in the fossil record
    - Lanius (Early Miocene – Recent)
- Regulidae – kinglets
  - Extant genera present in the fossil record
    - Regulus (Late Pliocene – Recent)
- Hirundinidae – swallows and martins
  - Placement unresolved
    - Hirundinidae gen. et spp. indet. (Early Pliocene of Langebaanweg, South Africa) – 2 species
- Megaluridae – grass-warblers and allies
  - Extant genera present in the fossil record
    - ?Locustella (Late Miocene – Recent)
- Acrocephalidae – marsh- and tree-warblers
  - Extant genera present in the fossil record
    - ?Acrocephalus (Late Miocene – Recent)
- Muscicapidae – Old World flycatchers and chats
  - Extant genera present in the fossil record
    - Luscinia (Late Miocene – Recent)
- Turdidae – thrushes
  - Extant genera present in the fossil record
    - ?Turdus (Middle? Miocene – Recent)
- Alaudidae – larks
  - Eremarida (Late Miocene of Hrabarsko, Bulgaria)
- Motacillidae – wagtails
  - Extant genera present in the fossil record
    - Motacilla
- Fringillidae – finches
  - Extant genera present in the fossil record
    - Loxia (Late Pliocene – Recent)
  - Additional prehistoric species of extant genera
    - Coccothraustes simeonovi (Late Pliocene of Varshets, Bulgaria)
    - Coccothraustes balcanicus
- Icteridae – grackles and New World orioles
  - Pandanaris (Pleistocene)
  - Pyelorhamphus (Pleistocene)
  - Extant genera present in the fossil record
    - Euphagus (Late Pleistocene – Recent)
- Cardinalidae – cardinals
  - Placement unresolved
    - Passerina sp. (Early Pliocene of Yepómera, Mexico)
- Emberizidae – buntings and New World sparrows
  - Pampaemberiza (Middle Pleistocene of Necochea, Argentina)
  - Extant genera present in the fossil record
    - Ammodramus (Late Miocene – Recent) – including Palaeostruthus
  - Additional prehistoric species of extant genera
    - Pipilo angelensis (Pleistocene of Rancho La Brea, US)

== Avialans incertae sedis ==
These fossil taxa cannot be assigned to any major group with reasonable certainty. The "protobirds" above are of some indeterminate basal position in the entire avialan (and paravian) radiation, but known from such diagnostic material that their relationships at the family level are known. In contrast, the taxa here have a hypodigm that is usually just sufficient for giving them a valid scientific name, but not for phylogenetic purposes beyond classing them as pygostylians or more modern birds. Some, however, are known from such fragmentary remains that the possibility that they are non-avian "reptiles" such as dinosaurs cannot be ruled out at present.

- †"Ichthyornis" minusculus Nesov 1990 (Bissekty Late Cretaceous of Kyzyl Kum, Uzbekistan) – enantiornithine?
- †Qinornis paleocenica Xue 1995 (Early/Middle Paleocene) – enantiornithine? neornithine?

== See also ==
- Bird ichnology
- Dominant group (extinction)
- Feathered dinosaurs
- List of recently extinct birds
- Late Quaternary prehistoric birds
- List of paleognaths
- List of Galliformes
- List of Columbidae species
- Flightless birds
- Origin of birds
- Prehistoric life
