= Pseudodontornis =

Pseudodontornis Temporal range: Late Paleocene - Early Eocene, 58.7–48.6 Ma

Scientific classification
- Kingdom: Animalia
- Phylum: Chordata
- Class: Aves
- Order: †Odontopterygiformes
- Family: †Pelagornithidae
- Genus: †Pseudodontornis; Lambrecht, 1930

Species
- P. longidentata Harrison & C.A.Walker, 1976 (disputed); P. longirostris (Spulski, 1910) (type species); P. stirtoni Howard & Warter, 1969 (disputed); P. tenuirostris Harrison, 1985 (disputed); P. tshulensis (Aver'janov, Panteleev, Potapova & Nesov, 1991) (disputed) and see text

Synonyms
- Neodontornis Harrison & C.A.Walker, 1976 (but see text)

Extinct genus of birds

Pseudodontornis is a rather disputed genus of the prehistoric pseudotooth birds. The pseudotooth birds or pelagornithids were probably rather close relatives of either pelicans and storks, or of waterfowl, and are here placed in the order Odontopterygiformes to account for this uncertainty. Up to five species are commonly recognized in this genus.

But actually the genus Pseudodontornis is barely more than a nomen nudum. And though it served as the namesake for a popular alternate common name of the pseudotooth birds – "pseudodontorns" or "pseudodontornids" – that was extensively used in the 20th century, current authors prefer "pelagornithids" because this is less fraught with taxonomic dispute. Pelagornis, the type genus of the family Pelagornithidae, was long unrecognized as a pseudotooth bird as it was known mainly from arm bones. Thus, though the Pelagornithidae were long recognized as very distinct, they were allied with the cormorant and gannet in suborder Sulae (or superfamily Sulides in suborder Pelecanae) before it was recognized that they are actually pseudotooth birds. The presumed family "Pseudodontornithidae", deemed invalid nowadays, had been recognized as pseudotooth birds all along, as they were established based on skull fossils preserving parts of the "toothed" beak.

One of the species typically placed here – though in fact one that is rather unlikely to actually belong in Pseudodontornis – is the only smallish pseudotooth bird species known with certainty from the Neogene as of 2009. However, the enigmatic Tympanonesiotes was of similar size and may also be of Neogene age.

== Type species and description ==
The type species P. longirostris (initially placed in Odontopteryx) is known from an incomplete but quite well preserved fossil skull of unknown age and origin; it was bought from a merchant who had acquired it from a sailor returning from Brazil, but the specimen is widely presumed to be actually from the North Sea region. It is tentatively assigned an Eocene age, if only due to the fact that suitable lagerstätten of different age were not known when the specimen was discovered. If not from Europe however, its age is truly undeterminable. A pseudotooth bird's lower right dentary piece (specimen YPM 4617) from near Charleston, South Carolina (United States) – apparently dredged up from near the source of the Stono River – was provisionally assigned to P. longirostris as it closely matches the holotype in size and appearance. At first the South Carolina fossil was believed to be from the Early Miocene Hawthorne Formation, but in fact no Hawthorne Formation sediments were known in the Charleston region when the fossil was found. Consequently, modern authors consider a Chattian (Late Oligocene) age more likely and suggest the fossil came from the Cooper or Chandler Bridge Formation. Some fossil remains from the Middle Miocene Bahía Inglesa Formation of Chile were prematurely affiliated with P. longirostris in error; they are, if anything, of Pelagornis.

The holotype skull seems to have been lost, but judging from the description the genus might actually be a junior synonym of the (probably) Late Oligocene Palaeochenoides, or either or both might properly belong in the otherwise Miocene Pelagornis. Like in that latter genus, between each two of P. longirostris' large "teeth" was a single smaller one; whether there were even smaller points in addition as in Pelagornis' allopatric contemporary Osteodontornis cannot be ascertained. Its paroccipital process is not as markedly elongated back- and downwards as in the Ypresian (Early Eocene) Dasornis and Odontopteryx and seems to be in a more apomorphic condition, which would agree with a late Paleogene, possibly even (like Pelagornis) Neogene age for the holotype. Its quadrate bone had a broad main shaft like in Odontopteryx which like in that genus bore a broad lateral ridge that was not, however, curved, but straight as in Osteodontornis; like in that genus, the forward center of the quadrate's ventral articulation ridge extended upwards. Unlike in either Odontopteryx or Osteodontornis, the quadrate of P. longirostris had a socket for the quadratojugal that was displaced dorsally. However its relationships may be, there can be no doubt that the mysterious skull was from one of the large pelagornithids, and the living bird must have had a wingspan of more than 5, quite possibly as much as 6 m (16–20 ft).

== Other species ==
It is not entirely resolved whether the other four Pseudodontornis are indeed valid and distinct species. P. tenuirostris was proposed for a Late Paleocene-Early Eocene pseudotooth bird from Herne Bay, Kent (England), and P. tshulensis is an approximately contemporary species from Zhylga (Kazakhstan) that is sometimes placed in Odontopteryx. P. longidentata was described from the Ypresian London Clay of the Isle of Sheppey (England); it is probably a junior synonym of Macrodontopteryx oweni (or Odontopteryx oweni) or – more likely due to its size – Dasornis emuinus.

"P." stirtoni is a supposed Neogene member of this lineage. It was described from a crushed skull and femur found on Motunau Beach on the eastern coast of the South Island, New Zealand. It, too, lacks crucial data; though there are suggestions that it is from the Greta Siltstone Formation or elsewhere in the Late Pliocene (Waitotaran) and dates back only 3.5 Ma (million years ago) – which would make it one of the last of the pseudotooth birds –, its age can only be constrained to some time during the Miocene or Pliocene, i.e. a period of 20 million years. The Motunau Beach skull resembles the roughly contemporary Osteodontornis of the North Pacific in having a jugal arch that is short and very stout behind the orbital process of the prefrontal bone – apparently unlike in P. longirostris. But the fossil femur measures 12.95 cm (5.10 in) – only half as large as that of Osteodontornis (or P. longirostris, for that matter). "P." stirtoni was thus marginally larger than the Australian pelican (Pelecanus conspicillatus) of our time, or about the size of the small Paleogene pseudotooth bird Odontopteryx toliapica. Also of this species might be a proximal right radius and a distal right humerus – McKee collection A080 183 and A111 182, respectively – from the Waipipian (around 3 Ma) Tangahoe Mudstone Formation at Hawera on New Zealand's North Island. They are a fairly good match in size for the "P." stirtoni holotype. Though the proposed separation of this species in a monotypic genus Neodontornis has been generally rejected, given the fossils' distinctness from P. longirostris in age, features, occurrence and size, it may just as well be appropriate.

Pseudotooth bird fossils from Early to Middle Miocene Astoria and perhaps also Nye Formations of Oregon have also been assigned to Pseudodontornis. This is due to a writer's error, however, and should be "pseudodontornids". These remains are probably referrable to Osteodontornis.

== See also ==
- Manu (bird)
