= 1976 in paleontology =

Paleontology or palaeontology is the study of prehistoric life forms on Earth through the examination of plant and animal fossils. This includes the study of body fossils, tracks (ichnites), burrows, cast-off parts, fossilised feces (coprolites), palynomorphs and chemical residues. Because humans have encountered fossils for millennia, paleontology has a long history both before and after becoming formalized as a science. This article records significant discoveries and events related to paleontology that occurred or were published in the year 1976.

== Flora ==
=== Cycads ===
Name	Novelty	Status	Authors	Age	Type locality	Location	Notes	Images
Eostangeria	Gen et Sp nov	valid	Barthel	Middle-Late Eocene	Geisel valley	Germany	An eostangerioid zamiaceous cycad.	

== Arthropods ==
=== Newly named crustaceans ===
Name	Novelty	Status	Authors	Age	Type locality	Location	Notes	Images
Chilenophoberus	Gen. et. sp. nov.	Valid	Chong & Förster	Late Jurassic (Oxfordian)	Cordillera de Domeyko	Chile	A stenochirid, type species is C. atacamensis	

== Dinosaurs ==
Data courtesy of George Olshevsky's dinosaur genera list.

=== Newly named dinosaurs ===
Name	Status	Author	Age	Unit	Location	Notes	Image
Alioramus	Valid taxon	Sergei Kurzanov	Maastrichtian	Nemegt Formation	Mongolia	A Tyrannosaur with five knobs on the snout.	Alioramus
Itemirus	Valid taxon	Sergei Kurzanov	Turonian	Bissekty Formation	Uzbekistan	A close relative of Velociraptor.	
Marshosaurus	Valid taxon	J. H. Madsen	Kimmeridgian	Morrison Formation	USA (Colorado and Utah)	A North American Megalosaur Close Relative of the Piatnitzkysaurus.	Marshosaurus
Ouranosaurus	Valid taxon	Philippe Taquet	Aptian-Albian	Elrhaz Formation Koum Formation	Niger Cameroon	A sail-backed Iguanodont	Ouranosaurus
Zigongosaurus	Disputed.	Hou, Zhao, & Chao	Middle to Late Jurassic	Shaximiao Formation	China	Possible junior synonym of Mamenchisaurus.	

=== Newly named birds ===
Name	Novelty	Status	Author	Age	Unit	Location	Notes	Image
Aegialornis broweri	Sp. nov.	Valid	Charles T. Collins	Eocene or Oligocene	Phosphorites du Quercy, MP 16-28; Geiseltal	France; DDR	An Apodiformes, Aegialornithidae Lydekker, 1891, transferred to the new genus Mesogiornis Mlíkovský, 2002. by Mlíkovský, 2002.	
Aegialornis wetmorei	Sp. nov.	Valid	Charles T. Collins	Eocene or Oligocene	Phosphorites du Quercy, MP 16-28	France	An Apodiformes, Aegialornithidae Lydekker, 1891, transferred to the new genus Mesogiornis Mlíkovský, 2002. by Mlíkovský, 2002., it is the type species of the new genus.	
Alexornis antecedens	Gen. nov. et Sp. nov.	Valid	Pierce Brodkorb	Late Cretaceous	Campanian	Mexico	An Enantiornithes Walker, 1981, Alexornithiformes Brodkorb, 1976, Alexornithidae Brodkorb, 1976.	
Anas soporata	Sp. nov.	Valid	Evgeny N. Kurochkin	Miocene-Pliocene	Chirgiz-Nur Formation	Mongolia	An Anatidae, transferred to the genus Dendrocygna by Jíří Mlíkovský & Petr Švec, 1986.	
Anser liskunae	Sp. nov.	Valid	Evgeny N. Kurochkin	Middle Pliocene	Zavhan	Mongolia	An Anatidae.	
Apteribis glenos	Gen. nov. et Sp. nov.	Valid	Storrs L. Olson Alexander Wetmore	Holocene	25,000 Ybp	USA (Hawaii)	A Threskiornithidae, this is the type species of the new genus.	
Aythya spatiosa	Sp. nov.	Valid	Evgeny N. Kurochkin	Early Pliocene	Hyargas Nuur Formation	Mongolia	An Anatidae.	
Apus wetmorei	Sp. nov.	Valid	Peter Ballmann	Early Pliocene	Gargano, MN 14-15	Italy	An Apodidae.	
Butorides validipes	Sp. nov.	Valid	Kenneth E. Campbell, Jr.	Early Pleistocene	Late Blancan	USA (Florida)	An Ardeidae.	
Columba omnisanctorum	Sp. nov.	Valid	Peter Ballmann	Early Pliocene	Gargano, ppMN 14-15	Italy	A Columbidae.	
Eobucco brodkorbi	Gen. nov. et Sp. nov.	Valid	Alan Feduccia Larry D. Martin	Middle Eocene	Bridger Formation	USA (Wyoming)	Described as a Piciformes, Primobucconidae Feduccia et Martin, 1976, now placed in the Coliiformes, Sandcileidae Houde et Olson, 1992, it is the type species of the new genus.	
Gigantibis incognita	Gen. nov. et Sp. nov.	Valid	Colin J. O. Harrison Cyril A. Walker	Late Eocene	MP 17	UK	Described as a Threskiornithidae, placed in Aves Incertae Sedis by Olson, 1981, this is the type species of the new genus.	
Heterochen vicinus	Sp. nov.	Valid	Evgeny N. Kurochkin	Late Miocene	Hyargas Nuur Formation	Mongolia	An Anatidae, transferred to the genus Anser by Jíří Mlíkovský & Petr Švec, 1986, and made the type species of his new genus Heteroanser by Nikita V. Zelenkov, 2012.	
Howardia eous	Gen. nov. et Sp. nov.	Valid	Colin J. O. Harrison Cyril A. Walker	Late Eocene	MP 17	UK	An Anatidae, this is the type species of this new genus but it is preoccupied by Howardia Berlese et Leonardi, 1896. (Insecta: Hemiptera)so transferred to and becoming the type species of the new genus Palaeopapia Harrison et Walker, 1979 by Colin J. O. Harrison & Cyril A. Walker in 1979.	
Jacana farrandi	Sp. nov.	Valid	Storrs L. Olson	Middle Pliocene	Alachua Formatie, Early Hemphillian	USA (Florida)	A Jacanidae.	
Macrodontopteryx oweni	Gen. nov et Sp. nov.	Valid	Colin J. O. Harrison Cyril A. Walker	Early Eocene	Ypresian, MP 8-9	UK	A Pelagornithidae Fürbringer, 1888, this is the type species of the new genus.	
Milvago alexandri	Sp. nov.	Valid	Storrs L. Olson	Late Pleistocene	Cave deposits	Haiti	A Falconidae.	
Nyctanassa kobdoena	Sp. nov.	Valid	Evgeny N. Kurochkin	Late Miocene		Mongolia	An Ardeidae.	
Ogygoptynx wetmorei	Gen. nov et Sp. nov.	Valid	Patricia Vickers Rich David J. Bohaska	Middle Paleocene	Tiffanian	USA (Colorado)	A Strigiformes, Ogygoptyngidae Rich et Bohaska, 1981., this is the type species and type genus of the new genus and the new family.	
Oreopholus orcesi	Sp. nov.	Valid	Kenneth E. Campbell, Jr.	Pleistocene	La Carolina	Ecuador	A Charadriidae.	
Palaeotodus emryi	Gen. nov. et Sp. nov.	Valid	Storrs L. Olson	Oligocene	Brule Formation	USA (Wyoming)	A Todidae, this is the type species of the new genus.	
Pandion homalopteron	Sp. nov.	Valid	Stuart L. Warter	Middle Miocene	Barstovian	USA (California)	A Pandionidae.	
Pelecanus aethiopicus	Sp. nov.	Valid	Colin J. O. Harrison Cyril A. Walker	Early Middle Pleistocene	Olduvai Series	Tanzania	A Pelecanidae.	
Petropluvialis simplex	Gen. nov. et Sp. nov.	Valid	Colin J. O. Harrison Cyril A. Walker	Late Eocene	MP 17	UK	Described in the Burhinidae, placed in Aves Incertae Sedis by Mlíkovský 2002, according to Mayr et Smith, 2001 closely related to Palaeopapia eous (Harrison et Walker, 1976) and possibly synonymous with this species so they place it in the Anseriformes, this is the type species of the new genus.	
Phalacrocorax reliquus	Sp. nov.	Valid	Evgeny N. Kurochkin	Pliocene		Mongolia	A Phalacrocoracidae.	
Phoenicopterus aethiopicus	Sp. nov.	Valid	Collin J. O. Harrison Cyril A. Walker	Early Miocene	Rusinga Island Maboko Island	Kenya	A Phoenicopteridae, transferred to the genus Leakeyornis Vickers-Rich & Walker, 1983 by Patricia Vickers Rich & Cyril A. Walker, it is the type species of the new genus.	
Piscator tenuirostris	Gen. nov. et Sp. nov.	Valid	Colin J. O. Harrison Cyril A. Walker	Late Eocene	MP 17	UK	Described in the Phalacrocoracidae, placed in Aves Incertae Sedis by Mlíkovský 2002, this is the type species of the new genus.	
Podilymbus wetmorei	Sp. nov.	Valid	Robert W. Storer	Late Pleistocene	Rancholabrean	USA (Florida)	A Podicipedidae.	
Praemancalla wetmorei	Sp. nov.	Valid	Hildegarde Howard	Late Miocene	Monterey Formatie	USA (California)	An Alcidae, transferred to the genus Miomancalla N. A. Smith, 2011 by N. Adam Smith, 2011.	
Primobucco olsoni	Sp. nov.	Valid	Alan Feduccia Larry D. Martin	Early Eocene; Middle Eocene	Green River Formation	UK; USA (Wyoming)	Described as a Piciformes, Primobucconidae Feduccia et Martin, 1976, made the type species of the new genus Cyrilavis Martin, 2010 and placed in the stem Psittaciformes, Halcyornithidae Harrison et Walker, 1972.	
Pseudodontornis longidentata	Sp. nov.	Valid	Colin J. O. Harrison Cyril A. Walker	Early Eocene	Ypresian, MP 8-9	UK	A Pelagornithidae Fürbringer, 1888.	
Strix? perpasta	Sp. nov.	Valid	Peter Ballmann	Early Pliocene	Gargano, MN 14-15	Italy	A Strigidae, transferred to the genus Bubo by Mlíkovský 1998.	
Tenuicrus magnum	Gen. nov. et Sp. nov.	Valid	Colin J. O. Harrison Cyril A. Walker	Late Eocene	MP 17	UK	A Phoenicopteriformes, Juncitarcidae, this is the type of this new genus but it is preoccupied by Tenuicrus Womersley, 1940. (Arachnida: Acarina)so transferred to and becoming the type species of the new genus Kashinia Harrison et Walker, 1979 by Colin J. O. Harrison & Cyril A. Walker in 1979.	
Tetrao macropus	Sp. nov.	Valid	Dénes Jánossy	Late Pliocene	MN 18	Hungary	A Phasianidae.	
Thambetochen chauliodous	Gen. nov. et Sp. nov.	Valid	Storrs L. Olson Alexander Wetmore	Holocene	Molokai, Oahu, Maui	USA (Hawaii)	The first described moa-nalo, an Anatidae.	
Uintornis marionae	Sp. nov.	Valid	Alan Feduccia Larry D. Martin	Middle Eocene	Bridger Formation	USA (Wyoming)	Described in the Piciformes, Primobucconidae Feduccia & Martin, 1976, transferred to the Coliiformes, Sandcoleidae Houde et Olson, 1992 by Peter W. Houde & Storrs L. Olson, 1992.	
Villetus grandis	Gen. nov. et Sp. nov.	Valid	Colin J. O. Harrison Cyril A. Walker	Late Eocene	MP 14-16	UK	Described in the Scolopacidae, placed in Aves Incertae Sedis by Mlíkovský 2002, this is the type species of the new genus.	
Villetus waltoni	Sp. nov.	Valid	Colin J. O. Harrison Cyril A. Walker	Late Eocene	MP 14-16	UK	Described in the Scolopacidae, placed in Aves Incertae Sedis by Mlíkovský 2002.	

== Plesiosaurs ==
=== New taxa ===
Name	Status	Authors	Age	Location	Notes
Georgia	Valid	Otschev	Late Cretaceous	Russia	preoccupied by a genus of mollusk, renamed to Georgiasaurus in 1977

== Mammals ==
=== New taxa ===
Name	Status	Authors	Age	Location	Notes
Fiandraia	Valid	Roselli	Oligocene-Early Miocene	Uruguay	

== Other Animals ==
Name	Status	Author	Age	Unit	Location	Notes	Image
Vendomia menneri	species moved to Dickinsonia by Ivantsov in 2007	Keller	Ediacaran		Russia		
