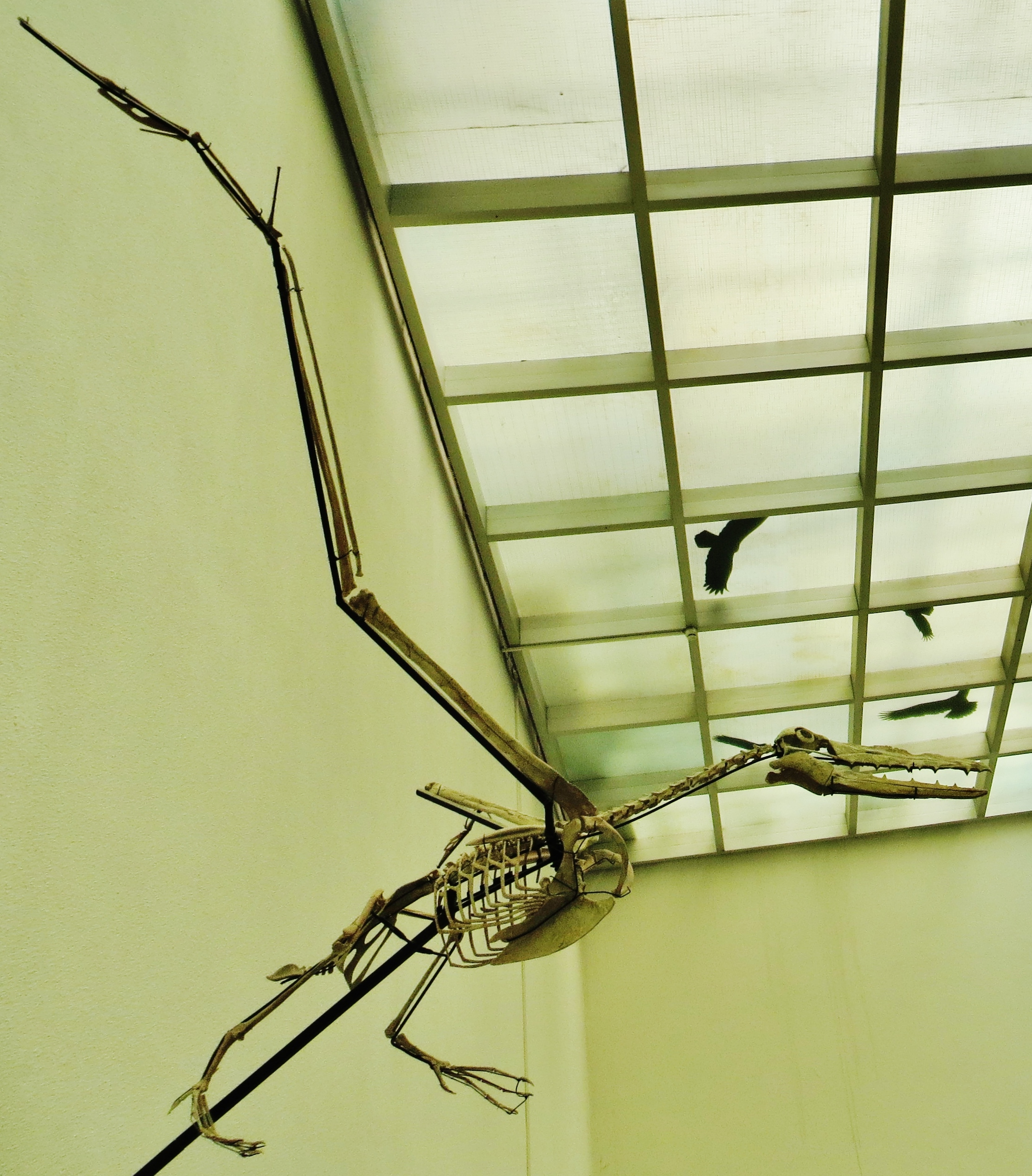
- Reconstructed skeleton

Scientific classification
- Kingdom: Animalia
- Phylum: Chordata
- Class: Aves
- Order: †Odontopterygiformes
- Family: †Pelagornithidae
- Genus: †Dasornis; Owen, 1870

Type species
- †Dasornis emuinus Bowerbank, 1854

Species
- †D. emuinus (1854) †D. toliapica (1873) †D. abdoun (2010)

Synonyms
- Numerous, see text

= Dasornis =

Dasornis Temporal range: Early Eocene (but see text) 51–50 Ma

Extinct genus of birds

Dasornis is a genus of prehistoric pseudotooth birds. These were probably close relatives of either pelicans and storks or waterfowl; they are placed in the order Odontopterygiformes to account for this uncertainty.

Almost all known material of this bird is from some 50 million years ago (Ma) and has been recovered from the Ypresian (Early Eocene) London Clay of the Isle of Sheppey (England). The exception are a few approximately 45 Ma-old remains from the Lutetian (Middle Eocene, MP11-13) of Etterbeek (Belgium) that are only tentatively included here, and some even more conjectural remains from outside Europe (see below).

== Description ==
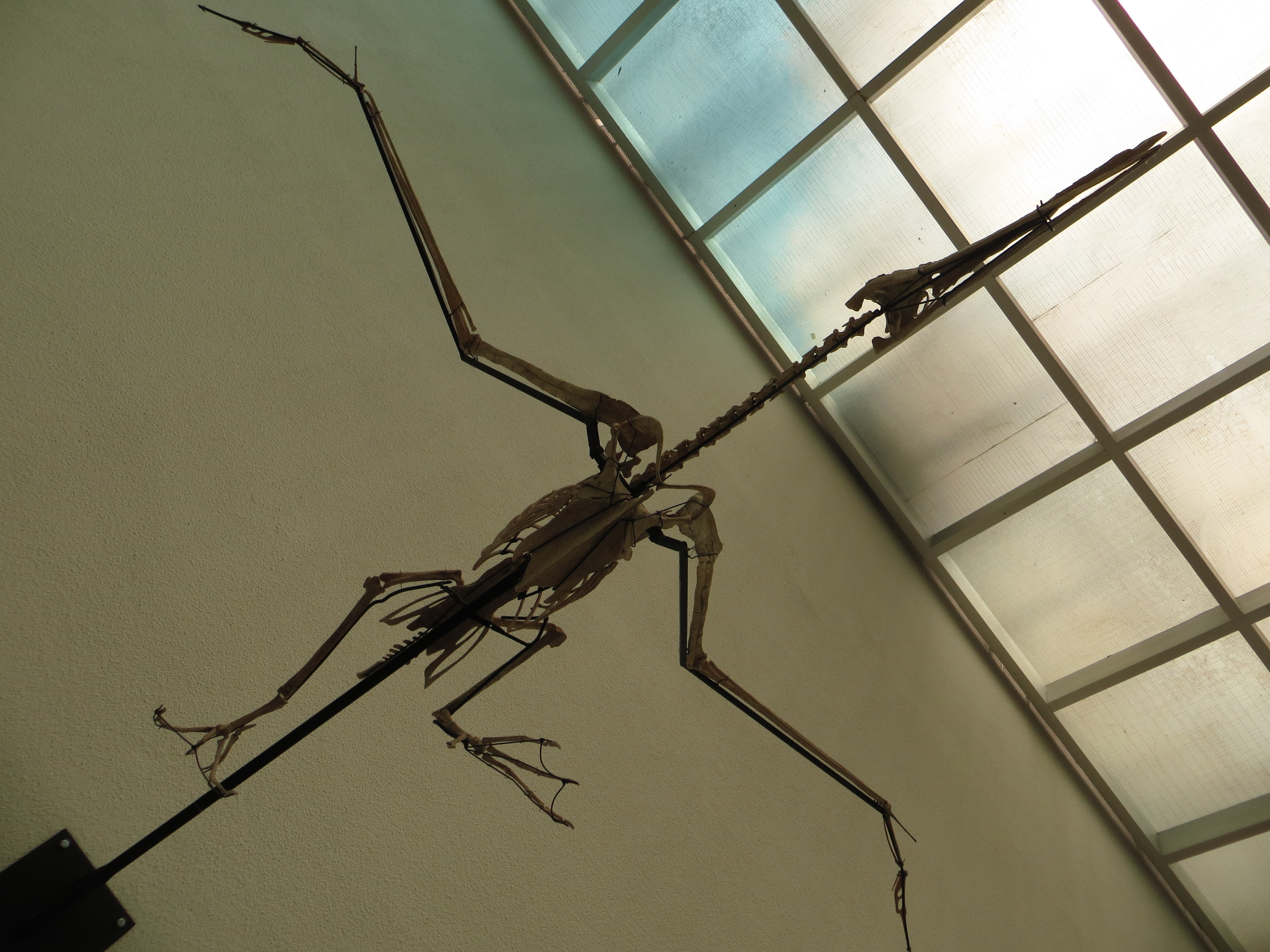
Skeleton from below

Like those of its relatives, the thin-walled bones of Dasornis broke easily and thus very few fossils – though still far more than of the average pseudotooth bird genus – are in decent condition. Among these is a superbly preserved partial skull that has been of crucial importance in sorting out the convoluted synonymy of this genus. Apart from that and another not quite as well-preserved partial skull, however, a number of beak and cranium pieces as well as a few broken remains of wing and tarsometatarsus bones make up the known remains of Dasornis. The most tell-tale characteristic of the present genus are the combination of Paleogene age and huge size. But given the fragmented state of these, it is not at all clear whether the genus was restricted to the North Atlantic (and perhaps the adjacent Paratethys) or occurred also in the Pacific and in the Southern Hemisphere, where fossils of a similar size were found (see below).

This genus belongs to the group of huge pseudotooth birds, with wingspans in excess of 5 m (16 ft), and probably as much as 6 m (20 ft). The complete head and bill probably measured almost 45 cm (1.48 ft) in life, the eye socket had a diameter of 55 millimetres (2.2 in) and the humerus at its distal end was about 35 millimetres (1.4 in) wide. The well-preserved skull fossil shows deep grooves along the underside of the upper bill, with pits to accommodate the lower bill's "teeth". Thus, only the upper "teeth" were visible when the bird closed its bill. Dasornis resembles the much smaller Odontopteryx in having a jugal arch that is mid-sized, tapering and stout behind the orbital process of the prefrontal bone, unlike in the large Neogene Osteodontornis. Also, its paroccipital process is much elongated back- and downwards, again like in Odontopteryx but unlike in Pseudodontornis longirostris. Further traits in which Dasornis agreed with Odontopteryx – and differed from Pelagornis (a contemporary of Osteodontornis) are a deep and long handward-pointing pneumatic foramen in the fossa pneumotricipitalis of the humerus, a latissimus dorsi muscle attachment site on the humerus that consists of two distinct segments instead of a single long, and a large knob that extends along the ulna where the ligamentum collaterale ventrale attached. As the traits as found in Odontopteryx and Dasornis are probably plesiomorphic, they cannot be used to argue for a closer relationship between the two Paleogene genera than either had with Osteodontornis and/or Pelagornis.

== Systematics and taxonomy ==
Only a single species, Dasornis emuinus, is accepted today. However, it has a very convoluted synonymy, with its fossil remains assigned to no less than six genera (of which two were invalid junior homonyms) and divided between at least four species – excluding spelling errors and invalid "corrections" – that were variously moved between these genera for almost 150 years:

1854-1890: "Lithornis" emuinus, "Megalornis" of Seeley, Dasornis and Argillornis
The first fossil of D. emuinus, a piece of right humerus shaft, was found in the Ypresian (Early Eocene) London Clay of the Isle of Sheppey (England). It was misidentified as a tibiotarsus of the paleognath Lithornis and described as L. emuinus by James Scott Bowerbank in 1854. Harry Govier Seeley recognized this error in 1866 and established the genus Megalornis, though he misspelled the specific name as emuianus. However, the genus name he chose had already been used for some of the great herons (Ardea). Richard Owen established the genera Dasornis (in 1870) and Argillornis (in 1878) for, respectively, a broken skull and two humerus ends that were found in the same deposits. Some authors claim he had already erected the former genus in 1869, but in that year he only used the names informally in his brief initial report on the newly discovered skull. Misled by the skull's large size and perhaps overly eager to be the first to describe the remains of a "European moa" (Owen was the foremost authority on these New Zealand endemics at that time), he placed Dasornis in the Dinornithidae. Argillornis, on the other hand, was recognized early on as some sort of aquatic bird, but its immense size puzzled paleontologists to no little extent.

1891-1985: spelling errors, "Neptuniavis" and "completely unrealistic" taxonomy
Subsequent authors, noting that it was quite obviously not a paleognath ratite, placed Dasornis in the Gastornithidae. Richard Lydekker in 1891 proposed to rename Owen's D. londinensis to D. londiniensis, and later that year wanted to change Dasornis to Dasyornis. But the altered specific name was not in accordance with the rules of zoological nomenclature, and neither was the genus name he chose – and which, moreover, had already been used earlier by Nicholas Aylward Vigors and Thomas Horsfield for the bristlebirds. In 1921, Kálmán Lambrecht "corrected" Seeley's Megalornis emuianus to emuinus and in 1933 he misspelled Owen's A. longipennis as longipes. Pierce Brodkorb resolved the Megalornis homonymy in 1963 by merging "M." emuinus with A. longipennis, combining the older specific name emuinus and the then-valid genus name Argillornis. However, he rather inexplicably allied Argillornis with the enigmatic Mesozoic Elopteryx nopcsai – a sort of "wastebin taxon" for Late Cretaceous maniraptoran theropod remains from Romania that might not even be of birds – and the mid-late Eocene Eostega (probably a primitive gannet). In 1976, Colin James Oliver Harrison and Cyril Alexander Walker finally determined all those remains to be of pseudotooth birds. They also proposed that part of the supposed A. longipennis remains was actually from a distinct and slightly smaller genus and species, which they described in a monotypic genus as Macrodontopteryx oweni. In 1977, the same authors erected the genus Neptuniavis for supposed procellariiform tarsometatarsi also found on the Isle of Sheppey; they included two species there. Already however, eminent avian paleontologists such as Storrs L. Olson were voicing their reservation about this proliferation of taxa in no uncertain terms.

2008: just Dasornis emuinus after all
Almost 150 years after the description of "L." emuinus, at the start of the 21st century, a rather well-preserved skull (lacking the beak) was discovered, once again in the Isle of Sheppey London Clay. This specimen – SMNK-PAL 4017 – was studied by Gerald Mayr at the Senckenberg Museum. He determined that all the large seabird bones from the London Clay bones belonged to a single species of pelagornithid. To this, the scientific name Dasornis emuinus applies, a novel combination of the oldest valid genus and species names ever used for these fossils. Indeed, the importance of this specimen can hardly be underestimated, for the holotype skull of Dasornis "londinensis" (which was used to establish the genus Dasornis) is so badly preserved that its status as a pseudotooth bird was debated as recently as 1985. Only the fossils named "Neptuniavis" minor were not of D. emuinus, but of the much smaller contemporary and sympatric pseudotooth bird Odontopteryx toliapica.

"Dasornithidae"
The family Dasornithidae was established by Harrison and Walker in 1976 for Dasornis and its presumed relatives, which are however nowadays included in the former. As current scientists generally try to avoid monotypic taxa unless required by phylogeny, the Dasornithidae never were widely accepted; they are generally considered a junior synonym of the Pelagornithidae instead. And this seems to be quite correct indeed – as noted above, Pelagornis, the type genus of the Pelagornithidae, probably belongs to the same pseudotooth bird lineage as Dasornis and may even be descended from it. Thus, even if several families were recognized in the Odontopterygiformes, Pelagornis and Dasornis would almost certainly remain in the Pelagornithidae.

=== Synonyms ===
The junior synonyms of the genus Dasornis are thus:

- Argillornis Owen, 1878
- "Dasornis" Owen, 1869 (nomen nudum)
- Dasyornis Lydekker, 1891 (non Vigors & Horsfield, 1836: preoccupied)
- Megalornis Seeley, 1866 (non Gray, 1841: preoccupied)
- Neptuniavis Harrison & C.A.Walker, 1977

The junior synonyms of the species D. emuinus are:

- Argillornis emuinus (Bowerbank, 1854)
- Argillornis longipennis Owen, 1878
- Argillornis longipes Lambrecht, 1933 (lapsus)
- "Dasornis londinensis" Owen, 1869 (nomen nudum)
- Dasornis londinensis Owen, 1870
- Dasornis londiniensis Lydekker, 1891 (unjustified emendation)
- Lithornis emuinus Bowerbank, 1854
- Megalornis emuianus Seeley, 1866 (lapsus)
- Megalornis emuinus Lambrecht, 1921 (lapsus)
- Neptuniavis miranda Harrison & C.A.Walker, 1977
- Odontopteryx Owen, 1873

== Other fossils perhaps belonging in Dasornis ==
"Pseudodontornis" longidentata, described from a beak piece and a damaged atlas vertebra of what appears to have been a single individual, is yet another supposed pseudotooth bird species from the Early Eocene London Clay of the Isle of Sheppey. It may well be synonymous with D. emuinus too, or with Macrodontopteryx oweni if that is indeed a distinct species. This also applies to the Lutetian (Middle Eocene) material from Etterbeek (Belgium) which was at first assigned to Argillornis (as was the holotype skull of M. oweni); at least part of the supposed A. longipennis remains – though not its syntype humerus pieces – does seem to be rather small for D. emuinus. Perhaps Gigantornis which is only known from pieces of a sternum found in Middle Eocene rocks in Nigeria also belongs in Dasornis; the sternum of D. emuinus remains unknown, but its size would have been a close match of the Nigerian fossil. Analysis of the unidentified large pelagornithid fossils from the Middle Eocene of Kpogamé-Hahotoé (Togo) which are provisionally termed "Aequornis traversei" might shed light on this issue. The fairly large undescribed remains from the Late Paleocene/Early Eocene of the Ouled Abdoun Basin (Morocco) which have been provisionally termed "Odontopteryx gigas" may in fact be from a small or juvenile Dasornis. The same applies to M. oweni – nonwithstanding that it is sometimes placed in Odontopteryx – considering it was for long included in Argillornis.

Also provisionally assigned to Argillornis were some pelagornithid wing bone remains, specimens LACM 128462 and presumably also LACM 127875 from the Keasey and Pittsburg Bluff Formations of the Eocene/Oligocene boundary of Oregon. Whether this Pacific species was the same as the Atlantic D. emuinus is undetermined, but considering the age difference it is not all too likely and they may well belong to different genera. In that respect, the enigmatic Cyphornis magnus from the same region is most often assigned a Miocene age, but might actually be from around the Eo-Oligocene boundary as initially assumed; it or (if of Miocene age) an ancestor, or perhaps an ancestor of the Miocene genus Osteodontornis, make a more plausible candidate for the Oregon fossils. Lack of sufficient well-preserved remains have prevented more detailed study however. Similar in size and age to the present genus are some pseudotooth bird remains from Antarctica, namely a jaw piece from the Middle/Late Eocene of the La Meseta Formation of Seymour Island near the Drake Passage, and a Middle Eocene piece of a humerus shaft from Mount Discovery on the continent's Pacific side. Separated from the North Atlantic by a wide distance and the equatorial currents, even in the case of the Seymour Island specimen it is doubtful whether they could be referred to Dasornis, because the fossils are simply too fragmentary.

== Bibliography ==
- Bourdon, Estelle (2005): Osteological evidence for sister group relationship between pseudo-toothed birds (Aves: Odontopterygiformes) and waterfowls (Anseriformes). Naturwissenschaften 92(12): 586–591. doi:10.1007/s00114-005-0047-0 (HTML abstract) Electronic supplement (requires subscription)
- Bourdon, Estelle (2006): L'avifaune du Paléogène des phosphates du Maroc et du Togo: diversité, systématique et apports à la connaissance de la diversification des oiseaux modernes (Neornithes) ["Paleogene avifauna of phosphates of Morocco and Togo: diversity, systematics and contributions to the knowledge of the diversification of the Neornithes"]. Doctoral thesis, Muséum national d'histoire naturelle [in French]. HTML abstract
- Brodkorb, Pierce (1963): Catalogue of fossil birds. Part 1 (Archaeopterygiformes through Ardeiformes). Bulletin of the Florida State Museum, Biological Sciences 7(4): 179–293. PDF or JPEG fulltext
- Brodkorb, Pierce (1967): Catalogue of Fossil Birds: Part 3 (Ralliformes, Ichthyornithiformes, Charadriiformes). Bulletin of the Florida State Museum 11(3): 99-220. PDF or JPEG fulltext
- Clouter, Fred [2009a]: Sheppey Fossils – Birds. Retrieved 2009-AUG-05.
- Clouter, Fred [2009b]: Sheppey Fossils – Birds 2. Retrieved 2009-AUG-05.
- Goedert, James L. (1989): Giant Late Eocene Marine Birds (Pelecaniformes: Pelagornithidae) from Northwestern Oregon. J. Paleontol. 63(6): 939–944. Abstract and first page text
- González-Barba, Gerardo; Schwennicke, Tobias; Goedert, James L. & Barnes, Lawrence G. (2002): Earliest Pacific Basin record of the Pelagornithidae (Aves, Pelecaniformes). J. Vertebr. Paleontol. 22(2): 722–725. DOI:10.1671/0272-4634(2002)022[0722:EPBROT]2.0.CO;2 HTML abstract
- International Commission on Zoological Nomenclature (ICZN) (1999): International Code of Zoological Nomenclature (4th ed.). International Trust for Zoological Nomenclature, London. ISBN 0-85301-006-4 HTML fulltext
- Mayr, Gerald (2008): A skull of the giant bony-toothed bird Dasornis (Aves: Pelagornithidae) from the Lower Eocene of the Isle of Sheppey. Palaeontology 51(5): 1107–1116. doi:10.1111/j.1475-4983.2008.00798.x (HTML abstract)
- Mayr, Gerald (2009): Paleogene Fossil Birds. Springer-Verlag, Heidelberg & New York. ISBN 3-540-89627-9
- Mlíkovský, Jirí (2002): Cenozoic Birds of the World, Part 1: Europe. Ninox Press, Prague. ISBN 80-901105-3-8 PDF fulltext
- Mlíkovský, Jirí (2009): Evolution of the Cenozoic marine avifaunas of Europe. Annalen des Naturhistorischen Museums Wien A 111: 357–374 PDF fulltext
- Olson, Storrs L. (1985): The Fossil Record of Birds. In: Farner, D.S; King, J.R. & Parkes, Kenneth C. (eds.): Avian Biology 8: 79-252. PDF fulltext
- Owen, Richard (1878): On Argillornis longipennis, Ow., a large Bird of flight, from the Eocene Clay of Sheppey.. Quarterly Journal of the Geological Society of London 34: 124–130.
- Stilwell, Jeffrey D; Jones, Craig M; Levy, Richard H. & Harwood, David M. (1998): First fossil bird from East Antarctica. Antarctic Journal of the United States 33(1): 12–16. PDF fulltext
- Tonni, Eduardo Pedro & Tambussi, Claudia Patricia (1985): Nuevos restos de Odontopterygia (Aves: Pelecaniformes) del Terciario temprano de Antártida ["New pseudotooth bird remains from the Early Tertiary of Antarctica"]. Ameghiniana 21(2-4): 121-124 [Spanish with English abstract]. HTML abstract
- Woodward, Arthur Smith (ed.) (1909): A Guide to the Fossil Mammals and Birds in the Department of Geology and Palaeontology of the British Museum (Natural History) (9th ed.). William Clowes and Sons Ltd., London. Fulltext at the Internet Archive
