= Tympanonesiotes =

Tympanonesiotes Temporal range: Late Oligocene or Early Miocene (see text)

Scientific classification
- Kingdom: Animalia
- Phylum: Chordata
- Class: Aves
- Order: †Odontopterygiformes
- Family: †Pelagornithidae
- Genus: †Tympanonesiotes; Hopson, 1964
- Species: †T. wetmorei

Binomial name
- †Tympanonesiotes wetmorei Hopson, 1964

Synonyms
- Tympanoneisiotes wetmorei (lapsus)

Extinct genus of birds

Tympanonesiotes is a somewhat doubtfully valid genus of the prehistoric pseudotooth birds. These were probably rather close relatives of either pelicans and storks, or of waterfowl, and are here placed in the order Odontopterygiformes to account for this uncertainty.

== Species and taxonomy ==
Only a single species, Tympanonesiotes wetmorei, is known to date. The only known specimen (USNM 16809), a distal right tarsometatarsus end, was found in the Cooper River near Drum Island (Charleston) at Charleston, South Carolina (United States). At first it was believed to be from the Early Miocene Hawthorne Formation, but as it seems its actual age cannot be precisely determined: For one thing, no Hawthorne Formation deposits were known in the region where the fossil was found. However, close to its type locality, fossils of Late Miocene animals have been found reworked from a now-eroded layer of rock into older deposits, such as the Chattian (Late Oligocene) sediments of the Cooper or Chandler Bridge Formation where the specimen of T. wetmorei was presumably found. The much-worn pseudotooth bird bone may also be such a reworked specimen.

The genus' scientific name references the type locality: it is derived from Ancient Greek tympanon (drum) + nesiotes (islander). The specific name honors the famous ornithologist Alexander Wetmore; thus the scientific name means roughly "Alexander Wetmore's Drum Island bird".

== Description ==
The bone is not very well preserved; for most of its length only the anterior surface remains. What remains of the trochleae is still preserved in good detail however. Altogether, the bone is very similar to that of the sympatric and probably contemporary Palaeochenoides mioceanus, only appearing a bit more albatross-like. The spread of the toes must have resembled that found in a fulmar quite a lot, by contrast. The thin-walled bone has a second toe trochlea that attaches notably kneewards from the others and is angled slightly outwards while the hallux was vestigial or missing, as is typical for the pseudotooth birds. The fossil is about one-quarter smaller than that of Palaeochenoides, with a maximum end width of 24.5 mm (0.96 in) (as far as the trochleae are preserved), and a shaft that is 16.1 mm (0.63 in) wide near the point where it flares into the trochleae. It was thus about half again as large as "Odontoptila inexpectata" from the Late Paleocene/Early Eocene of the Ouled Abdoul Basin (Morocco), i.e. around the size of the Early Eocene Odontopteryx toliapica from England or slightly bigger, or about the size of a great albatross (Diomedea) of our time. If the Tympanonesiotes fossil is indeed of Miocene age, it would be among the very few pseudotooth birds known from the Neogene that was not of immense size.

== Systematics ==
T. wetmorei was initially placed in the presumed pelecaniform family Cyphornithidae, which had been placed in the "pelecaniform" suborder Cladornithes, together with two other misidentified pseudotooth birds – Palaeochenoides and the family's type genus Cyphornis. The type genus of that supposed suborder, the enigmatic Late Oligocene Cladornis from the Argentinian part of Patagonia, like the present species is only known from a distal right tarsometatarsus end. This was believed to be reminiscent of the (then still undescribed) Tympanonesiotes, and thus it was argued that all four genera were closely related. But Cladornis is more generally held to be a terrestrial bird of unclear affiliations rather than a seabird nowadays, and the Cladornithes are not used anymore by recent authors.

As regards the supposed Cyphornithidae, most if not all pseudotooth birds placed there are probably closely related to the better-known Pelagornis, type genus of the family Pelagornithidae. And even if Cyphornis is the senior synonym of Palaeochenoides and Tympanoneisiotes (which is not overly likely), according to the rules of zoological nomenclature the family name Pelagornithidae would not be affected. Thus Cyphornithidae would almost certainly be a junior synonym of Pelagornithidae even if the pseudotooth birds are (as some have proposed) divided into several families – rather than being all placed in the Pelagornithidae as is usual nowadays – as Cyphornis, Osteodontornis, Palaeochenoides, Pelagornis and perhaps Tympanoneisiotes appear to be very closely related and are probably part of a monophyletic lineage of (usually) giant pseudotooth birds.
