= Piscator tenuirostris =

Piscator tenuirostris Temporal range: Eocene

Scientific classification
- Kingdom: Animalia
- Phylum: Chordata
- Class: Aves
- Order: Suliformes
- Family: Phalacrocoracidae
- Genus: †Piscator; Harrison and Walker, 1976
- Species: †P. tenuirostris

Binomial name
- †Piscator tenuirostris Harrison & Walker, 1976

Extinct species of bird

Piscator tenuirostris is an extinct species of cormorant-like bird, the only known species in the genus Piscator.

== Discovery ==
Piscator tenuirostris is known from an incomplete rostrum, the anterior end of a premaxilla, found in Hordle, England, in formations dating to the Priabonian, the final age of the Eocene Epoch. This holotype is now at the British Museum.

It was initially described by Colin Harrison and Cyril A. Walker in 1976, and placed in the family phalacrocoracidae. It was placed in class Aves incertae sedis by Jiří Mlíkovský in 2002.

A similar sample was found in the Late Eocene-early Oligocene Jebel Qatrani Formation in Faiyum, Egypt, but whether this sample represents P. tenuirostris, another Piscator species, or a different phalacrocoracid is unknown.

== Description ==
Piscator was similar to the extant phalacrocoracidae, a piscivorous family of aquatic birds. Remains were found in the Bracklesham Group in Hordle, England, which dates to the Priabonian, the last age of the Eocene epoch.

== Taxonomy ==
The genus was introduced by Cyril A. Walker and Colin Harrison in 1976. It was placed in class Aves incertae sedis by Jiří Mlíkovský in 2002. The word piscator is Latin for "fisherman." Other fossils may also represent species in this genus, but they have not been described as such, with some residing in private collections.

P. tenuirostris is the oldest discovered cormorant-like bird in the fossil record. It is the type specimen of its genus, and the only species of Piscator currently described.

== See also ==
- Valenticarbo
- List of fossil bird genera
