= Wyleyia =

Wyleyia Temporal range: Early Cretaceous, 138 Ma

Scientific classification
- Kingdom: Animalia
- Phylum: Chordata
- Class: Reptilia
- Clade: Dinosauria
- Clade: Saurischia
- Clade: Theropoda
- Clade: Maniraptora
- Genus: †Wyleyia; Harrison & Walker, 1973
- Species: †W. valdensis

Binomial name
- †Wyleyia valdensis Harrison & Walker, 1973

Extinct genus of dinosaurs

Wyleyia is an extinct genus of indeterminate maniraptoran dinosaurs containing a single species, Wyleyia valdensis, known from the early Cretaceous period of Sussex, England. The genus is known from a single specimen, a damaged right humerus. It was named to honor J. F. Wyley, who found the specimen in Weald Clay deposits of Henfield in Sussex (England). The specific name valdensis means "from the Weald".

The bone was found in the Hastings Beds, a series of Valanginian deposits, dated to 140 to 136 million years ago.

Formerly believed to be from a non-avialan coelurosaur, some researchers accepted it as an early bird, although its exact systematic position is unresolved. It has been proposed to be an enantiornithean or an early neornithine palaeognath. C.J.O. Harrison and C.A. Walker found it "advisable to consider the new genus incertae sedis until further evidence of affinity is forthcoming."

In 2007, Darren Naish and David M. Martill concluded that the bird-like characters of the humerus could not confidently be used to support avian affinities. As such, they regarded Wyleyia as an indeterminate member of the Maniraptora, a position followed by Barker and colleagues in their 2024 discussion on Cretaceous theropods of England.
