= Palaeochenoides =

Palaeochenoides Temporal range: Late Oligocene (see text)

Scientific classification
- Kingdom: Animalia
- Phylum: Chordata
- Class: Aves
- Order: †Odontopterygiformes
- Family: †Pelagornithidae
- Genus: †Palaeochenoides; Shufeldt, 1916
- Species: †P. mioceanus

Binomial name
- †Palaeochenoides mioceanus Shufeldt, 1916

Synonyms
- Palaeochenoides miocaenus (lapsus)

Extinct genus of birds

Palaeochenoides is a genus of the prehistoric pseudotooth birds of somewhat doubtful validity. These were probably rather close relatives of either pelicans and storks, or of waterfowl, and are here placed in the order Odontopterygiformes to account for this uncertainty.

Only a single species, Palaeochenoides mioceanus, is known to date. The first fossil assigned to it – a distal right femur piece – was found near the source of the Stono River in Charleston County, South Carolina (United States). At first it was believed to be from the Early Miocene Hawthorne Formation – its specific name, seemingly referring to the "Miocene ocean" as presumed habitat but actually a simple spelling error for "miocaenus", "from the Miocene", that was never corrected and hence became valid – alludes to this. But in fact no Hawthorne Formation rocks were known in the Charleston region when the fossil was found, and consequently modern authors consider a Chattian (Late Oligocene) age more likely and suggest the fossil came from the Cooper or Chandler Bridge Formation. Specimen MCZ 2514, a distal left tarsometatarsus fragment from the Ashley River, was more tentatively assigned to P. mioceanus later on; it was also erroneously believed to be from the Hawthorne Formation.

== Description and systematics ==
The holotype femur's classification mirrors the recently renewed uncertainties about the pseudotooth birds' placement. At the time of its description, when it was still much surrounded by matrix, it was believed to be from a giant goose or swan. This is referred to in the genus name, which means "ancient goose-like [bird]". But only one year later, the bone had been prepared from the matrix and was submitted to an improvised phenetic analysis of its details. It was compared to that of Anserinae and Dendrocygninae (other Anseriformes were either similar to these or too unlike P. mioceanus), as well as with Pelecanidae, Phaethontidae and Phalacrocoraciformes of the "higher waterbird" radiation, and found to resemble the former in one, the latter in 4 out of 5 traits. Some minor details of the femur were also unlike in the Anseriformes. The study proposed the fossil bird to have been "a large steganopod [...] somewhat larger than Pelecanus erythrorhynchos or P. onocrotalus," and not securely assignable to a known family. But as cladistic analysis had not yet been developed, it was of course not studied whether the similarities between P. mioceanus and the "higher waterbirds" are apomorphies. It has been noted, however, that adaptation to oceanic habits, has induced in pseudotooth bird legs and feet features convergent to other seabirds. Still, the fossil is a rather good specimen, considering how little humerus material known from pseudotooth birds; a recent cladistic analysis (which did not include P. mioceanus) did not put much emphasis on humerus traits, for example, as so few good fossils are known.

When Witmer Stone, then editor of The Auk, commented on the taxonomic confusion that the bird caused during less than 25 months after its description, he noted:

"It would seem desirable that those who name fossil birds should not fashion their generic names on those of existing birds as it is embarrassing to find them shifted into other families or orders where the name becomes somewhat of a misnomer!"

Of the tarsometatarsus, only the end remains, but this is complete and even not very much abraded. Only on the edges of the outer trochleae does significant material seem to be lost. Altogether, the bone is very similar to that of the sympatric and probably contemporary Tympanonesiotes wetmorei, only appearing a bit less albatross-like. The spread of the toes must have resembled that found in a fulmar quite a lot, by contrast. The thin-walled bone has a second toe trochlea that attaches notably kneewards from the others and is angled slightly outwards while the hallux was vestigial or missing, as is typical for the pseudotooth birds. The fossil is about one-quarter larger than that of Tympanonesiotes, with a maximum end width of 34.7 mm (1.37 in) – probably a bit more in life, as the trochlea rims are eroded away. The shaft is 22.3 mm (0.88 in) wide at the point where it flares into the trochleae. It was thus more than twice as large as "Odontoptila inexpectata" from the Late Paleocene/Early Eocene of the Ouled Abdoul Basin (Morocco), and – like Osteodontornis orri – thus belonged to the large pseudotooth birds, with a wingspan of more than 5, perhaps as much as 6 m (16–20 ft). Its bill was presumably long and massive as in its relatives, and in length the bird exceeded the largest pelicans.

The early systematic uncertainties have been noted again in recent times, in the scope of the debate whether the pseudotooth birds were Galloanseres closely related to waterfowl or Neoaves related to pelicans. Meanwhile, as a presumed pelican relative, P. mioceanus was allied with Cyphornis (another pseudotooth bird, known only from a proximal left tarsometatarsus) and placed in a family Cyphornithidae. This was subsequently assigned to a "pelecaniform" suborder Cladornithes. But the enigmatic Late Oligocene Cladornis – the type genus of that supposed suborder – from the Argentinian part of Patagonia is known from a distal right tarsometatarsus only, and thus was not directly comparable to Palaeochenoides and Cyphornis. Tympanonesiotes wetmorei, yet another pseudotooth bird, known from a distal right tarsometatarsus fragment, was initially presumed to be similar to Cladornis however, and also to Cyphornis; consequently, the three genera were allied simply because of their size and some similarities to the corresponding bones of pelicans. Today however, Cladornis is more generally held to be a terrestrial bird rather than a seabird.

As regards the supposed Cyphornithidae, most if not all pseudotooth birds placed there are probably closely related to the better-known Pelagornis, type genus of the family Pelagornithidae. And even if Cyphornis is the senior synonym of Palaeochenoides and Tympanoneisiotes (which is not overly likely due to size differences), according to the rules of zoological nomenclature the family name Pelagornithidae would not be affected. Cyphornithidae would almost certainly be a junior synonym of Pelagornithidae even if the pseudotooth birds are (as some have proposed) divided into several families – rather than being all placed in the Pelagornithidae as is usual nowadays – as Cyphornis, Osteodontornis, Palaeochenoides, Pelagornis and perhaps the smaller Tympanoneisiotes appear to be very closely related and are probably part of a monophyletic lineage of (usually) giant pseudotooth birds. As at the time of its description no adequate comparative material was known, it was explicitly cautioned that P. mioceanus might include Pseudodontornis – which may actually be synonymous with Pelagornis.
