= Macrodontopteryx =

Macrodontopteryx Temporal range: Early Eocene 51–50 Ma

Scientific classification
- Domain: Eukaryota
- Kingdom: Animalia
- Phylum: Chordata
- Class: Aves
- Order: †Odontopterygiformes
- Family: †Pelagornithidae
- Genus: †Macrodontopteryx; Harrison & C.A.Walker, 1976
- Species: †M. oweni

Binomial name
- †Macrodontopteryx oweni Harrison & C.A.Walker, 1976

Synonyms
- see text

Extinct genus of birds

Macrodontopteryx is a genus of the prehistoric pseudotooth birds of somewhat doubtful validity. These animals were probably rather close relatives of either pelicans and storks, or of waterfowl, and are here placed in the order Odontopterygiformes to account for this uncertainty.

== Description ==
Only a single species, Macrodontopteryx oweni, is known to date. Its remains were found in the Ypresian (Early Eocene) London Clay of the Isle of Sheppey (England), where they were deposited about 50 Ma (million years ago) in the Mammal Paleogene zone MP8-9. The fossils were at first assigned to Argillornis longipennis, which is nowadays recognized as junior synonym of Dasornis emuinus, a larger pseudotooth bird than M. oweni. Due to the scarcity of their fossil remains, is not clear whether the pseudotooth bird species described as Pseudodontornis longidentata is not the same as M. oweni, though its size suggests that it is more likely to be synonymous with D. emuinus. In any case, Macrodontopteryx itself may well be no distinct genus but rather a large member of the contemporary and sympatric Odontopteryx, or a young or small Dasornis.

The only known specimen (BMNH A1) is an incomplete and rather crushed skull with much all of the beak missing. In the living animal it would have measured roughly 30–35 cm (one foot). The wingspan was probably around 4 m (13 ft).

== Other supposed remains ==
If Macrodontopteryx is indeed a distinct genus, perhaps some pseudotooth bird fossils found in Lutetian (Middle Eocene, MP11-13, about 45 Ma) deposits at Etterbeek (Belgium) belong therein. Like the holotype BMNH A1, they have been assigned to Argillornis longipennis in the past; at least some of the material placed in that taxon at one time or another – but not its syntype humerus pieces – seems too small to be of an adult Dasornis.

An Early Oligocene (Stampian, MP21-23, about 32 Ma) distal radius from Hamstead, Isle of Wight (England) was also assigned to Macrodontopteryx. It is without doubt from a very large and flight-capable bird, but little else can be said about it. An equally old cervical vertebra fragment (specimen BMNH A-4413) and a toe phalanx from nearby Yarmouth were, mainly due to their size, believed to be related to the enigmatic large flightless bird (and presumed ratite) Eleutherornis. They were described as Proceriavis martini, but have never been compared in detail to pseudotooth bird fossils. It cannot be ruled out that Proceriavis belongs in the Pelagornithidae, but whether it would be a junior synonym of Macrodontopteryx is highly uncertain given the 20-million-year difference between the Isle of Sheppey and Isle of Wight material. Recent analysis suggests that the material referred to as Proceriavis is in fact ratite in nature.
