= Gigantornis =

Gigantornis Temporal range: Middle Eocene

Scientific classification
- Kingdom: Animalia
- Phylum: Chordata
- Class: Aves
- Order: †Odontopterygiformes
- Family: †Pelagornithidae
- Genus: †Gigantornis; Andrews, 1916
- Species: †G. eaglesomei

Binomial name
- †Gigantornis eaglesomei Andrews, 1916

Extinct genus of birds

Gigantornis eaglesomei is a very large prehistoric bird described from a fragmentary specimen from the Eocene of Nigeria. It was originally described as a representative of the albatross family, Diomedeidae, but was later referred to the pseudotooth or bony-toothed bird family, Pelagornithidae. Gigantornis is one of the largest pseudotooth birds, with an inferred wingspan of about 6 m (20 ft) it is among the largest birds ever.

Its identified remains consist of a broken sternum found in Middle Eocene Ameki Formation deposits at Ameki (Nigeria). The fossil bird was considered to belong the albatross family (Diomedeidae), as no sterna of pseudotooth birds were known until its discovery, and it remained the only such specimen for decades. Only in the 1970s its true affinities were realized, after it had become clear that although it must have been from a dynamic soarer with wings like an albatross, it resembled pelicans (order Ciconiiformes) rather than tubenoses (order Procellariiformes, to which albatrosses belong) in its details.

It is not known whether this bird belongs to a distinct genus; it might even be the very same species as the similar-sized Dasornis emuinus, whose fossils are not uncommon in the Ypresian (Early Eocene) London Clay of the Isle of Sheppey (England). Remains of a large pseudotooth bird were also found in the Middle Eocene of Kpogamé-Hahotoé (Togo) and have been provisionally termed "Aequornis traversei"; their analysis is likely to provide at least some insight on the taxonomic status of G. eaglesomei.

The Gigantornis sternum is of the typical short and deep-crested shape found in dynamic soarers. Compared to LHNB (CCCP)-1, a Middle to Late Miocene pseudotooth bird sternum found in Portugal and tentatively assigned to Pelagornis, its articular facet for the furcula consists of a flat section at the very tip of the sternal keel and a similar one set immediately above it at an outward angle, and the spina externa is shaped like an Old French shield in cross-section. The slightly smaller LHNB (CCCP)-1 has a less sharply protruding sternal keel, the articular facet for the furcula consists of a large knob at the forward margin, and the spina externa is narrow in cross-section.
