= Valenticarbo =

Valenticarbo Temporal range: Late Pliocene/Early Pleistocene

Scientific classification
- Kingdom: Animalia
- Phylum: Chordata
- Class: Aves
- Order: Suliformes
- Family: Phalacrocoracidae
- Genus: †Valenticarbo; Harrison, 1979
- Species: †V. praetermissus

Binomial name
- †Valenticarbo praetermissus Harrison, 1979

Extinct genus of birds

Valenticarbo is a supposed genus of extinct bird that lived during the Late Pliocene or Early Pleistocene (c. 1.8 mya) of South Asia. It contains only the type species, V. praetermissus.

Harrison (1979) erected this genus because he found himself unable to assign a 19th-century plaster cast of a broken tarsometatarsus bone originally retrieved from Siwalik Hills sediments to modern cormorants. As the fossil itself is apparently lost, this makes the genus a nomen dubium.

Few other researchers have commented on this, most deciding not to discuss this taxon. Those that did chided Harrison's decision to assign an undiagnostic and possibly damaged cast as a type specimen of a new genus. Olson (1985) called it

"...very near the acme of zealotry for naming new species of fossil birds. It is highly doubtful that the genus Valenticarbo could be shown to be valid, even if a specimen of it did exist."

Carroll (1988) considers this "genus" a synonym of Phalacrocorax, the modern cormorants. Given that fossil cormorants not assignable to Phalacrocorax are not known to have occurred later than Early Pliocene, this is likely to be correct, but the possibility that the original fossil was not of a cormorant at all cannot be discounted.
