= Cyphornis =

Cyphornis Temporal range: Early Miocene (see text)

Scientific classification
- Kingdom: Animalia
- Phylum: Chordata
- Class: Aves
- Order: †Odontopterygiformes
- Family: †Pelagornithidae
- Genus: †Cyphornis; Cope, 1894
- Species: †C. magnus

Binomial name
- †Cyphornis magnus Cope, 1894

Synonyms
- See text

Extinct genus of birds

Cyphornis is a genus of the prehistoric pseudotooth birds. These were probably rather close relatives of either pelicans and storks, or of waterfowl, and are here placed in the order Odontopterygiformes to account for this uncertainty.

== Description ==
Only a single species, Cyphornis magnus, is known to date. It is only known with certainty from a single specimen, the rather abraded proximal part of a left tarsometatarsus which was found at Carmanah Point on Vancouver Island (Canada), where the Juan de Fuca Strait opens into the Pacific. The deposits from which it originated were initially dated to the Eocene; subsequent authors have usually assigned them to the Early Miocene though certainly rocks from around the Eo-Oligocene boundary also occur in the region where it was found. At the time of its discovery, it "probably represent[ed] the largest known bird of flight." Even today it is one of the largest (though not heaviest) flying birds known.

Some huge pseudotooth wing bone fossils have been found in Oregon. Specimen LACM 128462, a mostly complete proximal end of a left ulna, originates from the Keasey Formation of Washington County. LACM 127875 are fragments of the proximal humerus ends, the proximal right ulna and the right radius of a single individual presumed to be of the same species; they were found in the Pittsburg Bluff Formation near Mist. These remains all date from the Eo-Oligocene boundary, and considering their size they may well be of C. magnus if it is in fact that old, or of its ancestor or older relative.

== Systematics ==
Due to its fragmentary nature – the bones of pseudotooth bords are very thin-walled and light and notoriously easily broken and crushed when fossilizing – it was often allied with the enigmatic Cladornis, and though placed in the order Pelecaniformes (as pseudotooth birds often were) separated in a suborder Cladornithes. But the slightly older (Late Oligocene) Cladornis from the Argentinian part of Patagonia is known from a distal right tarsometatarsus only, and thus not directly comparable to Cyphornis. The two genera were allied simply because of their size and because they both vaguely reminded of the tarsometatarsus of pelicans. Today however, Cladornis is more generally held to be a terrestrial bird rather than a seabird. Other authors had been more conservative all along, and considered Cyphornis quite close to pelicans, uniting these as a superfamily Pelecanides in suborder Pelecanae, or later on (after the endings of taxonomic ranks were fixed to today's standard) Pelecanoidea in suborder Pelecani.

To set it apart from its alleged relatives, Cyphornis was early on separated in a family Cyphornithidae together with Palaeochenoides mioceanus and eventually also Tympanonesiotes wetmorei which are also little-known pseudotooth birds but inhabited the Atlantic. But these are probably all closely related to the better-known Pelagornis, type genus of the family Pelagornithidae. And even if Cyphornis is the senior synonym of all the later-described genera (which is not very likely), according to the rules of zoological nomenclature the family name Pelagornithidae would not change. Thus Cyphornithidae would almost certainly be a junior synonym of Pelagornithidae even if the pseudotooth birds are (as some have proposed) divided into several families – rather than being all placed in the Pelagornithidae as is usual nowadays –, as Cyphornis, Osteodontornis, Palaeochenoides, Pelagornis and perhaps the smaller Tympanoneisiotes appear to be very closely related and are probably all part of a monophyletic lineage of (usually) giant pseudotooth birds. Only if the Pacific lineage is sufficiently distinct, the Cyphornithidae would remain valid, but in this case they would presumably not include the Atlantic forms.
