= Butorides validipes =

Butorides validipes Temporal range: Early Pleistocene

Scientific classification
- Kingdom: Animalia
- Phylum: Chordata
- Class: Aves
- Order: Pelecaniformes
- Family: Ardeidae
- Genus: Butorides
- Species: †B. validipes

Binomial name
- †Butorides validipes Campbell, 1976

Extinct species of bird

Butorides validipes is an extinct species of Butorides that lived during the Early Pleistocene.

== Distribution ==
Butorides validipes fossils are known from late Blancan deposits in Florida.
