= Equatorial Current =

Equatorial Current can refer to:

- Equatorial Counter Current
- North Equatorial Current
- South Equatorial Current
