= Nye Formation =

American geologic formation in Oregon

- Stratigraphic range: Neogene
- Type: Formation

Location
- Coordinates: 44.6707°N 124.0295°W
- Region: Lincoln County, Oregon
- Country: United States

Type section
- Named for: Nye Beach

The Nye Formation is a geologic formation in Oregon. It preserves fossils dating back to the Neogene period.

== See also ==
- List of fossiliferous stratigraphic units in Oregon
- Paleontology in Oregon
