= Kálmán Lambrecht =

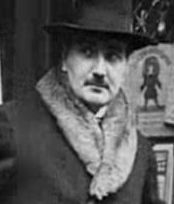
Photo of Kálmán Lambrecht

Kálmán Lambrecht (1889–1936) was a Hungarian palaeontologist, best known for his work on fossil birds. He authored the “Handbuch der Palaeornithologie”, an exhaustive review of fossil birds published in 1933. Positions held include librarianship of the Geological Survey of Hungary. He died of heart failure in Budapest.
