= Hildegarde Howard =

American paleornithologist

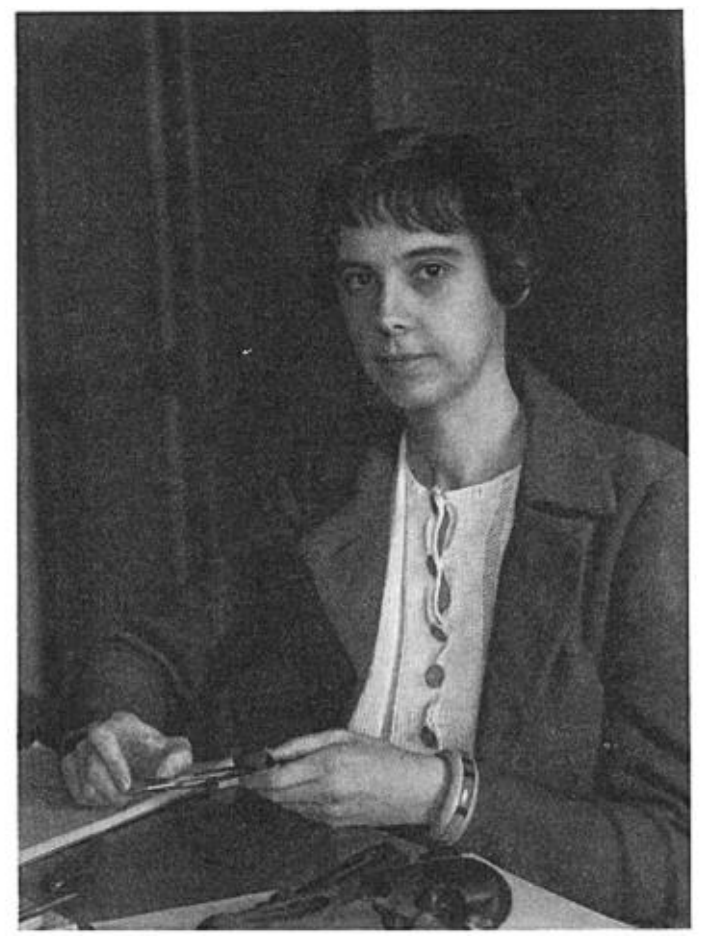
- Howard, c. 1936 (Condor 38: 128)
- Born: April 3, 1901; Washington, D.C.
- Died: February 28, 1998 (aged 96); Laguna Hills, California
- Education: U.C. Berkeley
- Known for: Significant contributions to the field of paleornithology
- Spouse: Henry Anson Wylde (married 1930)
- Awards: Brewster Medal
- Scientific career
- Fields: Paleornithology
- Workplaces: Los Angeles County Museum of Natural History
- Thesis: (1928)
- Doctoral advisors: Joseph Grinnell
- Other academic advisors: William Diller Matthew, Loye H. Miller

Hildegarde Howard (April 3, 1901 – February 28, 1998) was an American pioneer in paleornithology. She was mentored by the famous ornithologist, Joseph Grinnell, at the Museum of Vertebrate Zoology (MVZ) and in avian paleontology. She was well known for her discoveries in the La Brea Tar Pits, among them the Rancho La Brea eagles. She discovered and described Pleistocene flightless waterfowl at the prehistoric Ballona wetlands of coastal Los Angeles County at Playa del Rey. In 1953, Howard became the third woman to be awarded the Brewster Medal. She was the first woman president of the Southern California Academy of Sciences. Hildegarde wrote 150 papers throughout her career.

== Biography ==
Howard was born in Washington, D.C., and moved with her parents to Los Angeles in 1906; her father was a scriptwriter and her mother a musician and composer. In 1920 Howard commenced her studies at the Southern Branch of the University of California (later renamed UCLA). Her first biology teacher, Pirie Davidson, inspired her to change her concentration from journalism to biology; Davidson helped her get a job working for the paleontologist Chester Stock. She completed her bachelor's degree at U.C. Berkeley in 1924, where she took courses in paleontology. That same year, Howard joined the scientific staff of the Los Angeles County Museum of Natural History part-time; her work there on the extinct turkey Parapavo californicus was credited towards her master's degree, which was received in 1926 at Berkeley. She would earn her Ph.D. at the same university in 1928 with a dissertation on the fossil birds of the Emeryville Shellmound.

In 1929 Howard returned to the Los Angeles County Museum of Natural History and she held a permanent position there as a curator. However, she was not officially given the title of a curator until 1938. Her initial title was Junior clerk and Howard's job was researching fossils from the Rancho La Brea as well as curating them. Named chief curator of science in 1951, she retired in 1961, but continued to conduct research and to publish on avian evolution. While at the museum and in retirement, Howard described three families, 13 genera, 57 species, and 2 subspecies. In 1977 the Los Angeles Museum of History decided to honour Hildegarde Howard in the Cenozoic life Hall.

Howard married Henry Anson Wylde in 1930. Wylde, who would become chief of exhibits at the Los Angeles County Museum of Natural History, died in 1984. Hildegarde Howard died on 28 February 1998 at her home in California, not long before her 97th birthday.

== Significant works ==
Howard published some 150 scientific papers over the course of her career.

Some of Howard's most transformative work was done at the La Brea Tar Pits. The La Brea tar Pits were filled with vast quantities of bird bones, which would provide extensive research potential for Howard throughout her life. Howard's first introduction to the field was sorting bones from La Brea at the Los Angeles County Museum of Natural History, where she would also meet her future husband Henry Anson Wylde.

=== New avian fossil ===
In Howard's New Avian Fossil research she found an extinct family of seabirds. Howard was allowed to research a coracoid bone (between the shoulder blade and sternum) discovered for a species of bird not yet known by the public record. She concluded through previous evidence and modern avians that the bird was a previously unknown species of water bird by the shape of the shoulder and chest bone. She named this family of pelecaniformes seabirds plotopteridae.

=== Review of extinct avian genus ===
Howard conducted an experiment in which she took wasps from their home ecosystem and brought them to a greenhouse to see how they would take to the conditions of isolation and whether or not they would nest in that environment. After corrections to the methodology of the experiment, she was able to collect 41 nests to study the structure of their nesting.

=== The avifauna of Emeryville Shellmound ===
Howard's 1929 dissertation, "The Avifauna of Emeryville Shellmound" was particularly influential at the time. The dissertation she wrote thoroughly labelled ornithological fossil specimens, and paired the terms with visual representations. This allowed common terminology to be taught and widely popularized her work in the field. Her diagrams were eventually phased out after Nomina Anatomica Avium was published in 1997. The Avifauna of Emeryville Shellmound was important because it set the grounds of vocabulary for avian paleontology. Howard detailed, named and labelled a baseline for the skeletal makeup of all birds. This work solidified her significance in the world of paleontology and continues to stay a point of agreement for paleontologists of all levels. The names used are still widely referenced and give a strong baseline when labelling unknown species.

=== A census of the Pleistocene birds ===
Howard compared two studies regarding the Pleistocene animals of the Rancho La Brea region. One of them was a census conducted by Dr. Chester Stock regarding mammals of the region, while the other was a census of the birds. This entry sought the common factors, if any, between the two groups. She found that there was a limitation on the age of the animals from the Rancho La Brea exhibit. This effect was only manifested in the specimens that came from the early to the middle part of the late Pleistocene era.

- Howard, Hildegarde (1929), "The avifauna of Emeryville shellmound", University of California Publications in Zoology, 32 (2): 301–394
- Howard described the first "toothed" bird from North America and assigned the name "Osteodontornis" to it.
- Howard, Hildegarde (1962), "Fossil Birds", Science Series, 17: 44
- Howard, Hildegarde (1969), "A New Avian Fossil from Kern County, California", The Condor, 71 (1): 68–69, doi:10.2307/1366050, JSTOR 1366050
- Howard, Hildegarde (1970), "A review of the extinct avian genus, Mancalla", Contributions in Science, 203: 1–12, doi:10.5962/p.241190, S2CID 89964688

=== Examination of abnormal wing of a pintail duck ===
In this paper, Howard examined the possibility of regeneration after a man claimed that a Northern pintail duck who had its wing shot off was able to grow it back. When the specimen was submitted to the Los Angeles Museum, it was noted that there was a new portion joined to the old portion. The entry detailed this evidence; however, Howard did not conclude that this was the regeneration of the bones, since it had never been recorded before. She kept the possibility open because of the close relation between reptiles and birds, since reptiles have the ability to regenerate.

=== New species of owl ===
At the Los Angeles Museum, a collection called Rancho La Brea contains the bones of the Horned Owl which she had noted to be abnormal. The size of the bones could have easily been mistaken for the bones of a variety of North American as well as South American owls. She finds that the fossils resemble closest to Strix even though it is larger than either species that could be found in North America of the genus. She goes into a full-depth investigation along with evidence filled with measurements and comparisons and finally comes to the conclusion that the bones found in the exhibit were of a new species, which is now named Oraristrix brea. She published her findings in The Condor in 1932, naming the entry 'A New Species of Owl from the Pleistocene of Rancho La Brea, California'.

=== Contribution to new road-runner species ===
Located in the Conkling Cavern in Doña Ana County, New Mexico, the remains of extinct mammals were found and were initially hypothesized to be from the Geococcyx californianus. After comparing the new specimen with the bones of other Geococcyx californius from New Mexico, Arizona and Mexico, Howard observed that none of them are similar in size to the specimen. A year earlier, fossils were discovered two miles away in another cave, whose size was similar to the specimen and exemplified further the dissimilarity with the great roadrunner. Hence, Howard proposed that this specimen be classified as a new species called the Geococcyx conklingi..

== Awards ==
- 1953 Brewster Medal (third woman to be awarded the Brewster Medal)
- 1962 Guggenheim Fellow, Earth Science
- Elected President, Southern California Academy of Sciences (first woman president)
- 1977 - Honored by having Hildegarde Howard Cenozoic Hall, Southern California Academy of Sciences, named after her
- 1963 - Honorary Member, Cooper Ornithological Society

== Further research ==
- Joy Harvey & Marilyn Ogilvie (2000), The Biographical Dictionary of Women in Science, Volume 1, pp. 621 et seq
- Campbell, Kenneth E. Jr., editor. 1980. "Papers in Avian Paleontology Honoring Hildegarde Howard", Contributions in Science: Natural History Museum of Los Angeles County, No. 330 (September 15, 1970), 296 p. (Includes biographical sketches and a bibliography of her works.)
- Campbell, Kenneth E. Jr. (2000). "In Memoriam: Hildegarde Howard, 1901–1998". The Auk. 117 (3): 775–779. doi:10.2307/4089601. JSTOR 4089601.
- Campbell, Kenneth E. Jr. (2000). "Hildegarde Howard". Society of Vertebrate Paleontology News Bulletin. 178: 131–133.

Archives

- Hildegarde Howard Papers, archives, George C. Page Museum, Hancock Park, California
- Hildegarde Howard Papers, archives, Natural History Museum of Los Angeles County, Los Angeles, California
- Chester Stock Papers, George C. Page Museum, Hancock Park, Museum
