= Cladornis =

Cladornis Temporal range: Oligocene

Scientific classification
- Kingdom: Animalia
- Phylum: Chordata
- Class: Aves
- Infraclass: Neognathae
- Clade: Neoaves
- Genus: †Cladornis; Ameghino, 1895

Type species
- †Cladornis pachypus (Ameghino, 1895)

Extinct genus of birds

Cladornis is an extinct genus of bird from the early Oligocene of Argentina. Known from a single partial tarsometatarsus, its taxonomic placement is uncertain. It has been variously described as some kind of terrestrial penguin, a pelecaniform, and a "very large and extremely weird land bird". The shaft of the tarsometatarsus of Cladornis was very flat and short, and the distal head suggests strong development of the toes.
