= Colin Harrison (ornithologist) =

English ornithologist

Colin James Oliver Harrison (18 August 1926 – 17 November 2003) was an English ornithologist.

Harrison was born in London. He got a scholarship to grammar school, and then worked as a librarian and a teacher. He had been interested in birds since childhood, and joined an expedition to study autumn migration in Norway. He became a professional ornithologist at the age of 34 and became responsible for the care of the national collection of birds' nests and eggs in the Bird Room at the Natural History Museum at Tring, Hertfordshire. In 1966 he led the fourth of the series of Harold Hall Australian ornithological collecting expeditions.

Harrison later became interested in biogeography and the museum's avian paleontological collection, on which he published a number of articles with Cyril Walker. He studied and published on different aspects of bird behaviour, on plumage patterns, and on the bone structure of modern and fossil birds. He identified Eostrix vincenti in 1980.

== Bibliography (incomplete) ==
- Atlas of the Birds of the Western Palearctic (Collins, 1982)
- History of the Birds of Britain (Collins, 1988)
- A Field Guide to the Nests, Eggs and Nestlings of British and European Birds (Quadrangle, 1975)
