= Cyril Walker (palaeontologist) =

British palaeontologist

Cyril Alexander Walker (8 February 1939 – 6 May 2009) was a British palaeontologist, curator of fossil birds in the Natural History Museum. He was also interested in fossil turtles.

Walker joined the Museum in 1958 and spent his entire career there, becoming curator in 1985.

Walker's most noteworthy finding was his recognition of a new subclass of fossils birds, the Enantiornithes.

Together with David Ward, he co-authored a best selling book, Smithsonian Handbook of Fossils. He has also contributed to many other books, including Garden Birds, Field Guide to British Birds, Birds of the World, Nature Notebooks, and others.

An unidentified moa bone of unknown origin and locality, donated by Dr. C. Walker to ornithologist Zlatozar Boev in 1986, was later identified as the little bush moa (Anomalopteryx didiformis). It is the only specimen of Dinornithiformes in the collections of the National Museum of Natural History, Bulgarian Academy of Sciences in Sofia.
