= Pena =

Pena may refer to:

- Pena (footballer), Brazilian soccer player
- Pena (musical instrument), an Indian musical instrument
- Pena (surname)
- Pena National Palace, Sintra, Portugal
- "Pena", a song by Captain Beefheart on the album Trout Mask Replica
- Tropical Storm Pena (2026), a tropical storm in 2026 in the open central Pacific basin

== See also ==
- Peña (disambiguation)
- Penha (disambiguation)
- Pina (disambiguation)
- Piña (disambiguation)
