= Peñas (disambiguation) =

Peñas is a location in the La Paz Department in Bolivia.

Peñas, meaning "rocky outcrops" or "rocky summits" in Spanish (Aragonese: Penyas, Catalan: Penyas), may also refer to:

== Geography ==
- Cabo de Peñas, or Cape Peñas, the location of the municipality of Gozón, Spain
- Gulf of Penas, a body of water located south of the Taitao Peninsula, Chile
- Peñas Azules, a peak in Argentina
- Peñas Blancas, a village and municipality in Río Negro Province in Argentina
- Peñas del Chache, a rocky mountain located in the Famara massif
- Peñas Chatas, a corregimiento in Ocú District, Herrera Province, Panama

== People ==
- Adriana González-Peñas (born 1986), Spanish former professional tennis player
- Ánxeles Penas (born 1943), Spanish poet
- Maxine Penas (1946-2008), American politician and educator.
- Mercedes Peñas Domingo (born 1968), Spanish–Costa Rican political scientist
- Oscar Peñas (born 1972), Spanish-born jazz composer-guitarist based in New York
- Óscar Peñas (born 1974), male judoka from Spain

== Other ==
- Penas Air, regional airline service in Indonesia

== See also ==
- Peña (disambiguation)
