= Peña =

In the Spanish language, peña (Aragonese: penya, Catalan: penya) means "rocky outcrop" or "rocky summit"; alternatively, a peña is a group or gathering of people with a common purpose or interest.

Peña may refer to:

== Mountains ==
- Peña Montañesa, a mountain in the Pre-Pyrenees, Aragon, Spain
- Peña de los Enamorados, a mountain near Antequera, Andalusia, Spain
- Peña de Bernal, a mountain in Querétaro, Mexico
- Peña Prieta, a mountain in the Cantabrian Mountains, highest point of the range outside the Picos de Europa
- Peña Cebollera, a mountain in the Sistema Ibérico, one of the four highest peaks of the system
- Peña de las Once, a mountain in the Pyrenees, Sobrarbe, Aragon; see List of mountains in Aragon
- Peña del Mediodía, a mountain in the Pyrenees, Sobrarbe, Aragon; see List of mountains in Aragon
- Peña Forca, a mountain in the Pyrenees, Jacetania, Aragon; see List of mountains in Aragon
- Peña Gratal, a mountain in the Pre-Pyrenees, Hoya de Huesca, Aragon; see List of mountains in Aragon
- Peña Falconera, a point near Morrano, Aragon, Spain
- Peña Mira, the highest point in the Sierra de la Culebra range, Castile & León
- Peña Nobla, a mountain in the Pyrenees, Jacetania/Cinco Villas, Aragon; see List of mountains in Aragon
- Peña Oroel, a mountain in the Pyrenees, Jacetania, Aragon; see List of mountains in Aragon
- Peña Solana, a mountain in the Pyrenees, Sobrarbe, Aragon; see List of mountains in Aragon
- Peña Foratata, a mountain in the Pyrenees, Alto Gállego, Aragon
- Peña Telera, a mountain in the Pyrenees, Alto Gállego, Aragon
- Peña de Herrera, a mountain in the Moncayo Massif, Campo de Borja, Aragon; see List of mountains in Aragon
- Peña Trevinca, a mountain in Galicia, Spain
- Penyagolosa, a mountain in the Sistema Ibérico, Valencian Community, Spain
- Penyagalera, a mountain in the Sistema Ibérico, Aragon, Spain

== People ==
- Peña (surname)
  - List of people with surname Peña
- de la Peña

== Places ==
- Cayo Luis Peña, an island and municipality of Puerto Rico
- Sáenz Peña, Buenos Aires, a town in Argentina
- Presidencia Roque Sáenz Peña, a city in Chaco, Argentina
- Presidente Roque Sáenz Peña Department, in Córdoba, Argentina
- Peñarrubia, Abra, a municipality of the Philippines
- Tamboril, Dominican Republic, formerly Peña
- Peña Municipality, a municipality in Yaracuy, Venezuela

== Sports ==
- Supporters' club, particularly in Spanish football
- Peña Sport FC
- Penya Encarnada d'Andorra
- Penya Rhin Grand Prix

== Other uses ==
- Peña (music), a meeting place or grouping of musicians or artists

== See also ==
- La Peña (disambiguation)
- Pena (disambiguation)
- Peña Blanca (disambiguation)
- Penha (disambiguation)
- Peñas (disambiguation)
- Peñón, a type of Spanish rocky island fort
- Pina (disambiguation)
- Piña (disambiguation)
