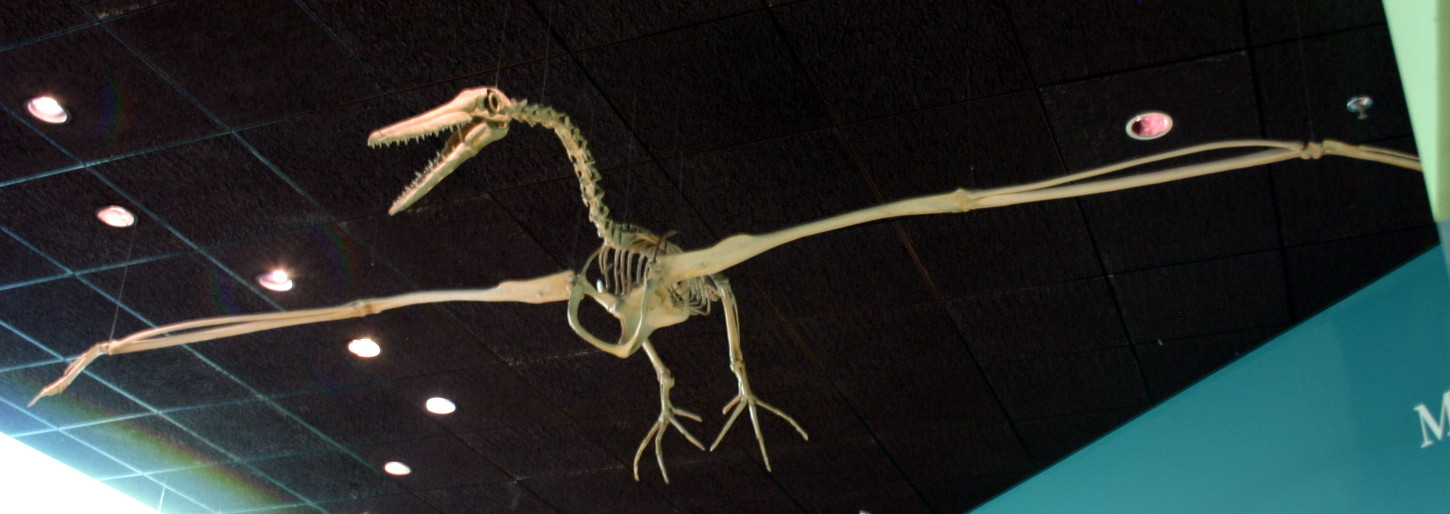
- Replica of a Pelagornis miocaenus skeleton at the National Museum of Natural History

Scientific classification
- Kingdom: Animalia
- Phylum: Chordata
- Class: Aves
- Infraclass: Neognathae
- Order: †Odontopterygiformes; Howard, 1957
- Family: †Pelagornithidae; Fürbringer, 1888

Genera
- See text

Synonyms
- Family synonymy but see text: Cyphornithidae Wetmore, 1928; Dasornithidae Harrison & Walker, 1976; Gyphornithidae (lapsus); Odontopterygidae Lydekker, 1891; Pseudodontornithidae Lambrecht, 1933

= Pelagornithidae =

Pelagornithidae Temporal range: Paleocene (Danian) – Pleistocene (Gelasian) 62–2.5 Ma

Extinct family of seabirds

The Pelagornithidae, commonly called pelagornithids, pseudodontorns, bony-toothed birds, false-toothed birds or pseudotooth birds, are a prehistoric family of large seabirds. Their fossil remains have been found all over the world in rocks dating between the Early Paleocene and the Pliocene-Pleistocene boundary.

Most of the common names refer to these birds' most notable trait: tooth-like points on their beak's edges, which, unlike true teeth, contained Volkmann's canals and were outgrowths of the premaxillary and mandibular bones. Even "small" species of pseudotooth birds were the size of albatrosses; the largest ones had wingspans estimated at 5–6 metres (15–20 ft) and were among the largest flying birds ever to live. They were the dominant seabirds of most oceans throughout most of the Cenozoic, and modern humans apparently missed encountering them only by a tiny measure of evolutionary time: the last known pelagornithids were contemporaries of Homo habilis and the beginning of the history of technology.

== Description and ecology ==
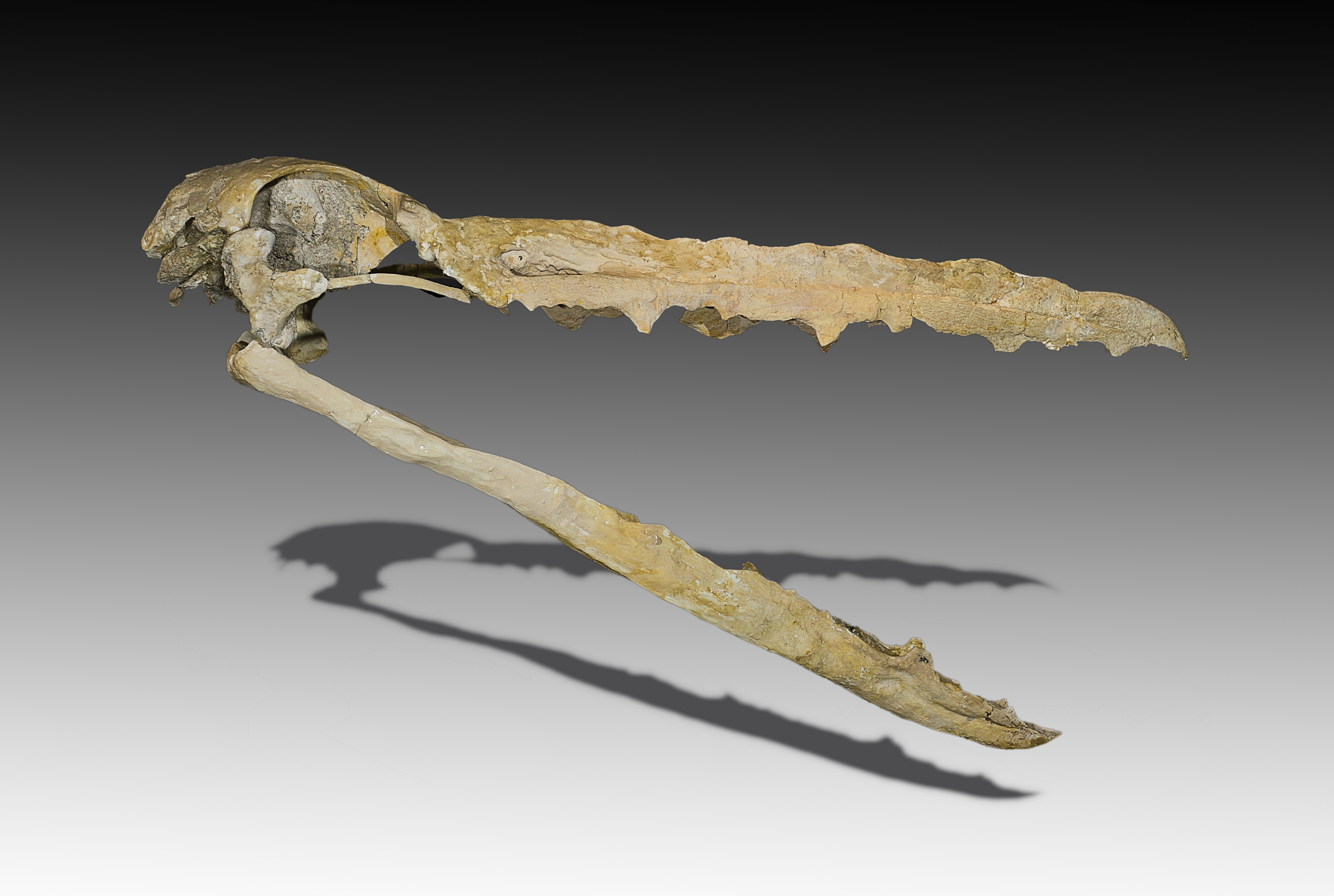
Skull of Pelagornis mauretanicus

The biggest of the pseudotooth birds were the largest flying birds known. Almost all of their remains from the Neogene are immense, but in the Paleogene there were a number of pelagornithids that were around the size of a great albatross (genus Diomedea) or even a bit smaller. The undescribed species provisionally called "Odontoptila inexpectata" – from the Paleocene-Eocene boundary of Morocco – is the smallest pseudotooth bird discovered to date and was just a bit larger than a white-chinned petrel (Procellaria aequinoctialis).

The Pelagornithidae had extremely thin-walled bones widely pneumatized with the air sac extensions of the lungs. Most limb bone fossils are very much crushed for that reason. In life, the thin bones and extensive pneumatization enabled the birds to achieve large size while remaining below critical wing loadings. Though 25 kg/m^{2} (5 lb/ft^{2}) is regarded as the maximum wing loading for powered bird flight, there is evidence that bony-toothed birds used dynamic soaring flight almost exclusively: the proximal end of the humerus had an elongated diagonal shape that could hardly have allowed for the movement necessary for the typical flapping flight of birds; their weight thus cannot be easily estimated. The attachment positions for the muscles responsible for holding the upper arm straightly outstretched were particularly well-developed, and altogether the anatomy seems to allow for an ability of holding the wings rigidly at the glenoid joint unmatched by any other known bird. This is especially prominent in the Neogene pelagornithids, and less developed in the older Paleogene forms. The sternum had the deep and short shape typical of dynamic soarers, and bony outgrowths at the keel's forward margin securely anchored the furcula.

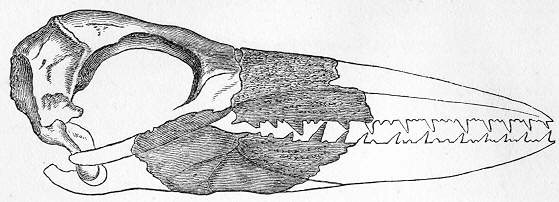
Skull of Odontopteryx toliapica (white areas are restored). Unlike in other pseudotooth birds, the "teeth" in this genus were slanted forwards.

The legs were proportionally short, the feet probably webbed and the hallux was vestigial or entirely absent; the tarsometatarsi (anklebones) resembled those of albatrosses while the arrangement of the front toes was more like in fulmars. Typical for pseudotooth birds was a second toe that attached a bit kneewards from the others and was noticeably angled outwards. The "teeth" were probably covered by the rhamphotheca in life, and there are two furrows running along the underside of the upper bill just inside the ridges which bore the "teeth". Thus, when the bill was closed only the upper jaw's "teeth" were visible, with the lower ones hidden behind them. Inside the eye sockets of at least some pseudotooth birds – perhaps only in the younger species – were well-developed salt glands.

Altogether, almost no major body part of pelagornithids is known from a well-preserved associated fossil and most well-preserved material consists of single bones only; on the other hand the long occurrence and large size makes for a few rather comprehensive (though much crushed and distorted) remains of individual birds that were entombed by as they lay dead, complete with some fossilized feathers. Large parts of the skull and some beak pieces are found not too infrequently. In February 2009, an almost-complete fossilized skull of a presumed Odontopteryx from around the Chasicoan-Huayquerian boundary c. 9 million years ago (Ma) was unveiled in Lima. It had been found a few months earlier in Ocucaje District of Ica Province, Peru. According to paleontologist Mario Urbina, who discovered the specimen, and his colleagues Rodolfo Salas, Ken Campbell and Daniel T. Ksepka, the Ocucaje skull is the best-preserved pelagornithid cranium known as of 2009.

=== Ecology and extinction ===
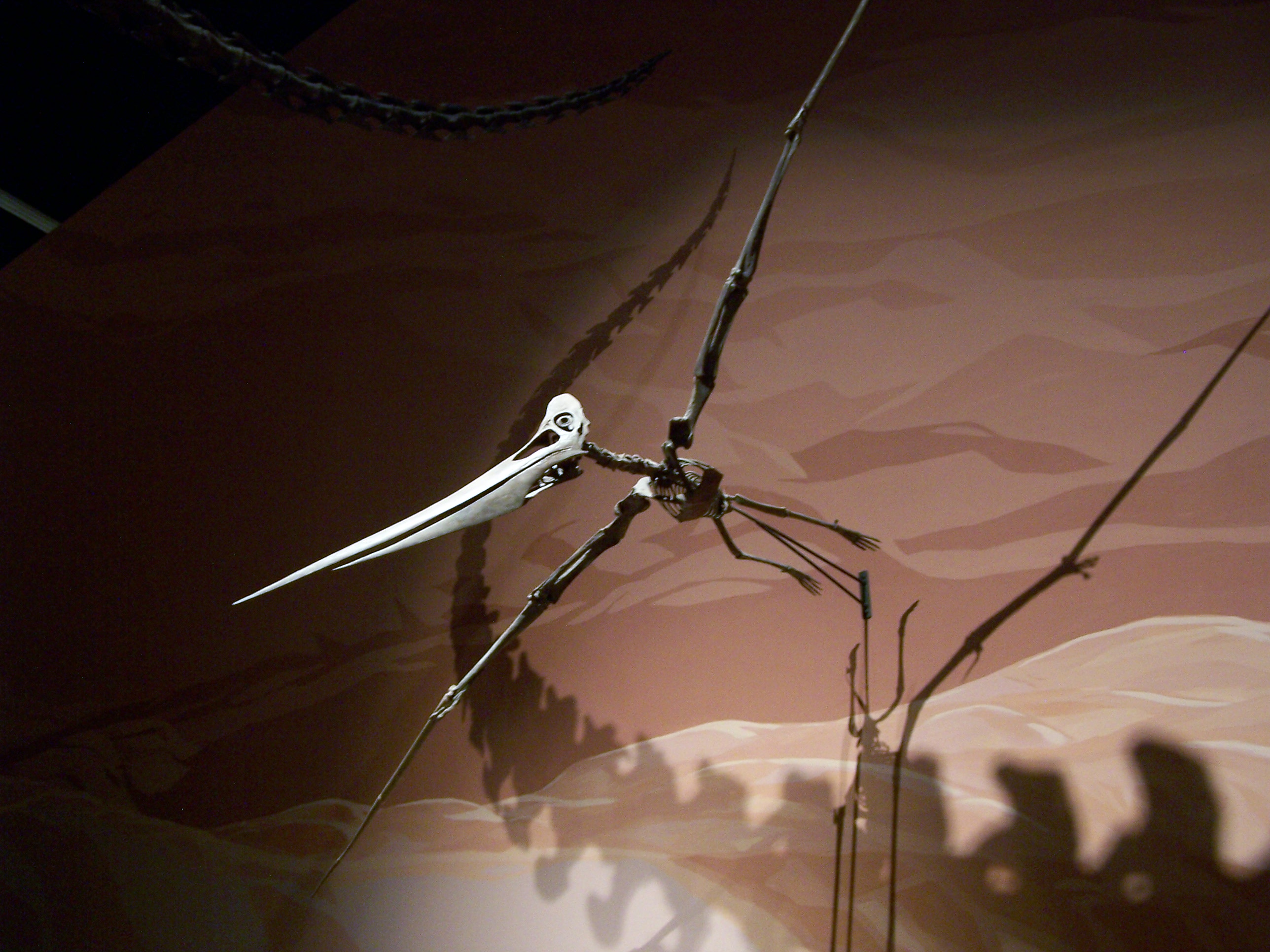
Pteranodon skeleton. A toothless Late Cretaceous pterosaur, it was similar to Pelagornis in size and proportions and possibly in feeding habits.

Unlike the true teeth of Mesozoic stem-birds like Archaeopteryx or Ichthyornis, the pseudoteeth of the pelagornithids do not seem to have had serrated or otherwise specialized cutting edges, and were useful to hold prey for swallowing whole rather than to tear bits off it. Since the teeth were hollow or at best full of cancellous bone and are easily worn or broken off in fossils, it is surmised they were not extremely resilient in life either. Pelagornithid prey would thus have been soft-bodied, and have encompassed mainly cephalopods and soft-skinned fishes. Prey items may have reached considerable size. Though some reconstructions show pelagornithids as diving birds in the manner of gannets, the thin-walled highly pneumatized bones which must have fractured easily judging from the state of fossil specimens make such a mode of feeding unlikely, if not outright dangerous. Rather, prey would have been picked up from immediately below the ocean surface while the birds were flying or swimming, and they probably submerged only the beak in most situations. Their quadrate bone articulation with the lower jaw resembled that of a pelican or other birds that can open their beak widely. Altogether, the pseudotooth birds would have filled an ecological niche almost identical to that of the larger fish-eating pteranodontian pterosaurs, whose extinction at the end of the Cretaceous may well have paved the way for the highly successful 50-million-year reign of the Pelagornithidae. Like them as well as modern albatrosses, the pseudotooth birds could have used the system of ocean currents and atmospheric circulation to take round-track routes soaring over the open oceans, returning to breed only every few years. Unlike albatrosses today, which avoid the tropical equatorial currents with their doldrums, Pelagornithidae were found in all sorts of climates, and records from around 40 Ma stretch from Belgium through Togo to the Antarctic. It is conspicuous that penguins and plotopterids – both wing-propelled divers that foraged over the continental shelf – are almost invariably found in the company of pseudotooth birds. Thus, pseudotooth birds seem to have gathered in some numbers in upwelling regions, presumably to feed but perhaps also to breed nearby.

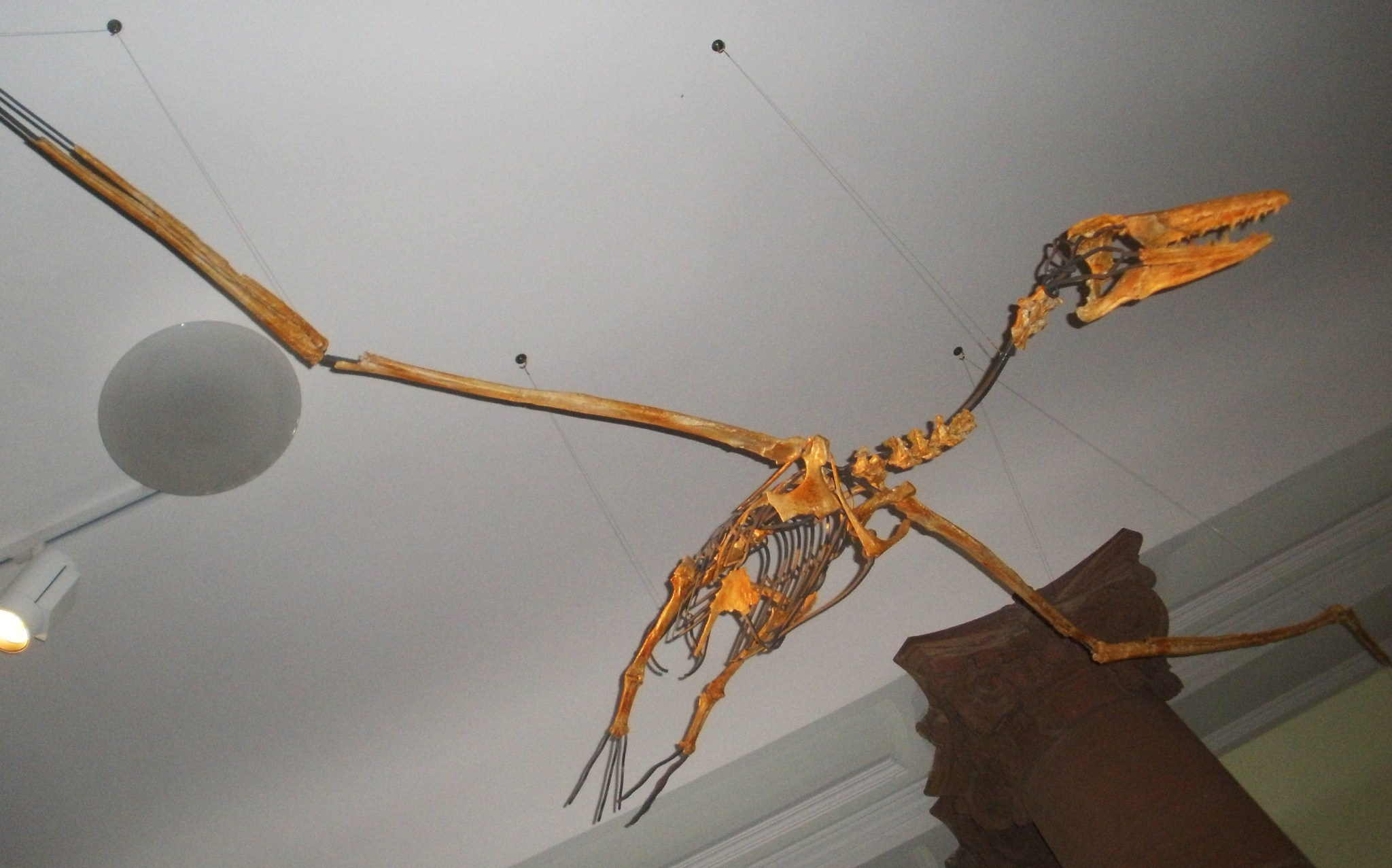
Pelagornis chilensis skeleton seen from below

It is sometimes claimed that as with some other seabirds (e.g. the flightless Plotopteridae), the evolutionary radiation of cetaceans and pinnipeds outcompeted the pseudotooth birds and drove them into extinction. While this may be correct for the plotopterids, for pelagornithids it is not so likely for two reasons: First, the Pelagornithidae continued to thrive for 10 million years after modern-type baleen whales evolved, and in the Middle Miocene Pelagornis coexisted with Aglaocetus and Harrison's whale (Eobalaenoptera harrisoni) in the Atlantic off the Eastern Seaboard, while the Pacific Osteodontornis inhabited the same seas as Balaenula and Morenocetus; the ancestral smallish sperm whale genus Aulophyseter (and/or Orycterocetus) occurred in both Northern Hemisphere oceans at that time, while the mid-sized sperm whale Brygmophyseter roamed the North Pacific. As regards Miocene pinnipeds, a diversity of ancient walruses and ancestral fur seals like Thalassoleon inhabited the north-east, while the basal monachine seal Acrophoca was present in the south-east Pacific. Secondly, pinnipeds are limited to near-shore waters while pseudotooth birds roamed the seas far and wide, like large cetaceans, and like all big carnivores all three groups were K-strategists with moderate to very low population densities.

Thus, direct competition for food between bony-toothed birds and cetaceans or pinnipeds cannot have been very severe. As both the birds and pinnipeds would need level ground near the sea to raise their young, competition for breeding grounds may have affected the birds' population. In that respect, the specializations for dynamic soaring restricted the number of possible nesting sites for the birds, but on the other hand upland on islands or in coastal ranges could have provided breeding grounds for Pelagornithidae that was inaccessible for pinnipeds; just as many albatrosses today nest in the uplands of islands (e.g. the Galápagos or Torishima). The bony-toothed birds probably required strong updrafts for takeoff and would have preferred higher sites anyway for this reason, rendering competition with pinniped rookeries quite minimal. As regards breeding grounds, giant eggshell fragments from the Famara mountains on Lanzarote, Canary Islands, were tentatively attributed to Late Miocene pseudotooth birds. As regards the Ypresian London Clay of the Isle of Sheppey, wherein pelagornithid fossils are not infrequently found, it was deposited in a shallow epicontinental sea during a very hot time with high sea levels. The presumed breeding sites cannot have been as far offshore as many seabird rookeries are today, as the region was hemmed in between the Alps and the Grampian and Scandinavian Mountains, in a sea less wide than the Caribbean is today.

Neogene pseudotooth birds are common along the America coasts near the Appalachian and Cordilleran mountains, and these species thus presumably also bred not far offshore or even in the mountains themselves. In that respect the presence of medullary bone in the specimens from Lee Creek Mine in North Carolina, United States, is notable, as among birds this is generally only found in laying females, indicating that the breeding grounds were probably not far away. At least Pacific islands of volcanic origin would be eroded away in the last millions of years however, obliterating any remains of pelagornithid breeding colonies that might have once existed in the open ocean. Necker Island for example was of significant size 10 million years ago, when Osteodontornis roamed the Pacific.

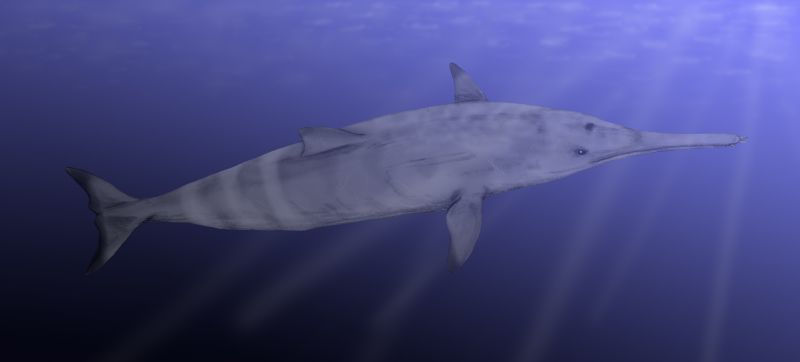
Squalodon calvertensis, a shark-toothed whale from the Middle Miocene

There is no obvious single reason for the pseudotooth birds' extinction. A scenario of general ecological change – exacerbated by the beginning ice age and changes in ocean currents due to plate tectonic shifts (e.g. the emergence of the Antarctic circumpolar current or the closing of the Isthmus of Panama) – is more likely, with the pseudotooth birds as remnants of the world's Paleogene fauna ultimately failing to adapt. In that respect it may be significant that some lineages of cetaceans, like the primitive dolphins of the Kentriodontidae or the shark-toothed whales, flourished contemporary with the Pelagornithidae and became extinct at about the same time. Also, the modern diversity of pinniped and cetacean genera evolved largely around the Mio-Pliocene boundary, suggesting that many ecological niches emerged or became vacant. In addition, whatever caused the Middle Miocene disruption and the Messinian Salinity Crisis did affect the trophic web of Earth's oceans not insignificantly either, and the latter event led to a widespread extinction of seabirds. Together, this combination of factors led to Neogene animals finally replacing the last remnants of the Paleogene fauna in the Pliocene. In that respect, it is conspicuous that the older pseudotooth birds are typically found in the same deposits as plotopterids and penguins, while younger forms were sympatric with auks, albatrosses, penguins and Procellariidae – which, however, underwent an adaptive radiation of considerable extent coincident (and probably caused by) with the final demise of the Paleogene-type trophic web. Although the fossil record is necessarily incomplete, as it seems cormorants and seagulls were very rarely found in association with the Pelagornithidae.

Irrespective of the cause of their ultimate extinction, during the long time of their existence the pseudotooth birds furnished prey for large predators themselves. Few if any birds that coexisted with them were large enough to harm them while airborne; as evidenced by the Early Eocene Limnofregata, the frigatebirds coevolved with the Pelagornithidae and may well have harassed any of the small species for food on occasion, as they today harass albatrosses. From the Middle Miocene or Early Pliocene of the Lee Creek Mine, some remains of pseudotooth birds which probably fell victim to sharks while feeding are known. The large members of the abundant Lee Creek Mine shark fauna that hunted near the water's surface included the broadnose sevengill shark (Notorynchus cepedianus), Carcharias sand tiger sharks, Isurus and Cosmopolitodus mako sharks, Carcharodon white sharks, the snaggletooth shark Hemipristis serra, tiger sharks (Galeocerdo), Carcharhinus whaler sharks, the lemon shark (Negaprion brevirostris) and hammerhead sharks (Sphyrna), and perhaps (depending on the bird fossils' age) also Pristis sawfishes, Odontaspis sand tiger sharks, and Lamna and Parotodus benedeni mackerel sharks. It is notable that fossils of smaller diving birds – for example auks, loons and cormorants – as well as those of albatrosses are much more commonly found in those shark pellets than pseudotooth birds, supporting the assumption that the latter had quite low population densities and caught much of their food in mid-flight.

A study on Pelagornis' flight performance suggests that, unlike modern seabirds, it relied on thermal soaring much like continental soaring birds and Pteranodon.

=== External appearance ===
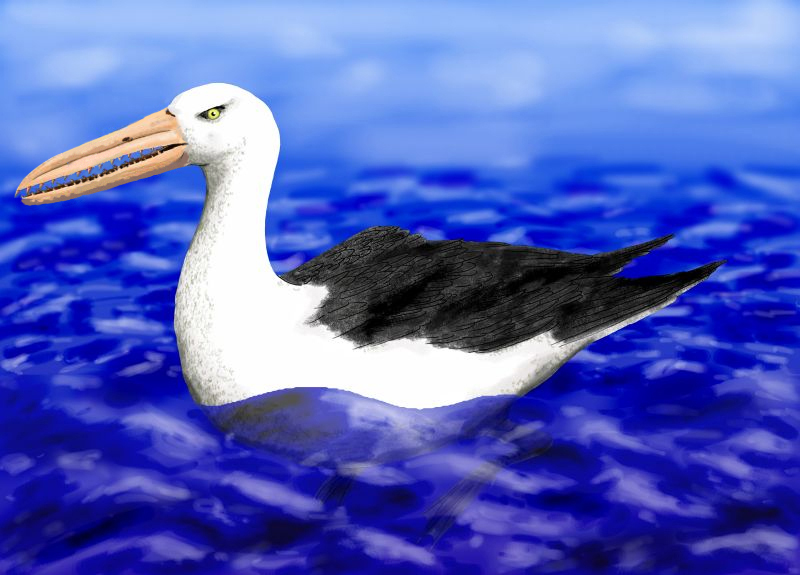
A generic reconstruction of Osteodontornis

Nothing is known for sure about the colouration of these birds, as they left no living descendants. But some inferences can be made based on their phylogeny: if they were a member of the "higher waterbird" group (see below), they most probably had a plumage similar to that depicted in the reconstruction of Osteodontornis orri – Procellariiformes and Pelecaniformes in the modern sense (or Ciconiiformes, if Pelecaniformes are merged there) have hardly any carotenoid or structural colors at all in their plumage, and generally lack even phaeomelanins. Thus, the only colours commonly found in these birds are black, white and various shades of grey. Some have patches of iridescent feathers, or brownish or reddish hues, but these are rare and limited in extent, and those species in which they are found (e.g. bitterns, ibises or the hammerkop) are generally only found in freshwater habitat.

If the pseudotooth birds are Galloanseres, phaeomelanins might be more likely to have occurred in their feathers, but it is notable that the most basal lineages of Anseriformes are typically grey-and-black or black-and-white. Among ocean-going birds in general, the upperside tends to be much darker than the underside (including the underwings) – though some petrels are dark grey all over, a combination of more or less dark grey upperside and white underside and (usually) head is a widespread colouration found in seabirds and may either be plesiomorphic for "higher waterbirds" or, perhaps more likely, be an adaptation to provide camouflage, in particular against being silhouetted against the sky if seen by prey in the sea. It is notable that at least the primary remiges, and often the other flight feathers too, are typically black in birds – even if the entire remaining plumage is completely white, as in some pelicans or in the Bali starling (Leucopsar rothschildi). This is due to the fact that melanins will polymerize, making all-black feathers very robust; as the largest forces encountered by bird feathers affect the flight feathers, the large amount of melanin gives them better resistance against being damaged in flight. In soaring birds as dependent on strong winds as the bony-toothed birds were, black wingtips and perhaps tails can be expected to have been present.

As regards the bare parts, all the presumed close relatives of the Pelagornithidae quite often have rather bright reddish colours, in particular on the bill. The phylogenetic uncertainties surrounding them do not allow to infer whether the bony-toothed birds had a throat sac similar to pelicans. If they did, it was probably red or orange, and may have been used in mating displays. Sexual dimorphism was probably almost nonexistent, as it typically is among the basal Anseriformes and the "higher waterbirds".

== Taxonomy, systematics and evolution ==
The name "pseudodontorns" refers to the genus Pseudodontornis, which for some time served as the family's namesake. However, the presently used name Pelagornithidae pre-dates Pseudodontornithidae, and thus modern authors generally prefer "pelagornithids" over "pseudodontorns". The latter name is generally found in mid-20th-century literature however.

Historically, the disparate bones of the pseudotooth birds were spread across six groups: a number of genera described from leg bones was placed in a family Cyphornithidae, and considered close allies of the pelican family (Pelecanidae). They were united with the latter in a superfamily Pelecanides in suborder Pelecanae, or later on (after the endings of taxonomic ranks were fixed to today's standard) Pelecanoidea in suborder Pelecani. Subsequently, some allied them with the entirely spurious "family" "Cladornithidae" in a "pelecaniform" suborder "Cladornithes". Those genera known from skull material were typically assigned to one or two families (Odontopterygidae and sometimes also Pseudodontornithidae) in a "pelecaniform" suborder Odontopteryges or Odontopterygia. Pelagornis meanwhile, described from wing bones, was traditionally placed in a monotypic "pelecaniform" family Pelagornithidae. This was often assigned either to the gannet and cormorant suborder Sulae (which was formerly treated as superfamily Sulides in suborder Pelecanae), or to the Odontopterygia. The sternum of Gigantornis was placed in the albatross family (Diomedeidae) in the order of tube-nosed seabirds (Procellariiformes).

The most extensive taxonomic and systematic confusion affected Dasornis. That genus was established based on a huge skull piece, which for long was placed in the Gastornithidae merely due to its size. Argillornis – nowadays recognized to belong in Dasornis – was described from wing bones, and generally included in the Sulae as part of the "Elopterygidae" – yet another invalid "family", and its type genus is generally not considered a modern-type bird by current authors. Some additional tarsometatarsus (ankle) bone fragments were placed in the genus Neptuniavis and assigned to the Procellariidae in the Procellariiformes. All these remains were only shown to belong in the pseudotooth bird genus Dasornis in 2008.

The most basal known pelagornithid is Protodontopteryx.

=== Systematics and phylogeny ===
The systematics of bony-toothed birds are subject of considerable debate. Initially, they were allied with the (then-polyphyletic) "Pelecaniformes" (pelicans and presumed allies, such as gannets and frigatebirds) and the Procellariiformes (tube-nosed seabirds like albatrosses and petrels), because of their similar general anatomy. Some of the first remains of the massive Dasornis were mistaken for a ratite and later a gastornithid. They were even used to argue for a close relationship between these two groups – and indeed, the pelicans and tubenoses, as well as for example the other "Pelecaniformes" (cormorants and allies) which are preferably separated as Phalacrocoraciformes nowadays, the Ciconiiformes (storks and/or either herons and ibises or the "core" Pelecaniformes) and Gaviiformes (loons/divers) seem to make up a radiation, possibly a clade, of "higher waterbirds". However, the Pelagornithidae are not generally held to be a missing link between pelicans and albatrosses anymore, but if anything much closer to the former and only convergent to the latter in ecomorphology.

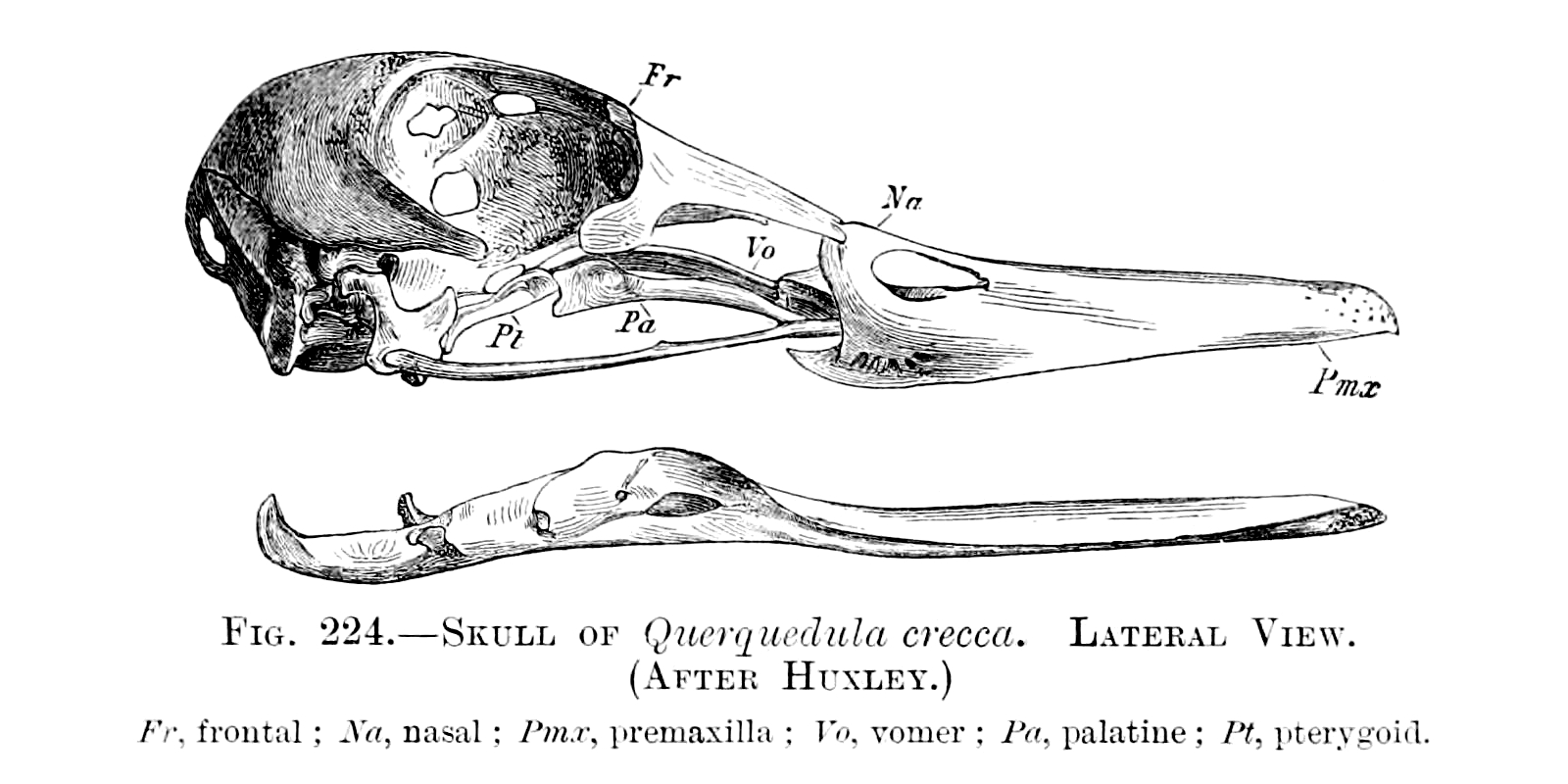
Eurasian teal (Anas crecca) skull. As typical for Galloanserae, the palatine bone ("Pa") is not expanded downwards.

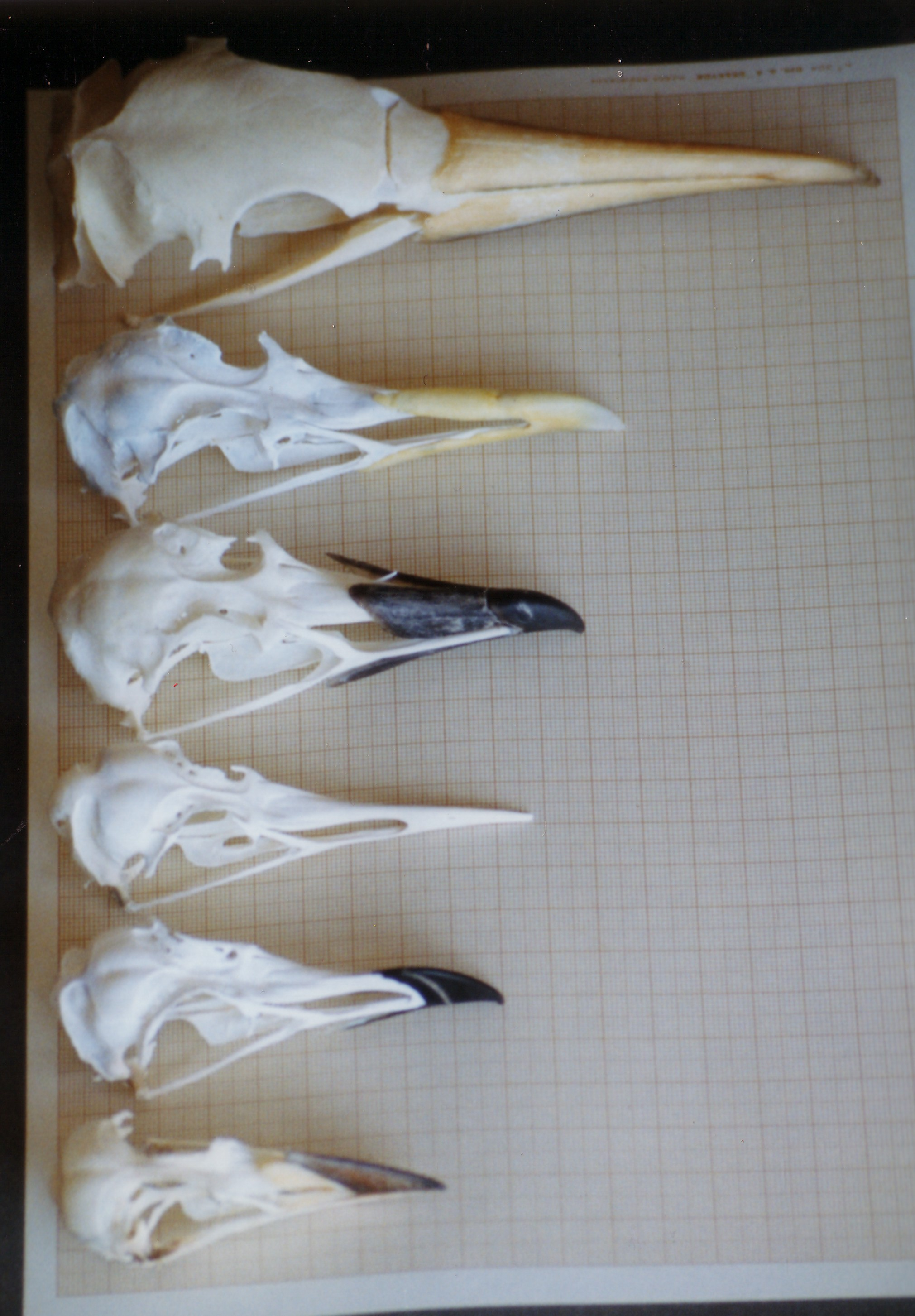
Skulls of a northern gannet (Morus bassanus, top) and various Charadriiformes (below). Note the expansion of the palatine bone visible inside the eye sockets in these Neoaves. Note also the supraorbital salt gland impressions of the Charadriiformes.

In 2005, a cladistic analysis proposed a close relationship between pseudotooth birds and waterfowl (Anseriformes). These are not part of the "higher waterbirds" but of the Galloanserae, a basal lineage of neognath birds. Some features, mainly of the skull, support this hypothesis. For example, the pelagornithids lack a crest on the underside of the palatine bone, while the Neoaves – the sister clade of the Galloanserae which includes the "higher waterbirds" and the "higher landbirds" – have such a crest. Also, like ducks, geese and swans pelagornithids only have two and not three condyles on the mandibular process of the quadrate bone, with the middle condyle beakwards of the side condyle. Their basipterygoid articulation is similar to that of the Galloanseres. At the side of the parasphenoid lamina, there is a wide platform as in Anseriformes. The bony-toothed birds' attachment of the coronoideal part of the external mandible adductor muscles was located at the midline, the rostropterygoid process had a support at its base and the mesethmoid bone had a deep depression for the caudal concha, just as in waterfowl.

As regards other parts of the skeleton, the proposed synapomorphies of pelagornithids and waterfowl are found mainly in the arm- and handbones: the ulna had a strongly convex upper backside at its elbow end – at the handward end of which the scapulotricipital muscles attached –, a point-tipped dorsal cotyle and only a shallow depression to house the meniscus between ulna and radius; towards the elbow, the intercondylar sulcus of the ulna becomes wide and is bordered by a long winding ridge on the belly side. The radius, meanwhile, has a convex ventral border to the humeral cotyle, which prominently continues the hind edge of the knob where the biceps brachii muscle attaches; towards the upper side of the radius bone the surface becomes flat and triangular handwards of the articular surface for the ulna. The carpometacarpus of both Anseriformes and pseudotooth birds has a prominent pisiform process, which extends from the carpal trochlea far fingerwards along the bone's forward side. On the carpometacarpus' underside, there is a long but narrow symphysis of the distal metacarpals, with the large metacarpal bone having a mid-ridge that at its outer end curves tailwards, and the thumb joint has a well-developed knob on the hind side of its articular surface. The leg and foot bones, as is to be expected from birds not as specialized for swimming as waterfowl are, show less similarities between Anseriformes and pseudotooth birds: on the tibiotarsus there is a wide incision between the condyles and the middle condyle is narrower than the side condyle and protrudes forwards; the tarsometatarsus has a low distal vascular foramen with recessed opening on its plantar surface and a middle toe trochlea that is elongated, slightly oblique, projects to the underside of the foot and is pointed at the tip.

It is unclear what to make of these apomorphies supposedly uniting Anseriformes and bony-toothed birds, for on the other hand, the sternum, distal humerus, leg and foot bones of pelagornithids seem to show apomorphies typical of "higher waterbirds". While details of the braincase bones are held to be very informative phylogenetically, the skull features in which the two groups are similar are generally related to the point where the bill attaches to the skull, and thus might have been subject to the selective forces brought about by skimming food from the upper water layer. The apparent non-neoavian traits distinguishing pelagornithids could just as well be retained or atavistic plesiomorphies; as the "higher waterbirds" are very ancient Neoaves and none of the suspected basal members of their radiation (see also "Graculavidae") were included in the analysis, it is not known for sure when the derived conditions typical of modern Neoaves were acquired. Footbone traits are notoriously prone to selection forces in birds, with convergent evolution known to inhibit or even invalidate cladistic analyses; however, the apparent autapomorphies of the lower arm and hand bones are hard to explain by anything else than an actual relationship. The location of the salt glands inside the eye sockets of Osteodontornis, Pelagornis (and probably others) shows that whatever their relationships were, the pelagornithids adapted to an oceanic habitat independently from penguins and tubenoses, which instead have supraorbital salt glands. Their missing or vestigial hallux – like in ducks but unlike in pelicans which have all four toes fully developed and webbed – was held against a close relationship with pelicans. But as is known today, pelicans are closer to storks (which have a hallux but no webbing) than to pseudotooth birds and evolved their fully webbed toes independently. With both a webbed and a hypotrophied hallux being apomorphic and paraphyletic, its absence in pseudotooth birds does not provide much information on their relationship.

While giant Galloanserae were common and diverse in the Paleogene in particular, these (Gastornis and mihirungs) were flightless terrestrial birds; it is perhaps significant though that the only other "bone-toothed" birds known so far are the two species of the moa-nalo genus Thambetochen, extinct giant flightless dabbling ducks from the Hawaiian Islands. In any case, the 2005 cladistic analysis uses a representative sample of Procellariiformes and recovers them as strongly supported clade in agreement with the current consensus. The presumed close relationship between bony-toothed birds and tubenoses can thus be disregarded after all. As regards "Pelecaniformes", the analysis does not recover the correct phylogeny and does not include the shoebill (Balaeniceps rex, a "missing link" between pelicans and storks) either; clearly, the adaptive radiation of the pelican-stork lineage is misleading the analysis here. In addition, the Galloanserae are not recovered as monophyletic. In 2007, a far more comprehensive cladistic analysis of bird anatomy including some fossil forms (though not the crucial Late Cretaceous taxa, which are usually known only from fragmentary remains) resolved the "higher waterbird" radiation somewhat better; still, the problem of leg and foot traits confounding the analysis was noticeable.

As their relationships are still unresolved between Galloanserae and "higher waterbirds", the pseudotooth birds are here placed in the distinct order Odontopterygiformes as a compromise, rather than in a pelecaniform/ciconiiform or anseriform suborder Odontopterygia or even a family of the Anseriformes, Ciconiiformes or Pelecaniformes. Such a treatment is unlikely to be completely wrong in either case, as the pseudotooth birds are well distinct from the Presbyornithidae and Scopidae, today generally regarded as the very basal divergences of, respectively, the Anseriformes and the pelican-stork group. It also provides leeway should the proposed separation of the Pelagornithidae into several families turn out to be appropriate. It is perhaps notable that when Boris Spulski established the Odontopterygia in 1910, he did this partly because he noted some of the similarities between pseudotooth birds and waterfowl listed above. Dasornis was long mistaken for a gastornithid, now strongly suspected to be very close indeed to the Anseriformes. Also, the pelagornithid Palaeochenoides mioceanus was initially mistaken for an anseriform, and the same might hold true for the supposed Oligocene swan Guguschia nailiae. In the former case, however, a "much the more convincing" analysis for a placement outside the Galloanseres was published the year after its description already. Most unrecognised pelagornithid bones were initially assigned to "higher waterbird" families however, typically to the (then-paraphyletic) "Pelecaniformes", but in particular the tarsometatarsus was typically mistaken for that of a procellariiform. The Odontopterygiformes were first proposed when Osteodontornis was described from the first – and still the only known – reasonably complete skeleton of one of these birds. Hildegarde Howard found that, no matter that some of its features resembled other birds, the combination was quite unlike any neognath known.

While the authors claim it is beyond the paper's scope, the study describing Protodontopteryx suggests that the proposed pro-galloansere traits might actually be plesiomorphic in relation to Aves. It also notes "striking" similarities between pelagornithids and Ichthyornis in terms of jaw anatomy, but still classifies them as neognaths due to the well-developed hypotarsal crests, a supratendineal bridge on the distal tibiotarsus and the caudally closed ilioischiadic foramen. The actual phylogenetic tree depicts them in a polytomy with both Galloanserae and Neoaves.

It has been suggested at times that the "teeth" of pelagornithids were homologous with true teeth on an at least molecular level, being derived from the same programs responsible for the formation of teeth in other dinosaurs. This might have an importance to their actual phylogenetic position.

A 2022 paper described Janavis, an ichthyornithine (advanced stem-bird) with a pterygoid bone similar to that of galloanserans. This implies that a galloanseran-like pterygoid is ancestral for crown-group birds as a whole, rather than a derived feature of neognaths. The authors noted that among the groups often regarded as galloanserans based on their pterygoid morphology (pelagornithids, dromornithids and gastornithids), some might instead constitute early-diverging crown-birds outside Galloanserae, or even be outside the avian crown group altogether.

=== Genera and unidentified specimens ===
Due to the fragmented and crushed state of most pseudotooth bird remains, it is not clear whether the roughly one dozen genera that have been named are all valid. Only the beaks are robust and distinctive enough to allow for good taxonomic delimitation, and even these are usually found as broken pieces. For example, Argilliornis and Neptuniavis were recently found to be arm and leg bones, respectively, of Dasornis, which until then was only known from skull bones. Size is generally regarded as reliable marker for generic diversity, but care just be taken to ascertain whether smallish specimens are not from young birds.

Tentatively, the following genera are recognized:

- Protodontopteryx (Early Paleocene of New Zealand)
- Pseudodontornis (Late Paleocene ?–? Late Oligocene of Charleston, South Carolina, US) – polyphyletic (type species in Palaeochenoides/Pelagornis)?
- "Odontoptila" (Late Paleocene/Early Eocene of Ouled Abdoun Basin, Morocco) – a nomen nudum; preoccupied
- Odontopteryx (Late Paleocene/Early Eocene of Ouled Abdoun Basin, Morocco – Middle Eocene of Uzbekistan) – including "Neptuniavis" minor, may include "Pseudodontornis" longidentata, "P." tschulensis and Macrodontopteryx
- Dasornis (London Clay Early Eocene of Isle of Sheppey, England) – including Argillornis, "Lithornis" emuinus and "Neptuniavis" miranda; may include "Odontopteryx gigas" (a nomen nudum), "Pseudodontornis" longidentata and Gigantornis
- Macrodontopteryx (London Clay Early Eocene of England) – may include "Pseudodontornis" longidentata and/or belong in Odontopteryx
- cf. Odontopteryx (Early Eocene of Virginia, US)
- Gigantornis (Ameki Middle Eocene of Ameki, Nigeria) – may belong in Dasornis
- cf. Odontopteryx (Middle Eocene of Mexico)
- Pelagornithidae gen. et sp. indet. (Middle Eocene of Mount Discovery, Antarctica) – same as large Seymour Island specimen/Dasornis/Gigantornis?
- Pelagornithidae gen. et sp. indet. (Middle Eocene of Etterbeek, Belgium) – Dasornis/Macrodontopteryx?
- "Aequornis" (Middle Eocene of Kpogamé-Hahotoé, Togo) – a nomen nudum
- Pelagornithidae gen. et spp. indet. (La Meseta Middle/Late Eocene of Seymour Island, Antarctica) – two species? Same as Mount Discovery specimen/Dasornis/Gigantornis, Odontopteryx?
- Pelagornithidae gen. et sp. indet. (Late Eocene of France)
- Pelagornithidae gen. et sp. indet. (Late Eocene of Kazakhstan) – may belong in Zheroia
- Pelagornithidae gen. et sp. indet. (Eocene of South Shetland Islands, South Atlantic)
- cf. Dasornis (Late Eocene/Early Oligocene of Oregon, US) – Cyphornis?
- cf. Macrodontopteryx (Early Oligocene of Hamstead, England) – may belong in Proceriavis
- Pelagornithidae gen. et sp. indet. (Early Oligocene of Japan)
- Caspiodontornis (Late Oligocene of Pirəkəşkül, Azerbaijan) – may belong in Guguschia
- Palaeochenoides (Late Oligocene of South Carolina, US) – may include Pseudodontornis longirostris or belong in Pelagornis
- Pelagornithidae gen. et sp. indet. (Late Oligocene of South Carolina, US)
- Pelagornithidae gen. et sp. indet. (Yamaga Late Oligocene of Kitakyushu, Japan) – Osteodontornis?
- Tympanonesiotes (Late Oligocene or Early Miocene of Cooper River, US)
- Cyphornis (Early Miocene of Carmanah Point, Vancouver Island, Canada) – may include Osteodontornis
- Osteodontornis (Early Miocene – Early Pliocene) – may belong in Cyphornis
- Pelagornis (Early Miocene of Armagnac, France – Early Pleistocene of Ahl al Oughlam, Morocco) – may include Pseudodontornis longirostris, Palaeochenoides
- Pelagornithidae gen. et spp. indet. (Early? Miocene – Early Pliocene of eastern US) – 2–3 species? Pelagornis?
- cf. Osteodontornis (Capadare Middle Miocene of Cueva del Zumbador, Venezuela)
- cf. Osteodontornis/Pelagornis (?Middle/Late Miocene of North Canterbury, New Zealand)
- cf. Pelagornis (Bahía Inglesa Middle Miocene of Chile – Early Pliocene of Chile and Peru) – 2 species?
- cf. Osteodontornis (Pisco Middle Miocene –? Early Pliocene of Peru) – 2 species?
- "Pseudodontornis" stirtoni (Miocene or Pliocene of Motunau Beach, New Zealand) – sometimes Neodontornis
- Pelagornithidae gen. et sp. indet. (Yushima Early Pliocene of Maesawa, Japan) – Osteodontornis?
- cf. "Pseudodontornis" stirtoni (Tangahoe Mudstone Middle Pliocene of Hawera New Zealand)
- Pelagornithidae gen. et sp. indet. (Dainichi Early Pleistocene of Kakegawa, Japan) – Osteodontornis?
- Pelagornis sp. (Late Pliocene of California, US: Boessenecker and Smith; 2011)

Some other Paleogene (and in one case possibly Late Cretaceous) birds, typically taxa known only from the most fragmentary remains, might also be pelagornithids. They are not usually placed here, but the fossils' large size and the known similarities of certain pseudotooth birds' bones to those of other lineages warrant further study. The genera in question are Laornis, Proceriavis, Manu and Protopelicanus.
