= Zvonimir Srna =

Croatian handball player (born 1998)

Personal information
- Nationality: Croatian
- Born: 18 January 1998 (age 28) Dubrovnik, Croatia
- Height: 2.02 m (6 ft 8 in)

Sport
- Sport: Handball
- Position: Left back
- Current club: Montpellier Handball
- Number: 11

Youth career
- Years: Team
- –2015: RK Dubrovnik

Senior clubs
- Years: Team
- 2015–2020: RK Dubrovnik
- 2/2022–8/2022: RK Zagreb
- 8/2022–9/2022: HRK Gorica
- 9/2022–2025: RK Zagreb
- 2025–: Montpellier Handball
National team
Years	Team	Apps	(Gls)
2020–	Croatia	54	(148)
Medal record
World Championship
Silver medal – second place	2025 Denmark/Norway/Croatia
European Championship
Bronze medal – third place	2026 Denmark/Norway/Sweden

Zvonimir Srna (born 18 January 1998) is a Croatian handball player for Montpellier Handball and the Croatian national team.

Srna started his career at his hometown club RK Dubrovnik. In February 2020 he joined Croatian top club RK Zagreb. In the 2020–21 season he joined HRK Gorica, but returned to RK Zagreb after only a month. Here he won the 2021, 2022, 2023, 2024 and 2025 Croatian Handball Premier League and Croatian Handball Cup.

In 2025 he joined French team Montpellier Handball. At Montpellier he has played mainly in defense.

== National team ==
At the 2022 European Men's Handball Championship he finished 8th with Croatia, playing three games and scoring four goals. At the 2023 World Men's Handball Championship he once again represented Croatia, where they finished 9th. Srna however only played 1 game, scoring a single goal.

He represented Croatia at the 2024 Olympics.

For the 2025 World Men's Handball Championship Srna had become a part of the Croatian first choice line-up, playing all 9 games and scoring 34 goals, when Croatia took silver medals.

At the 2026 European Men's Handball Championship he won bronze medals with Croatia, losing to Germany in the semifinal and beating Iceland in the third place playoff. He played 6 games, before an Adductor muscle injury forced him to leave the tournament.
