= Piña (disambiguation) =

Piña is a fiber made from the leaves of a pineapple.

Piña is also a Spanish word for a pineapple or pinecone.

Piña may also refer to:

== People ==
- John Piña Craven (1924–2015), United States Navy officer
- Piña (surname)

== Places ==
- Piña, Colón, an administrative division in Panama
- Elías Piña Province, in Dominican Republic
- Piña de Campos, town in Castile, Spain
- Piña de Esgueva, town in Castile, Spain

== Other uses ==
- The fruit of the blue agave used in the production of tequila
- Piña colada, a cocktail

== See also ==
- Pina (disambiguation)
- Pinas (disambiguation)
- Pena (disambiguation)
- Peña (disambiguation)
