= Estádio D. Afonso Henriques =

Football stadium in Guimarães, Portugal

Coordinates: 41°26′45″N 8°18′04″W

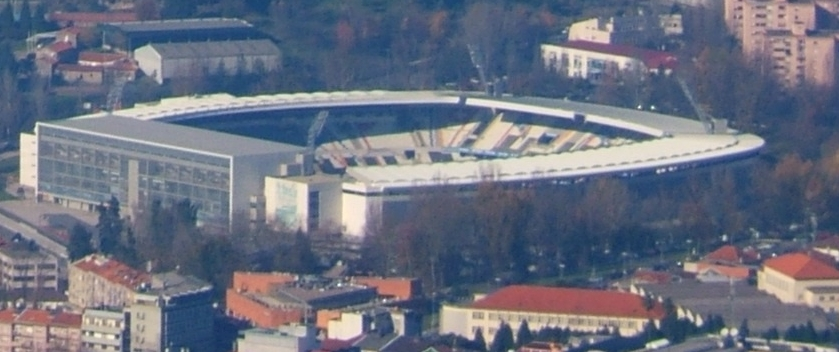
- Vitória Stadium from the summit of the Penha Mountain; UEFA
- Interactive map of Estádio D. Afonso Henriques
- Former names: Estádio Municipal de Guimarães
- Location: Rua de São Gonçalo, Guimarães, Portugal
- Owner: Vitória Sport Clube
- Capacity: 30,029
- Surface: Grass
- Record attendance: 30,000 (27 April 2008); Vitória S.C. 0–5 FC Porto
- Field size: 105 x 68 m

Construction
- Built: 1965; 61 years ago 2003; 23 years ago
- Opened: 3 January 1965; 25 July 2003
- Renovated: 11-03-2002 > 25-07-2003
- Expanded: 1991, 2003
- Cost: 8.500 contos €34.252 million
- Architect: Eduardo Guimarães

Tenants
- Vitória S.C. (1965–present); Portugal national football team (Selected Matches)

Website
- Vitória SC

The Estádio D. Afonso Henriques (English: D. Afonso Henriques Stadium) is a football stadium in the city of Guimarães, Portugal. The stadium is home of Guimarães's most successful team, Vitória de Guimarães, presently competing in the top-flight Portuguese Liga.

The stadium, formerly known as Estádio Municipal de Guimarães, was built in 1965 and was renovated and expanded in 2003 for the UEFA Euro 2004 tournament by architect Eduardo Guimarães for €34.252 million. Estádio D. Afonso Henriques has a capacity of 30,029 and it is named after the first King of Portugal—and also a Guimarães native—Afonso Henriques.

== History ==
After Campo da Atouguia, José Minotes, Perdiz, Benlhevai and Campo da Amorosa, Vitória had a new home. In 1962, a new competition was launched to create a new bench in the venue. Shortly after, around 2 years, the Portuguese Football Federation awarded 200 contos for laying grass in the stadium. Since the Federation required all first division clubs to play on a grass pitch, the Guimarães Municipal Stadium was inaugurated on 3 January 1965, before it was completed.

Located in the city center, it was Vitória SC's first stadium and built to replace the demolished "Campo da Amorosa" which was the club's home for around 20 years. With a capacity of 15,000 seats, the project cost around 8.500 contos. The inaugural game of the new stadium pitted Vitória SC against Os Belenenses for the Portuguese I Division, in which the Vitoria team won (2-1). In the 9th minute of the game, Vimaranense Albertino Castro, a player trained at the club's schools, scored the first goal on the new field. Inácio, in the final stretch of the match, scored the winning goal for the Victorians.

=== 1st Expansion ===
The stadium, which was owned by the Guimarães City Council, saw the Municipal Assembly vote in favor of the proposal to transfer the Estádio Municipal de Guimarães to the city's club, Vitória Sport Clube, on December 27, 1989. Thus, by public deed signed on September 21, 1990, the Council, through its president, declared that it would sell the stadium for the price of 1 million escudos, that is, 1,000 contos to be paid by Vitória.

The venue was one of the stadiums chosen to host tournament games for the 1991 U20 World Football Championship in Portugal and the stadium underwent its first major renovation with the construction and extension of the north stand and part of the east stand.

On 30 September 1995, a proposed methodology for choosing the new name of the Stadium was approved at the General Assembly. The members voted between two proposals, "Afonso Henriques" and "Vitória Sport Clube". In the first phase of the process, the names of Estádio da Amorosa and José Maria Castro Rodrigues were also proposed, which were later discarded. The proposal for D. Afonso Henriques in honor of Portugal's founder and first king, won with 453 votes, against 358.

=== 2nd Expansion ===
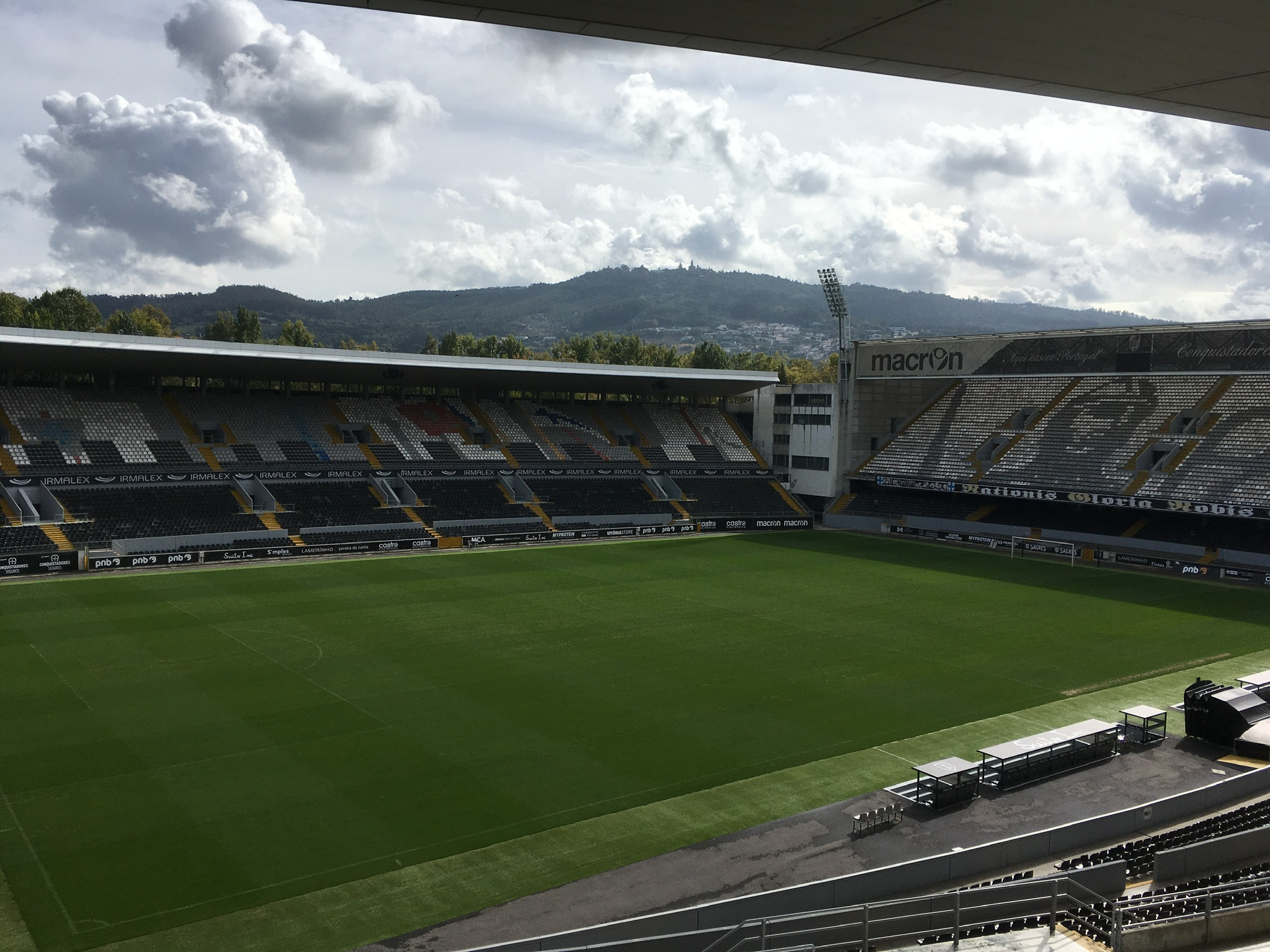
Stadium interior in 2018

In order to host games for Euro 2004, the D. Afonso Henriques Stadium underwent extensive renovation works between 2002 and 2003. The stands and other areas serving the public were remodeled to accommodate 30,000 spectators. The stadium was designed by local architect, Eduardo Guimarães, who enclosed the stadium with a new south stand that from the street resembled that of a building, giving homogeneity between the streets and the stadium with a green surrounding with living spaces and leisure and good accessibility.

The inauguration of the renovated stage took place on 25 July 2003, with a ceremony in which the President of the City Council handed over the venue to Vitória Sport Clube, still under the presidency of Pimenta Machado and already with the new name 'Estádio D. Afonso Henriques'. A crowd of 29,865 watched a multimedia show, followed by the game between Vitória SC and 1. FC Kaiserslautern, which the Conquerors won 4-1. Vitória's goal scorers of that match were Afonso Martins (who debuted the new venue), Nuno Assis, Rubens Júnior and Guga.

== Musical Events ==
The biggest musical event that this stage hosted was the 1st edition of the North Music Festival on 2 and 3 June 2017. This Portuguese Urban Festival is mostly made up of Portuguese artists, including Salvador Sobral, who won the Eurovision Song Contest 2017. The event had a total audience of around 16,000 people.

== Sports events ==
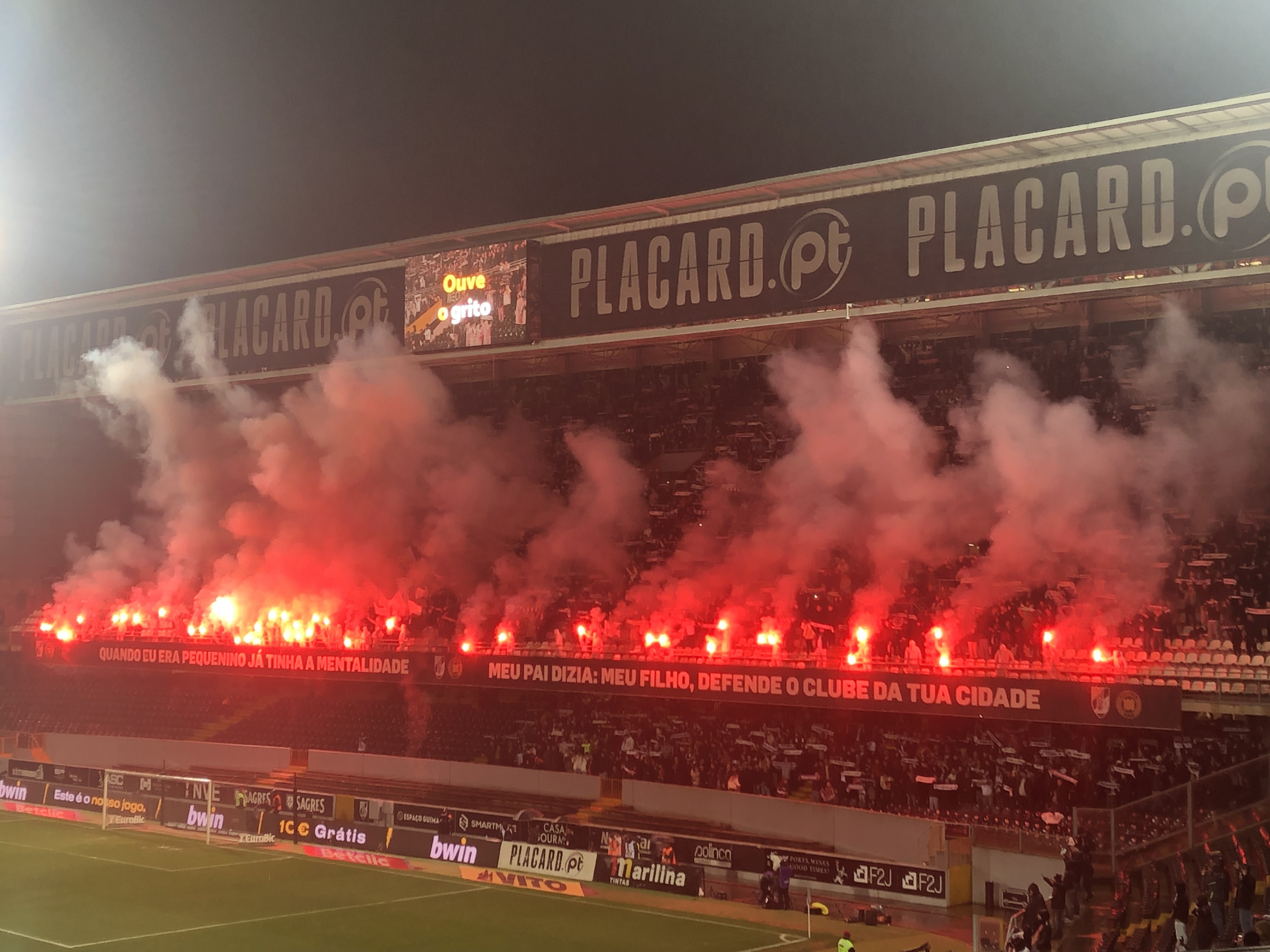
Vitória SC ultra stand in 2024

The Estádio D. Afonso Henriques hosted two games at UEFA Euro 2004. The opening fixture of Group C was between Denmark and Italy, in which the match ended 0–0. The last fixture of Group C was also played at the stadium, this time between Bulgaria and Italy, in which it ended 2–1 to Italy with goals from Martin Petrov for Bulgaria and goals from Simone Perrotta and Antonio Cassano for Italy. Although Cassano's 94th-minute strike won the game for Italy 2–1, in the other game between Denmark and Sweden, it ended 2–2 with a 89th-minute strike from Mattias Jonson. Jonson's goal resulted in Italy's exit out of the tournament on goals scored in third place, behind Sweden in second place and Denmark in first place.

Also during the 2006 UEFA European Under-21 Football Championship, the stadium hosted two of the tournament's matches.

In 2018, it hosted the match between Portugal x Poland, referring to the last game of Group 3 of League A of the first edition of the 2018–19 UEFA Nations League. The following year it served as the stage for two games in the Final Stage of the same competition.

=== 1991 FIFA World Youth (under-20) Championship ===
Date	Team #1	Result	Team #2	Round	Attendance
16 June 1991	Egypt	0–1	Soviet Union	Group C	5,680
20 June 1991	Australia	1–0	Egypt	Group C	8,800
20 June 1991	Trinidad and Tobago	0–4	Soviet Union	Group C	8,800
26 June 1991	Brazil	3–0	Soviet Union	Semi-Finals	22,000

=== UEFA Euro 2004 ===
The following UEFA Euro 2004 matches were held in the stadium.

Date	Team #1	Result	Team #2	Round	Attendance
14 June 2004	Denmark	0–0	Italy	Group C	29,595
22 June 2004	Italy	2–1	Bulgaria	Group C	16,002

=== 2006 UEFA European under-21 Championship ===
Date	Team #1	Result	Team #2	Round	Attendance
25 May 2006	France	3–0	Germany	Group A	8,023
28 May 2006	Germany	0–1	Portugal	Group A	28,174

=== 2019 UEFA Nations League Finals ===
One of the venues of the 2019 UEFA Nations League Finals.

Date	Team #1	Result	Team #2	Round	Attendance
6 June 2019	Netherlands	3–1 (a.e.t.)	England	Semi-Finals	25,711
9 June 2019	Switzerland	0–0 (a.e.t.) (5–6 p)	England	Third place play-off	15,742

=== Portugal national team matches ===
The following national team matches were held in the stadium.

#	Date	Score	Opponent	Competition	Attendance
1.	16 February 1983	0–3	France	Friendly	9,000
2.	26 March 1999	7–0	Azerbaijan	Euro 2000 qualifying	14,650
3.	6 September 2003	0–3	Spain	Friendly	21,176
4.	14 October 2009	4–0	Malta	2010 World Cup UEFA qualification	29,350
5.	3 September 2010	4–4	Cyprus	Euro 2012 qualifying	9,100
6.	6 February 2013	2–3	Ecuador	Friendly	20,286
7.	20 November 2018	1–1	Poland	2018–19 UEFA Nations League	29,917
8.	21 March 2024	5–2	Sweden	Friendly	27,532

=== Portugal women's national team matches ===
The following national team matches were held in the stadium.

#	Date	Score	Opponent	Competition	Attendance
1.	7 April 2023	1–2	Japan	Friendly	9,758
2.	11 April 2023	1–1	Wales	Friendly	11,055
3.	1 December 2026	–	Iceland	2027 World Cup UEFA play-offs	

== Incidents ==
The stadium witnessed the last smile before the collapse of S.L. Benfica player Miklós Fehér. This occurred during a league match between Vitória de Guimarães and Benfica on 25 January 2004. Late into the second half, Fehér received a yellow card shortly after coming on as a substitute. He then collapsed and went into cardiac arrest, later dying in hospital. Every time Benfica play in Guimarães, there is a remembrance ceremony at the location where Fehér collapsed.

Preceded by None	UEFA Nations League; Finals Venue; 2019 Estádio do Dragão; Estádio D. Afonso Henriques	Succeeded by 2021 San Siro Juventus Stadium
