= Penha =

Penha (Portuguese pronunciation: [ˈpeɲɐ], meaning cliff in the Portuguese language) may refer to:

== Places ==
=== In Brazil ===
- Penha, Santa Catarina, a municipality in Santa Catarina, Brazil
- Penha, Rio de Janeiro, a neighborhood in Rio de Janeiro, Brazil
- Penha Circular, a neighborhood in Rio de Janeiro, Brazil
- Subprefecture of Penha, São Paulo, Brazil
- Penha (district of São Paulo), Brazil

=== In China ===
- Penha Hill, a hill in Macau, China
  - Our Lady of Penha Chapel, Macau, a historic chapel on the hill.

=== In India ===
- Penha de França, Goa, a town in Bardez, Goa, India

=== In Portugal ===
- Monte da Penha, a peak in the city of Guimarães, Portugal
- Penha de França, a parish in the city of Lisbon, Portugal

== Other uses ==
- Penha Cable Car, a gondola lift in the city of Guimarães, Portugal
- Penha Convent in Vila Velha, Espírito Santo, Brazil
- Penha (São Paulo Metro)
- Penha Bus Company
