= Adductor =

Adductor may refer to:

- Adductor muscle (disambiguation)
- Adductor canal

== See also ==
- Adduction, a motion that pulls towards the midline of the body or limb
