= Peña Blanca =

Peña Blanca, Peñablanca, or Peñas Blancas may refer to:

- Peña Blanca, Guatemala, a village in the municipality of Camotan, Chiquimul
- Peña Blanca, New Mexico, United States
- Peña Blanca, Los Santos, Panama
- Peña Blanca, a mountain in Chile
- Peña Blanca Lake, Arizona, United States
- Peñablanca, Cagayan, Philippines
  - Peñablanca Protected Landscape and Seascape
- Peñablanca, community in Villa Alemana, Chile
- Peñas Blancas, a municipality in Río Negro Province, Argentina
- Peñas Blancas District, in San Ramón Canton, Costa Rica
- Peñas Blancas Massif Natural Reserve, Nicaragua

== See also ==
- Peña (disambiguation)
