= Pina =

Pina may refer to:

== People ==
- Pina (name), a list of people with the given name, nickname, surname or stage name

== Places ==
- Pina, Nepal, a village development committee
- Pina, Mallorca, Spain, a town
- Pina de Ebro, a municipality of the province of Zaragoza, Spain
- Pina de Montalgrao, Valencia, Spain, a municipality
- Pina (river), in southwestern Belarus

== Other uses ==
- 6521 Pina, a main-belt asteroid
- Pina (film), a 2011 German 3D documentary film about dance choreographer Pina Bausch
- Pina Records, a Puerto Rican record label
- Rosh Pina, an independent minyan in Washington, D.C., United States

== See also ==
- Piña (disambiguation)
- Pinas (disambiguation)
- Pena (disambiguation)
- Peña (disambiguation)
