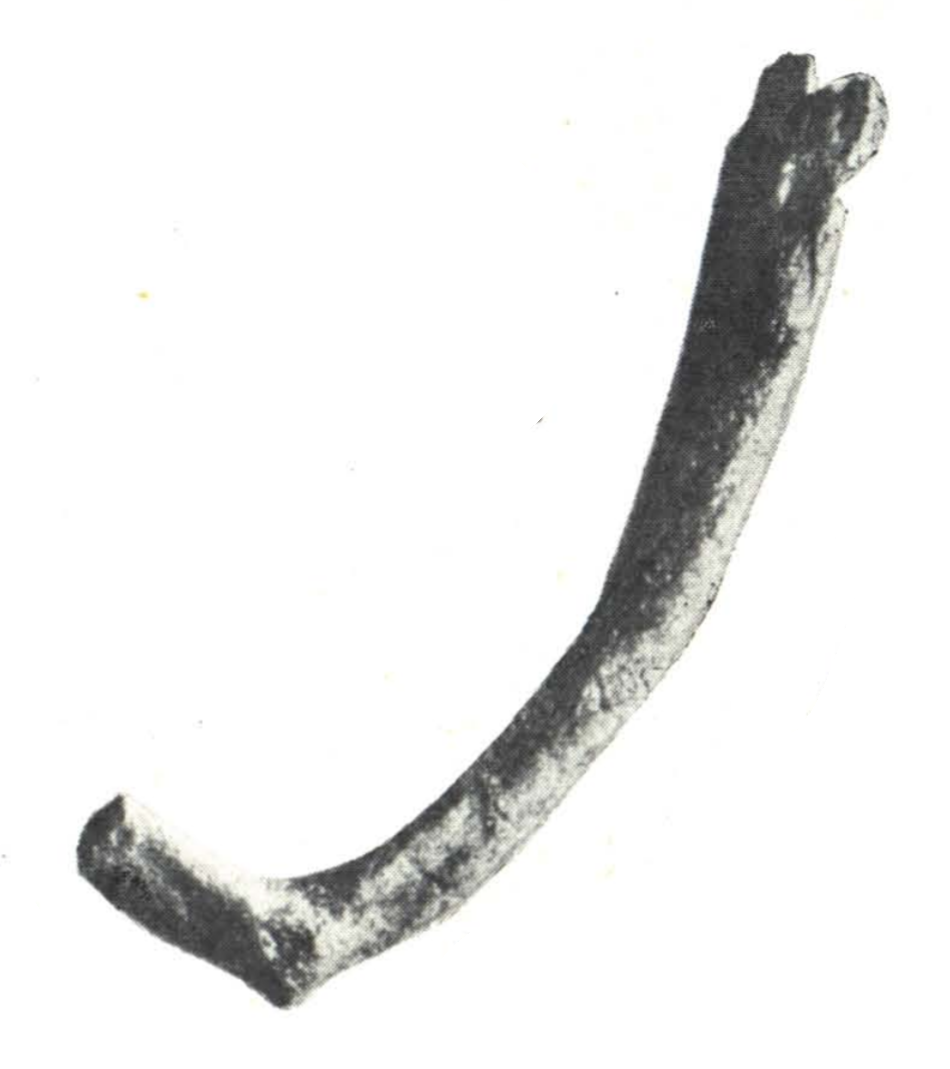
- Anterior view of the holotype furcula

Scientific classification
- Kingdom: Animalia
- Phylum: Chordata
- Class: Aves
- Infraclass: Neognathae
- Order: incertae sedis
- Genus: †Manu; Marples, 1946
- Species: †M. antiquus

Binomial name
- †Manu antiquus Marples, 1946

= Manu antiquus =

Manu antiquus Temporal range: Oligocene

Extinct genus of birds

Manu antiquus is a species of extinct bird of uncertain affinities from the Oligocene of New Zealand. It was described by Brian Marples in 1946 from fossil material (part of a furcula) found near Duntroon, north Otago, in the South Island. Marples suggested that it might be an early albatross; subsequent researchers have speculated that it could be a pelagornithid; however, its affinities remain uncertain. The genus name Manu is Māori for "bird"; the specific epithet antiquus is Latin for "old" or "ancient".
