= Pinas (disambiguation) =

Pinas is a commune of the Hautes-Pyrénées département in southwestern France.

Pinas or Piñas may also refer to:

== Places ==
- Pinas (country), a contraction of Pilipinas, the Republic of the Philippines
- Piñas Canton, El Oro Province, Ecuador
- Piñas, Comerío, Puerto Rico, a barrio
- Piñas, Toa Alta, Puerto Rico, a barrio
- Las Piñas, a city in the Philippines

== Other uses ==
- Pinas (Philippine newspaper), a newspaper of Metro Manila
- Pinas (ship), a type of Malaysian sailing vessel
- Pinas FM 95.5, an FM radio station in the Philippines
- Brian Pinas (born 1978), Dutch football player

== See also ==
- Pina (disambiguation)
- Piña (disambiguation)
