= Protopelicanus =

Protopelicanus Temporal range: Late Eocene

Scientific classification
- Kingdom: Animalia
- Phylum: Chordata
- Class: Aves
- Infraclass: Neognathae
- Order: incertae sedis
- Family: incertae sedis
- Genus: †Protopelicanus; Reichenbach, 1852
- Species: †P. cuvierii

Binomial name
- †Protopelicanus cuvierii Reichenbach, 1852

Extinct genus of birds

Protopelicanus cuvierii is a putative fossil waterbird of uncertain affinities. It was briefly described and figured by Georges Cuvier in 1822 from Late Eocene material from Montmartre, France, though not formally described and named until 1852 by German botanist and ornithologist Ludwig Reichenbach as an early pelecanid. The original material comprised the cranial part of a left scapula and a nearly complete left femur. The lectotype femur was thought by Michel Brunet in 1970 to be typical of a pelican. However, Colin Harrison in 1979 considered that it belonged to the Sulidae, and Storrs Olson in 1995 thought it might be a pelagornithid. The femur is held by the Muséum national d'histoire naturelle in Paris (No.7978); the location of the scapular fragment is unknown.
