= Caspiodontornis =

Caspiodontornis Temporal range: Late Oligocene 28–25 Ma

Scientific classification
- Kingdom: Animalia
- Phylum: Chordata
- Class: Aves
- Order: †Odontopterygiformes
- Family: †Pelagornithidae
- Genus: †Caspiodontornis; Aslanova & Burchak-Abramovich, 1982
- Species: †C. kobystanicus

Binomial name
- †Caspiodontornis kobystanicus Aslanova & Burchak-Abramovich, 1982

Synonyms
- See text

Extinct genus of birds

Caspiodontornis is a genus of the prehistoric pseudotooth birds. These were probably rather close relatives of either pelicans and storks, or of waterfowl, and are here placed in the order Odontopterygiformes to account for this uncertainty.

Only a single species, Caspiodontornis kobystanicus, is known to date. Its remains – a fairly complete skull and beak – were found in early Late Oligocene (Chattian, MP25-30) rocks at Pirəkəşkül (Azerbaijan). From the same deposits the supposed giant swan Guguschia nailiae was described earlier; it is only known from wing bones. The affiliation of G. nailiae is not known but it does not seem to be a swan; the size of its remains agrees sufficiently well with those of C. kobystanicus to indicate that they may be from a single species, to which the older name G. nailiae would apply.
