= Piña de Esgueva =

Coordinates: 41°44′N 4°25′W

Piña de Esgueva, Spain
- Flag Coat of arms

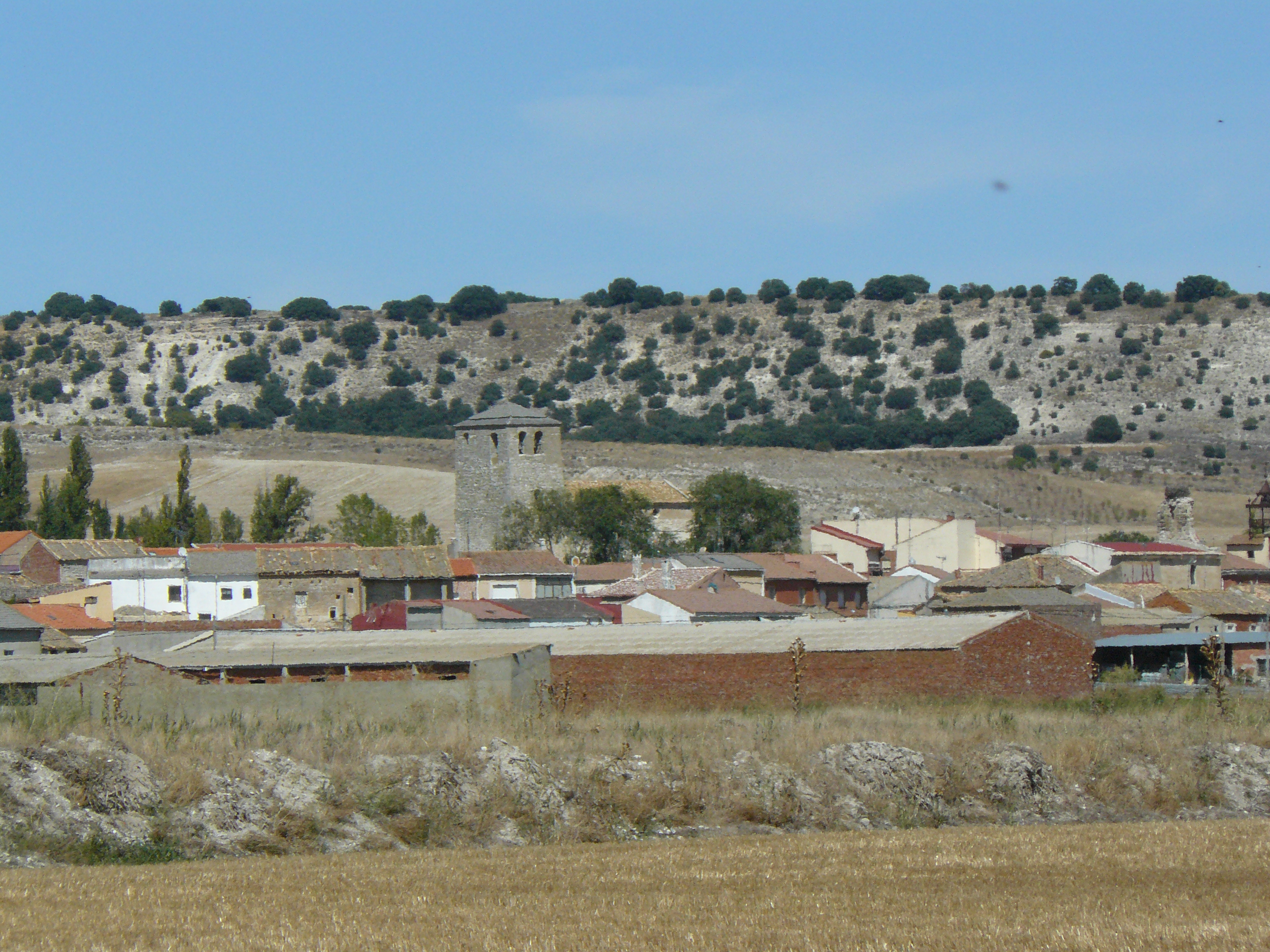
- Panoramic view
- Country: Spain
- Autonomous community: Castile and León
- Province: Valladolid
- Municipality: Piña de Esgueva

Area
  - Total: 29.82 km^{2} (11.51 sq mi)

Population (2025-01-01)
  - Total: 313
  - Density: 10.5/km^{2} (27.2/sq mi)
- Time zone: UTC+1 (CET)
  - Summer (DST): UTC+2 (CEST)

Piña de Esgueva is a municipality located in the province of Valladolid, Castile and León, Spain. According to the 2004 census (INE), the municipality has a population of 359 inhabitants.
