= Famara =

Mountain range on Lanzarote, Canary Islands

Coordinates: 29°07′34″N 13°31′34″W

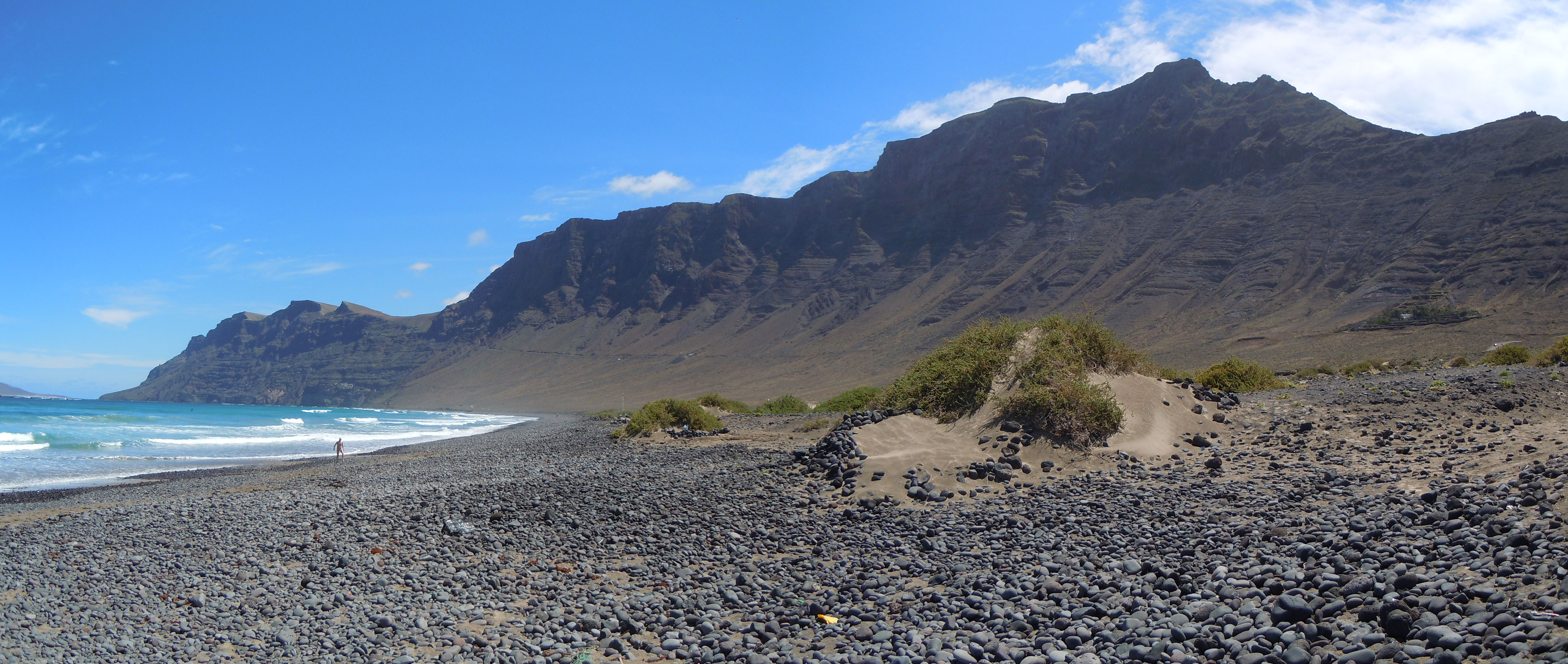
- Famara cliffs

Highest point
- Peak: Peñas del Chache
- Elevation: 671 m (2,201 ft)
- Prominence: 671 m (2,201 ft)

Geography
- Location within Lanzarote
- Country: Spain
- Autonomous community: Canary Islands
- Province: Las Palmas

Geology
- Rock age: Miocene
- Mountain type: Volcanic mountain

Famara is the main mountainous massif in the north of the island of Lanzarote in the Canary Islands. It is the eastern slope of a volcano erupting in the Miocene. The cliffs of Famara (Risco de Famara) are the remains of a caldera of about ten kilometres in diameter centred on the south of La Graciosa.

The cliffs of Famara peak at an altitude of 671 m at the Peñas del Chache. A village at the range's seaside is Caleta de Famara, part of Teguise.

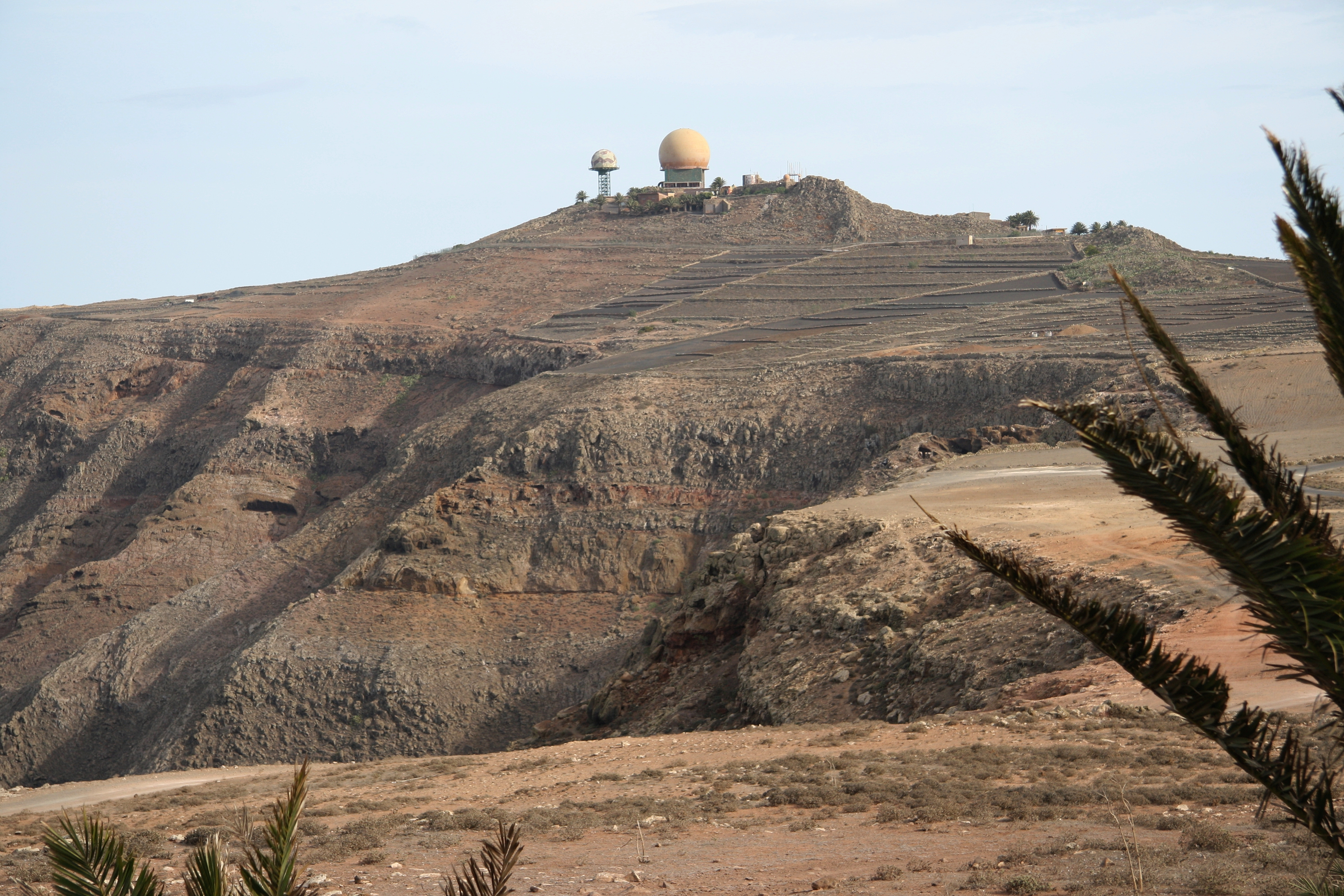
Peñas del Chache, Famara's highest peak.

== Playa de Famara ==
The beach south of the cliffs of Famara, the Playa de Famara, is one of sand and volcanic pebbles. It is two kilometres long. Its orientation towards the Atlantic Ocean makes it suitable for the practice of surfing.

A popular seaside resort, Caleta de Famara, has been built here. It is part of the Teguise municipality.

== Environment ==
The coast north of Famara beach is closed by cliffs and inaccessible to vehicles. It is a remarkable biodiversity site, with about ten species of endemic plants at the site.

All the cliffs of Famara and its coastline are integrated into the natural park of the Chinijo Archipelago.

=== Endemic plants ===
There are about ten species of endemic plants on the coastal plain at the foot of the Famara cliffs. This endemism has been fostered by isolation dating back more than a million years.

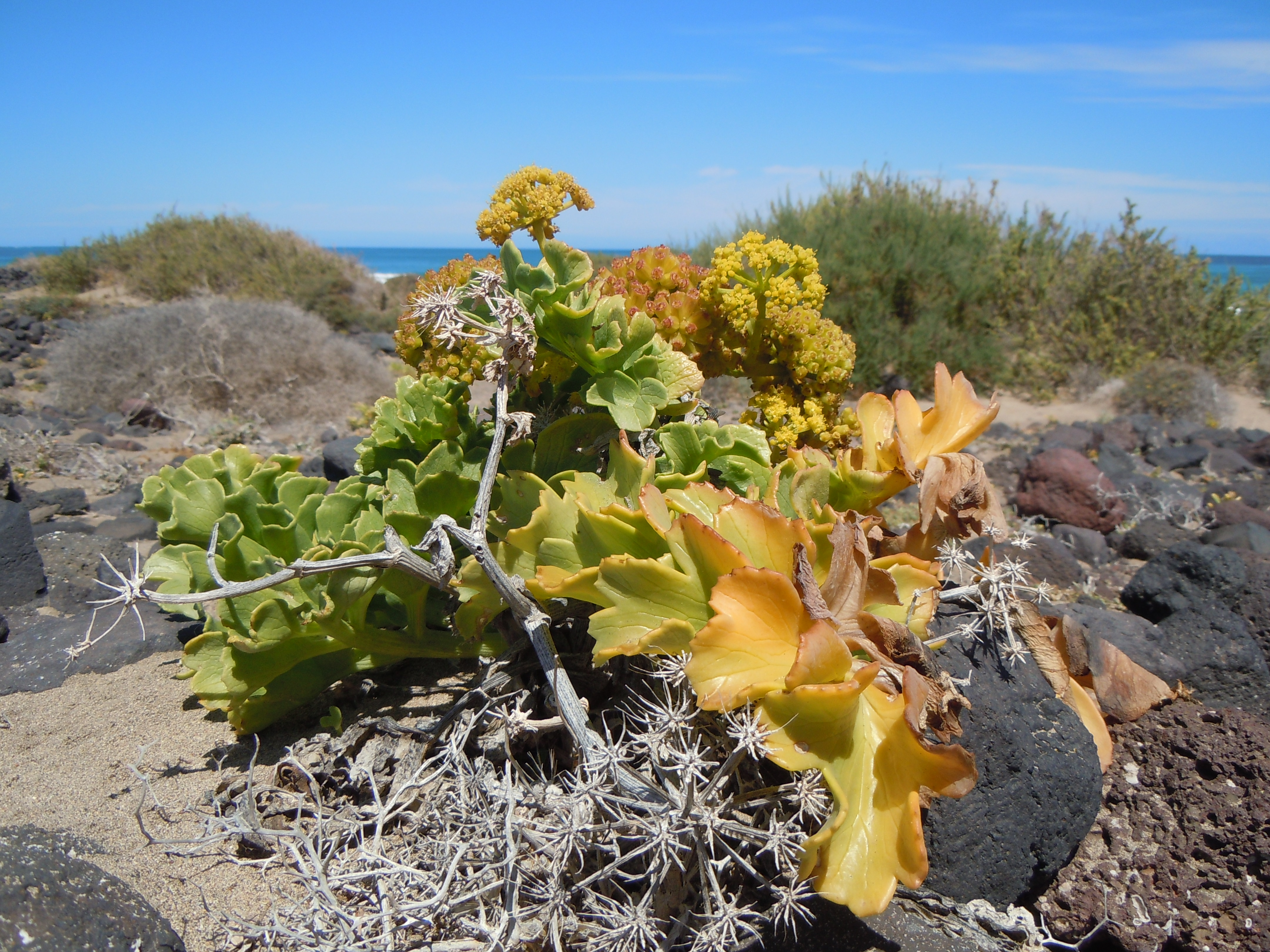
Astydamia latifolia

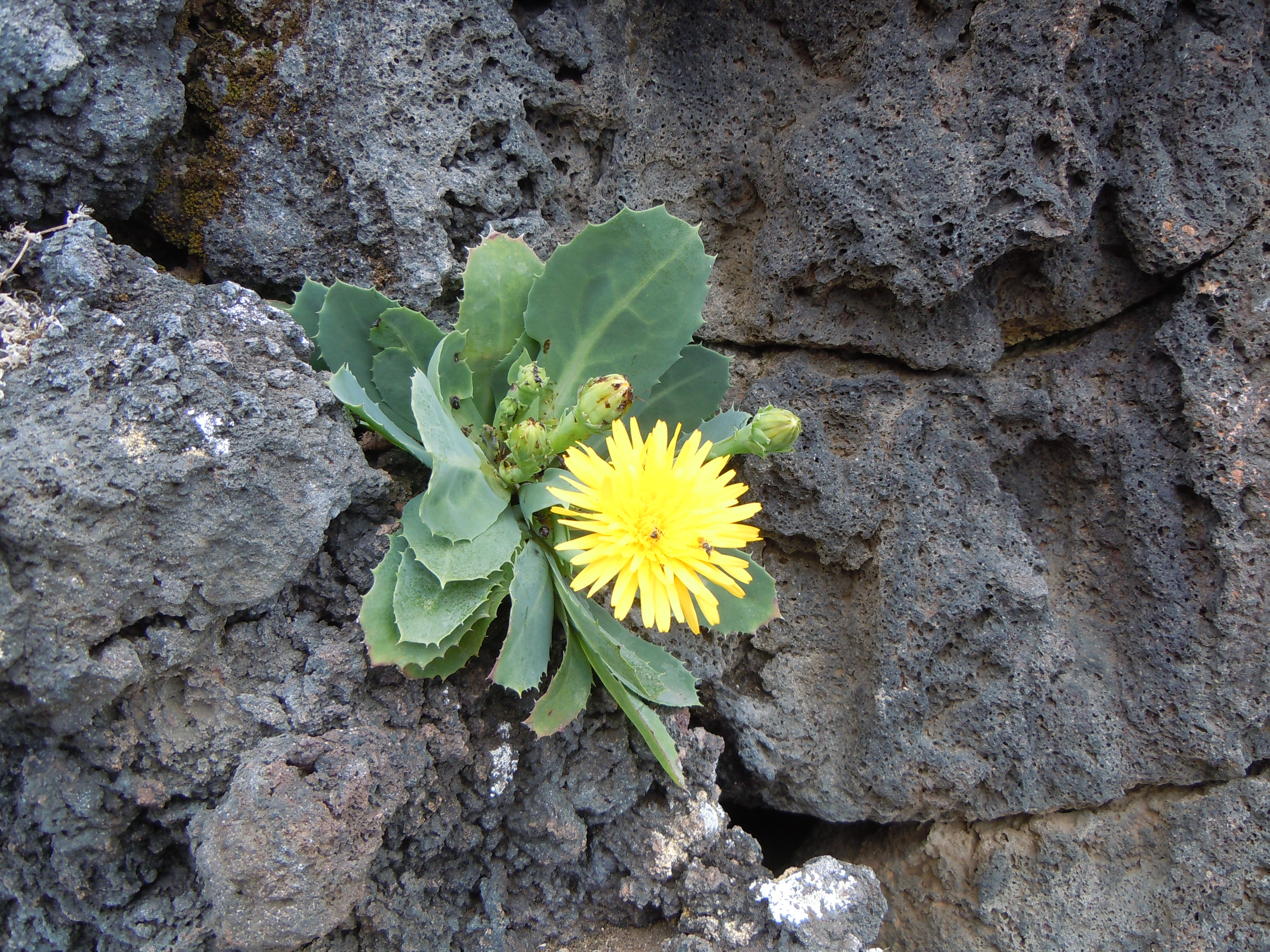
Reichardia famarae

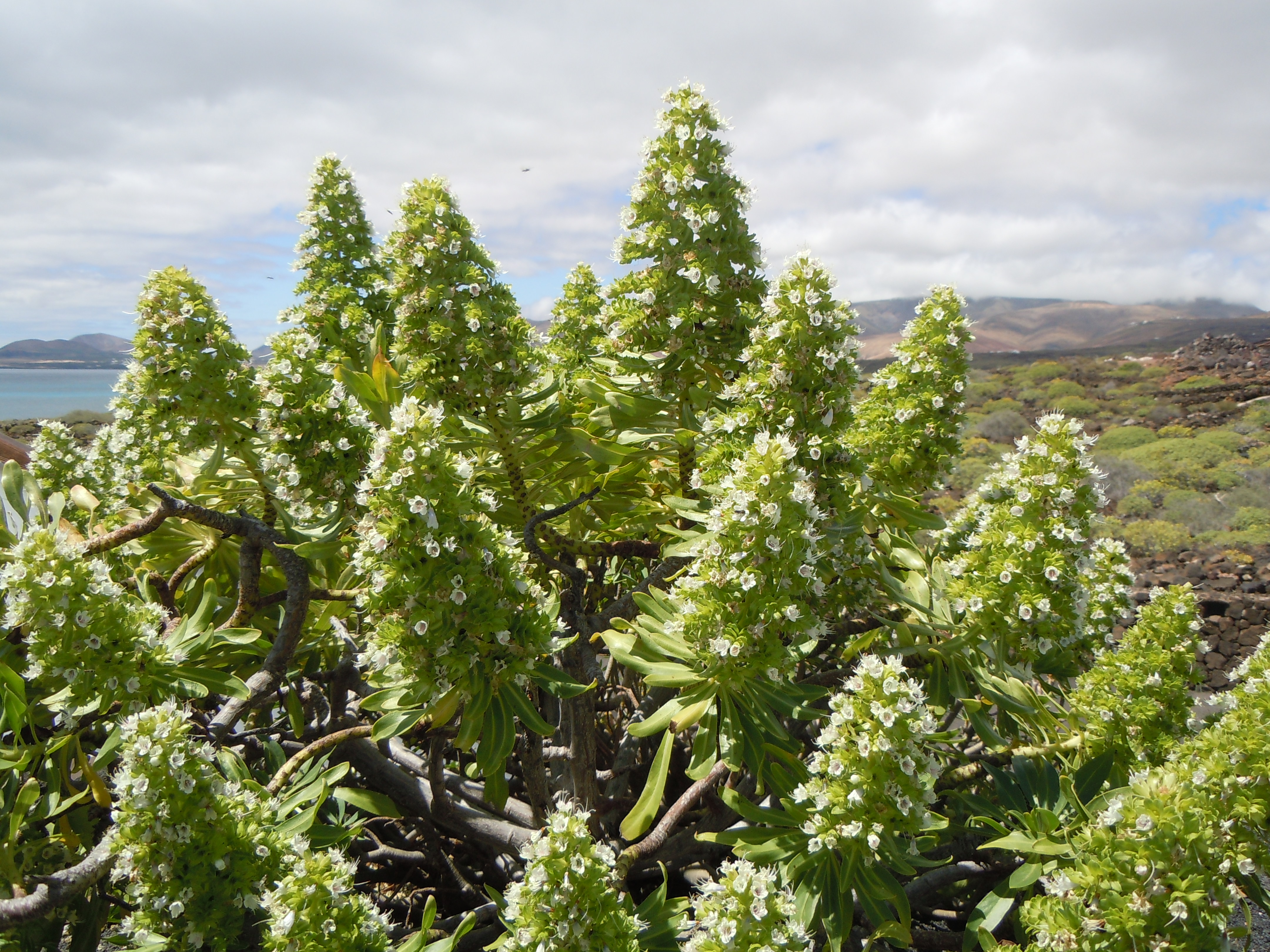
Echium decaisnei

=== Pollution ===
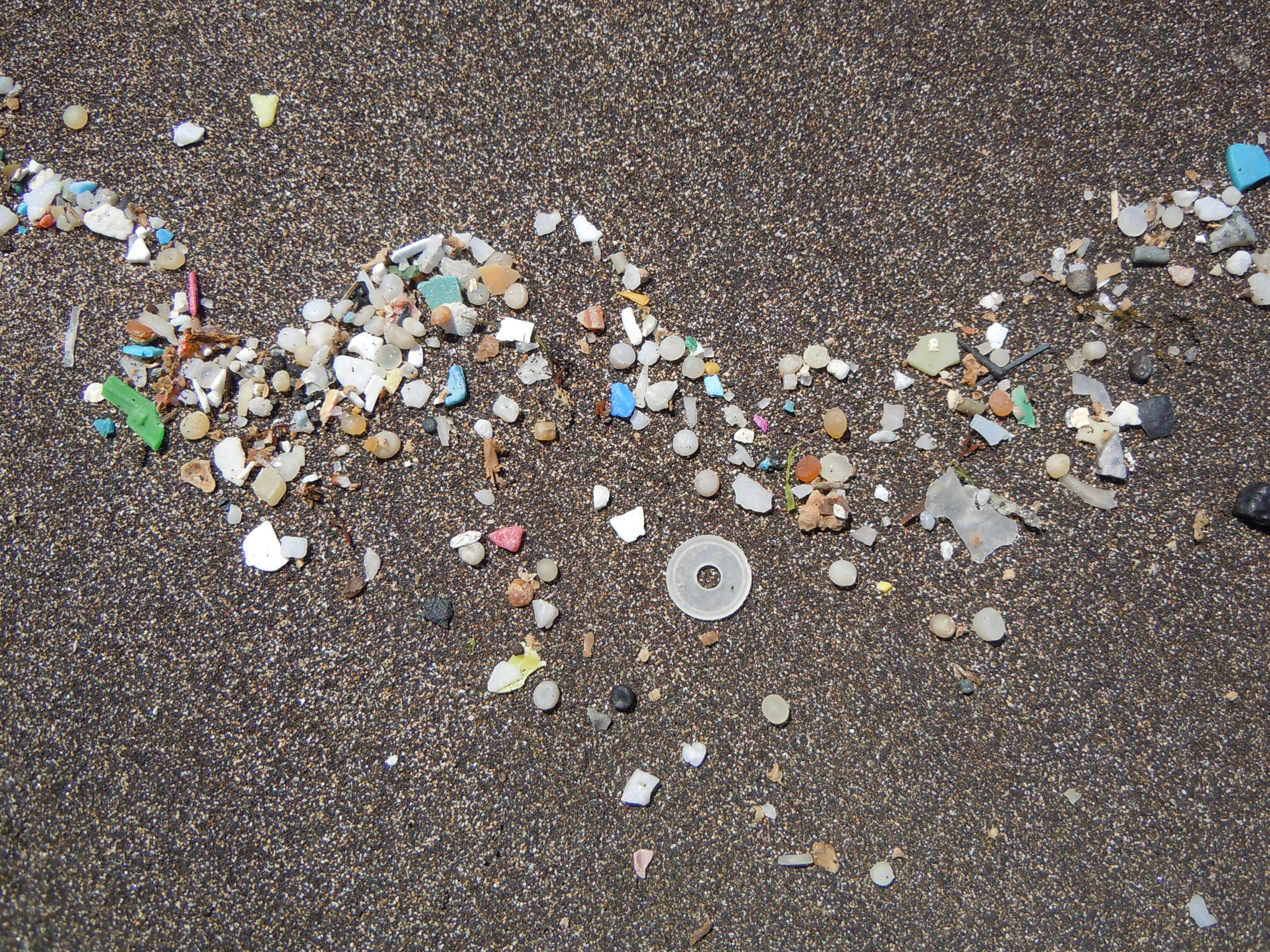
Plastic resin pellet on the beach of Famara

Exposed to currents from the west, Famara Beach is a site of waste accumulation from the North Atlantic garbage patch

== Bibliography ==
- Kunkel, Günther W.H. (1982). Los Riscos de Famara (Lanzarote, Islas Canarias) : Breve descripción y guía florística. Naturalia Hispanica (in Spanish). Madrid: Instituto nacional para la conservacion de la naturaleza. p. 118.
