= Peñas Azules =

- Location within Argentina

Highest point
- Elevation: 5,970 m (19,590 ft)
- Prominence: 783 m (2,569 ft)
- Parent peak: Monte Pissis
- Coordinates: 27°59′28.67″S 068°39′08.64″W

Geography
- Parent range: Argentine Andes, Andes

Climbing
- First ascent: 03/11/1955 - Vicente Cichitti, Jorge Guajardo, Hermann Klark (Argentina)

Cerro Peñas Azules is a peak in Argentina with an elevation of 5,970 metres (19,587 ft) metres. Peñas Azules is within the following mountain ranges: Argentine Andes and Puna de Atacama. It is located within the territory of the Argentinean province of La Rioja. Its slopes are within the administrative boundaries of the Argentinean city of Vinchina.

== First Ascent ==
Peñas Azules was first climbed by Vicente Cichitti, Jorge Guajardo and Hermann Klark (Argentina) March 11th 1955.

== Elevation ==
Data from available digital elevation model ASTER yields 5947 metres. The height of the nearest key col is 5187 meters, leading to a topographic prominence of 783 meters. Peñas Azules is considered a Mountain Subgroup according to the Dominance System and its dominance is 13.12%. Its parent peak is Pissis and the Topographic isolation is 30 kilometers.
