= Pena (surname) =

Pena or Péna is a surname. Notable people with the surname include:

- Afonso Pena (1847–1909), Brazilian politician
- Danny Pena (born 1968), American soccer player
- Marc Péna (born 1960), French academic and politician
- Marius Pena (born 1985), Romanian soccer player
- Paul Pena (1950–2005), American singer
- Trebor Pena (born 2002), American football player

== See also ==
- Peña (surname)
