= Guimarães Cable Car =

Gondola lift linking Guimarães with Monte de Penha in Portugal

- Teleférico de Guimarães
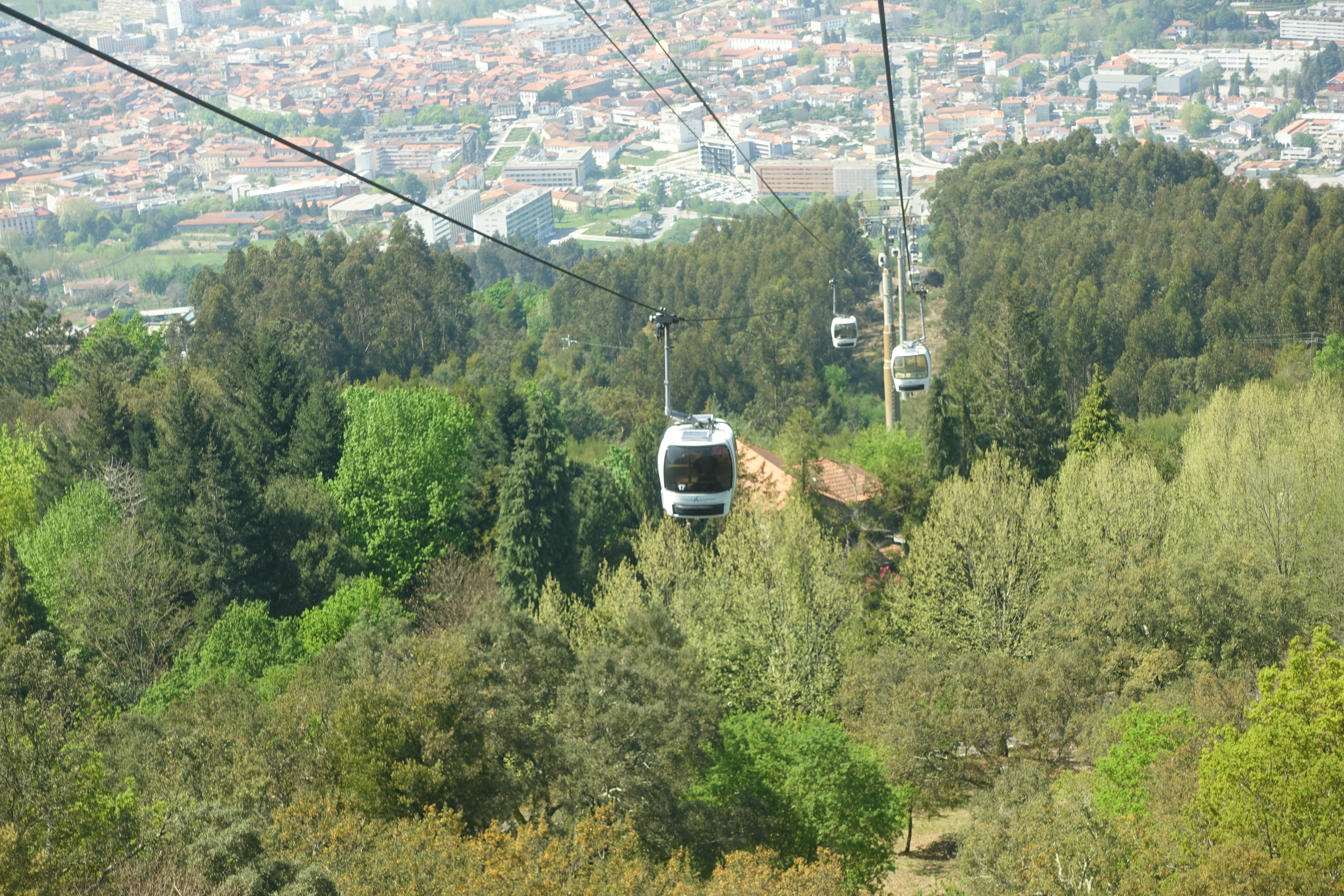
- Looking down the line

Overview
- Status: Operational
- Location: Guimarães; Portugal
- Open: 1995
- Website: https://turipenha.pt/

Operation
- Operator: Turipenha

Technical features
- Aerial lift type: Mono-cable gondola detachable
- Manufactured by: Pomagalski
- Line length: 1,700 metres (5,600 ft)

The Guimarães Cable Car or Teleferico de Guimarães, sometimes also known as the Penha Cable Car or Teleférico da Penha, is a gondola lift that connects the city centre of the Portuguese city of Guimarães to the summit of the nearby Monte da Penha, the location of the Penha Sanctuary. Both the lift and the destination provide a panoramic view of the centre of Guimarães.

The line was built by the French company Pomagalski and is operated by the local company Turipenha. The line opened on 24 June 1995, and was the first cable car to operate in Portugal. It is 1,646 metres (5,400 ft) in length, is supported on 14 pylons, and there is a 366-metre (1,201 ft) height difference between the two stations.

The cable car is equipped with thirty-two passenger cabins, each with a capacity of six passengers, and eight hybrid cabins, with a capacity of three passengers and three bicycles, for use by bikers who use the slopes that descend from the top of the mountain to the city. The line has a maximum speed of 5 metres per second (16 ft/s), but normally operates at 3.6 metres per second (12 ft/s). Travel time is 7 minutes 40 seconds, and the line can carry up to 1,000 passengers per hour.

== See also ==
- List of gondola lifts
