= Peñas del Chache =

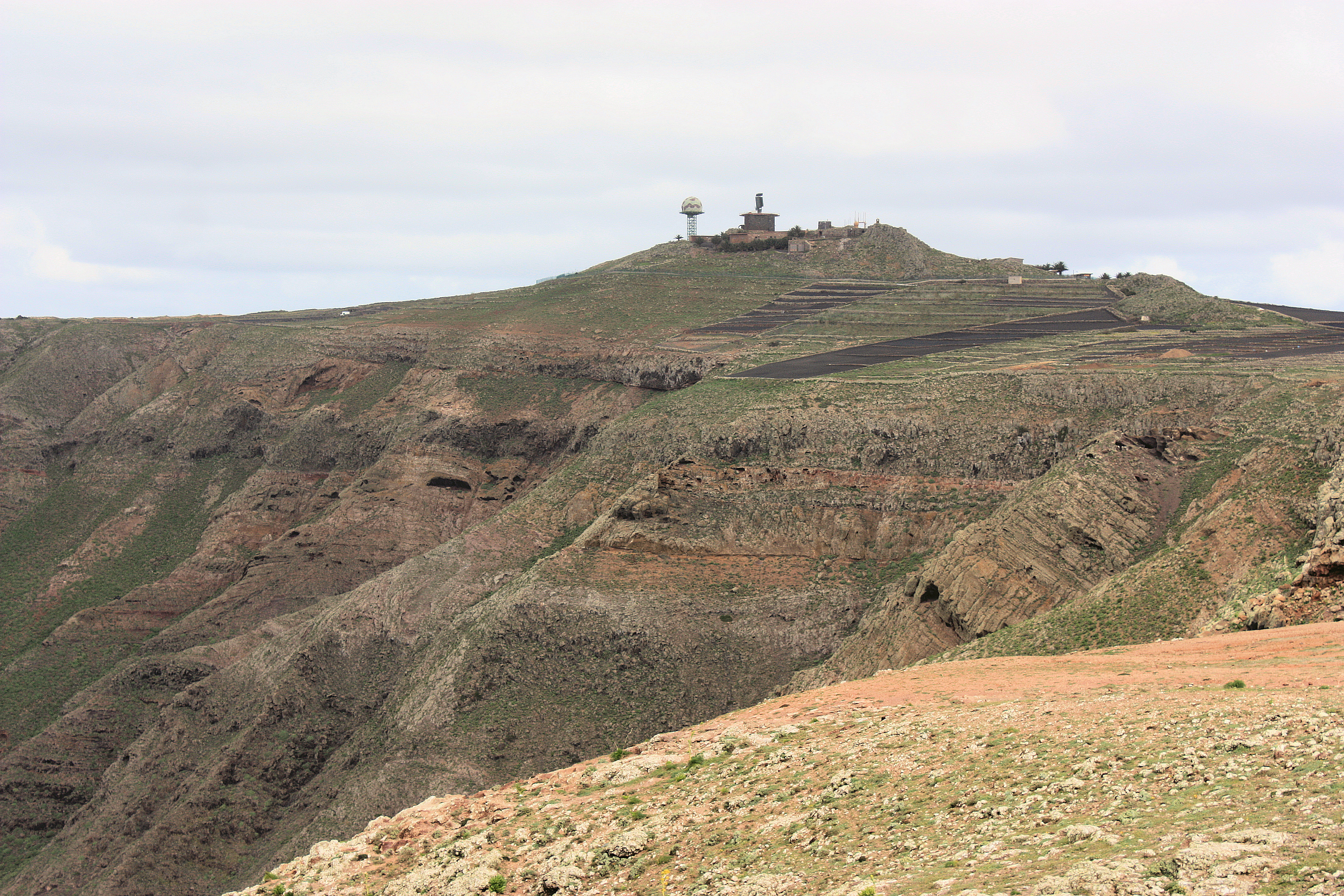
- Las Peñas del Chache, with the facilities of the Air Force Barracks

Highest point
- Elevation: 672 m (2,205 ft)
- Prominence: 672 m (2,205 ft)
- Coordinates: 29°07′10″N 13°31′15″W

Geography
- Location within Canary Islands
- Location: Haría, Lanzarote, Canary Islands, Spain

Geology
- Mountain type: Stratovolcano

Peñas del Chache is the highest altitude of the island of Lanzarote, Canary Islands, Spain, with a height of 672 meters above sea level. It is located in the north of the island, in the municipality of Haría.

== Toponymy ==
The term Chache is of probably of Guanche origin. As for its possible meaning, the philologist Maximiano Trapero has proposed its translation as 'the height'.

== Characteristics ==
Peñas del Chache is a rocky mountain located in the Famara massif. The top is occupied by an installation of the Air Surveillance Squadron.

=== Geology ===
Peñas del Chache is a basaltic intrusive formation dating from the Miocene period, and is part of the Famara volcanic edifice, one of the oldest massifs on the island.

=== Vegetation ===
The surroundings of the Peñas del Chache were characterized by thickets of the Canarian thermophilic forest in the past. However, historical human activity has caused its near disappearance, finding itself dominated by substitution thickets such as bitter tabaibal in modern times, dominated by the wild spurge Euphorbia regis-jubae, and the tojio thickets Asteriscus intermedius and Lavandula dentata.

== Archeological sites ==
Nearby, archaeological remains of the ancient inhabitants of Lanzarote, the majos, have been found.
