= La Peña =

La Peña may refer to:

== Places ==
- La Peña, Bilbao, borough of the city of Bilbao, Spain
- La Peña, Cundinamarca, village in the Cundinamarca department of Colombia
- La Peña, Salamanca, village in the Salamanca province of Spain
- La Peña, Panama

== People with the surname, La Peña, La Pena or LaPena ==
- Alcira de la Peña (1910–1998), Argentine physician and political leader
- Carlota Garrido de la Peña (1870–1958), Argentine journalist, writer and teacher
- Félix de la Peña, governor of Córdoba Province, Argentina
- Frank LaPena (1937–2019), Nomtipom-Wintu American Indian painter, printmaker, ethnographer, professor, ceremonial dancer, poet, and writer.
- Horacio de la Peña (born 1966), Argentine tennis coach and a former tennis player
- Juan Manuel de la Peña Bonifaz (died 1669), Spanish politician, ad interim governor and captain-general of the Philippines in 1668-1669
- Manuel la Peña (fl. 1808–1811), Spanish military officer who served during the Peninsular War
- Manuel de la Peña y Peña (1789–1850), Mexican politician and lawyer, short lived interim president of Mexico in 1847 and president during the course of 1848

== Other ==
- La Peña Cultural Center, Chilean-American culture center in the United States
- La Peña Sporting, Peruvian football club
