= Monte da Penha =

Highest point of Guimarães, Portugal

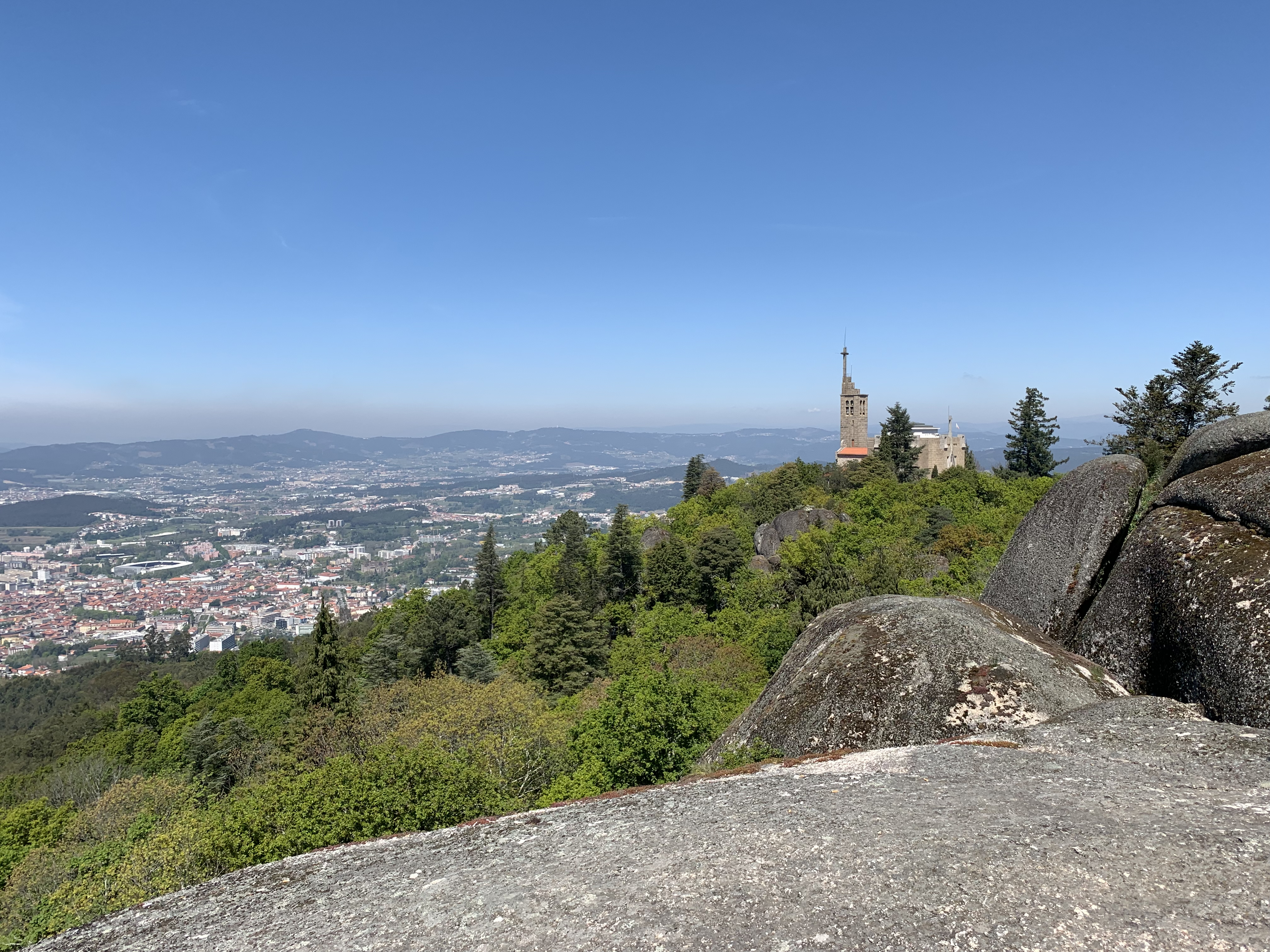
- The summit of Monte da Penha with the city of Guimarães below

Highest point
- Elevation: 613 metres (2,011 ft)
- Coordinates: 41°25′54.534″N 8°16′11.114″W

Geography

Monte da Penha, or Monte de Santa Catarina, is the highest point in the Portuguese city of Guimarães, with a height of 613 metres (2,011 ft) above mean sea level. The hill provides a panoramic view of the centre of Guimarães, and is accessible by road and by the Guimarães Cable Car, a gondola lift from the city centre.

Monte da Penha is the location of the Penha Sanctuary, an art deco style church constructed between 1930 and 1947. There is an annual pilgrimage to the site on the second Sunday in September.

The top of Monte da Penha is dotted with granite outcrops, several of which were used as shelters during the Copper and Bronze Ages. Archaeological remains found in these natural cavities consist of ceramic fragments and various types of stone and metal objects. Some of these can be seen at the museum of the Martins Sarmento Society, in Guimarães, and the Museu Nacional de Arqueologia, in Lisbon.
