= Adductor muscle =

A adductor muscle is any muscle that causes adduction. It may refer to:

== Humans ==
- Adductor muscles of the hip, the most common reference in humans, but may also refer to
  - Adductor brevis muscle, a muscle in the thigh situated immediately behind the pectineus and adductor longus
  - Adductor hallucis muscle, a muscle responsible for adducting the big toe
  - Adductor longus muscle, a skeletal muscle located in the thigh
  - Adductor magnus on the medial side of the thigh
  - Adductor minimus muscle, a small and flat skeletal muscle in the thigh
  - Adductor pollicis muscle, a muscle in the hand that functions to adduct the thumb

== Other animals ==
- Adductor muscles (bivalve), a muscle in the interior of a bivalve mollusk which close the valves
- The large foot-to-shell muscle in gastropods such as the abalone and limpet
