= List of birds of Saint Martin (island) =

This is a list of the bird species recorded in Saint Martin. The island of Saint Martin is split in half, with the northern half, cited here, administered by France, and the southern half administered by the Netherlands. The avifauna of Collectivity of Saint Martin included a total of 175 species, according to Bird Checklists of the World as of July 2022. Of them, 5 have been introduced by humans.

This list is presented in the taxonomic sequence of the Check-list of North and Middle American Birds, 7th edition through the 63rd Supplement, published by the American Ornithological Society (AOS). Common and scientific names are also those of the Check-list, except that the common names of families are from the Clements taxonomy because the AOS list does not include them.

The following tags have been used to highlight several categories of occurrence.

- (A) Accidental - a species that rarely or accidentally occurs in Saint Martin
- (I) Introduced - a species introduced to Saint Martin as a consequence of human actions

== Ducks, geese, and waterfowl ==
Order: Anseriformes Family: Anatidae

Anatidae includes the ducks and most duck-like waterfowl, such as geese and swans. These birds are adapted to an aquatic existence with webbed feet, flattened bills, and feathers that are excellent at shedding water due to an oily coating.

- Wood duck, Aix sponsa (A)
- Blue-winged teal, Spatula discors (A)
- Cinnamon teal, Spatula cyanoptera (A)
- Northern shoveler, Spatula clypeata (A)
- American wigeon, Mareca americana (A)
- White-cheeked pintail, Anas bahamensis (A)
- Northern pintail, Anas acuta (A)
- Green-winged teal, Anas crecca
- Common pochard, Aythya ferina (A)
- Ring-necked duck, Aythya collaris (A)
- Lesser scaup, Aythya affinis (A)
- Bufflehead, Bucephala albeola (A)
- Hooded merganser, Lophodytes cucullatus (A)
- Red-breasted merganser, Mergus serrator (A)
- Ruddy duck, Oxyura jamaicensis (A)

== Guineafowl ==
Order: Galliformes Family: Numididae

Guineafowl are a group of African, seed-eating, ground-nesting birds that resemble partridges, but with featherless heads and spangled grey plumage.

- Helmeted guineafowl, Numida meleagris (I)

== Flamingos ==
Order: Phoenicopteriformes Family: Phoenicopteridae

Flamingos are gregarious wading birds, usually 3 to 5 feet (0.9 to 1.5 m) tall, found in both the Western and Eastern Hemispheres. Flamingos filter-feed on shellfish and algae. Their oddly shaped beaks are specially adapted to separate mud and silt from the food they consume and, uniquely, are used upside-down.

- American flamingo, Phoenicopterus ruber (A)

== Grebes ==
Order: Podicipediformes Family: Podicipedidae

Grebes are small to medium-large freshwater diving birds. They have lobed toes and are excellent swimmers and divers. However, they have their feet placed far back on the body, making them quite ungainly on land.

- Pied-billed grebe, Podilymbus podiceps

== Pigeons and doves ==
Order: Columbiformes Family: Columbidae

Pigeons and doves are stout-bodied birds with short necks and short slender bills with a fleshy cere.

- Rock pigeon, Columba livia (I)
- Scaly-naped pigeon, Patagioenas squamosa
- Bare-eyed pigeon, Patagioenas corensis (I)
- White-crowned pigeon, Patagioenas leucocephala (A)
- Eurasian collared-dove, Streptopelia decaocto (I)
- Common ground dove, Columbina passerina
- Bridled quail-dove, Geotrygon mystacea (A)
- White-winged dove, Zenaida asiatica (A)
- Zenaida dove, Zenaida aurita

== Cuckoos ==
Order: Cuculiformes Family: Cuculidae

The family Cuculidae includes cuckoos, roadrunners, and anis. These birds are of variable size with slender bodies, long tails, and strong legs. The Old World cuckoos are brood parasites.

- Yellow-billed cuckoo, Coccyzus americanus (A)
- Mangrove cuckoo, Coccyzus minor

== Nightjars and allies ==
Order: Caprimulgiformes Family: Caprimulgidae

Nightjars are medium-sized nocturnal birds that usually nest on the ground. They have long wings, short legs and very short bills. Most have small feet, of little use for walking, and long pointed wings. Their soft plumage is camouflaged to resemble bark or leaves.

- Chuck-will's-widow, Antrostomus carolinensis (A)

== Swifts ==
Order: Apodiformes Family: Apodidae

Swifts are small birds which spend the majority of their lives flying. These birds have very short legs and never settle voluntarily on the ground, perching instead only on vertical surfaces. Many swifts have long swept-back wings which resemble a crescent or boomerang.

- Black swift, Cypseloides niger

== Hummingbirds ==
Order: Apodiformes Family: Trochilidae

Hummingbirds are small birds capable of hovering in mid-air due to the rapid flapping of their wings. They are the only birds that can fly backwards.

- Purple-throated carib, Eulampis jugularis (A)
- Green-throated carib, Eulampis holosericeus
- Antillean crested hummingbird, Orthorhyncus cristatus (extirpated)

== Rails, gallinules, and coots ==
Order: Gruiformes Family: Rallidae

Rallidae is a large family of small to medium-sized birds which includes the rails, crakes, coots, and gallinules. Typically they inhabit dense vegetation in damp environments near lakes, swamps, or rivers. In general they are shy and secretive birds, making them difficult to observe. Most species have strong legs and long toes which are well adapted to soft uneven surfaces. They tend to have short, rounded wings and to be weak fliers.

- Clapper rail, Rallus crepitans (A)
- Sora, Porzana carolina
- Spotted crake, Porzana porzana (A)
- Common gallinule, Gallinula galeata
- American coot, Fulica americana
- Purple gallinule, Porphyrio martinica (A)

== Stilts and avocets ==
Order: Charadriiformes Family: Recurvirostridae

Recurvirostridae is a family of large wading birds which includes the avocets and stilts. The avocets have long legs and long up-curved bills. The stilts have extremely long legs and long, thin, straight bills.

- Black-necked stilt, Himantopus mexicanus

== Oystercatchers ==
Order: Charadriiformes Family: Haematopodidae

The oystercatchers are large and noisy plover-like birds, with strong bills used for smashing or prising open molluscs.

- American oystercatcher, Haematopus palliatus (A)

== Plovers and lapwings ==
Order: Charadriiformes Family: Charadriidae

The family Charadriidae includes the plovers, dotterels, and lapwings. They are small to medium-sized birds with compact bodies, short thick necks, and long, usually pointed, wings. They are found in open country worldwide, mostly in habitats near water.

- Black-bellied plover, Pluvialis squatarola
- American golden-plover, Pluvialis dominica (A)
- Killdeer, Charadrius vociferus
- Semipalmated plover, Charadrius semipalmatus
- Piping plover, Charadrius melodus (A)
- Wilson's plover, Charadrius wilsonia
- Collared plover, Charadrius collaris (A)
- Snowy plover, Charadrius nivosus (A)

== Sandpipers and allies ==
Order: Charadriiformes Family: Scolopacidae

Scolopacidae is a large diverse family of small to medium-sized shorebirds including the sandpipers, curlews, godwits, shanks, tattlers, woodcocks, snipes, dowitchers, and phalaropes. The majority of these species eat small invertebrates picked out of the mud or soil. Variation in length of legs and bills enables multiple species to feed in the same habitat, particularly on the coast, without direct competition for food.

- Upland sandpiper, Bartramia longicauda (A)
- Whimbrel, Numenius phaeopus (A)
- Hudsonian godwit, Limosa haemastica (A)
- Marbled godwit, Limosa fedoa (A)
- Ruddy turnstone, Arenaria interpres
- Red knot, Calidris canutus
- Ruff, Calidris pugnax (A)
- Stilt sandpiper, Calidris himantopus (A)
- Sanderling, Calidris alba (A)
- Least sandpiper, Calidris minutilla
- White-rumped sandpiper, Calidris fuscicollis (A)
- Buff-breasted sandpiper, Calidris subruficollis (A)
- Pectoral sandpiper, Calidris melanotos (A)
- Semipalmated sandpiper, Calidris pusilla
- Western sandpiper, Calidris mauri (A)
- Short-billed dowitcher, Limnodromus griseus
- Long-billed dowitcher, Limnodromus scolopaceus (A)
- Wilson's snipe, Gallinago delicata (A)
- Spotted sandpiper, Actitis macularia
- Solitary sandpiper, Tringa solitaria (A)
- Lesser yellowlegs, Tringa flavipes
- Willet, Tringa semipalmata (A)
- Greater yellowlegs, Tringa melanoleuca
- Wilson's phalarope, Phalaropus tricolor (A)

== Skuas and jaegers ==
Order: Charadriiformes Family: Stercorariidae

The family Stercorariidae are, in general, medium to large birds, typically with grey or brown plumage, often with white markings on the wings. They nest on the ground in temperate and arctic regions and are long-distance migrants.

- Pomarine jaeger, Stercorarius pomarinus (A)

== Gulls, terns, and skimmers ==
Order: Charadriiformes Family: Laridae

Laridae is a family of medium to large seabirds and includes gulls, kittiwakes, terns, and skimmers. They are typically grey or white, often with black markings on the head or wings. They have longish bills and webbed feet. Terns are a group of generally medium to large seabirds typically with grey or white plumage, often with black markings on the head. Most terns hunt fish by diving but some pick insects off the surface of fresh water. Terns are generally long-lived birds, with several species known to live in excess of 30 years.

- Black-headed gull, Chroicocephalus ridibundus (A)
- Laughing gull, Leucophaeus atricilla
- Ring-billed gull, Larus delawarensis (A)
- Herring gull, Larus argentatus (A)
- Lesser black-backed gull, Larus fuscus (A)
- Brown noddy, Anous stolidus
- Sooty tern, Onychoprion fuscatus (A)
- Bridled tern, Onychoprion anaethetus (A)
- Least tern, Sternula antillarum
- Gull-billed tern, Gelochelidon nilotica (A)
- Roseate tern, Sterna dougallii (A)
- Common tern, Sterna hirundo (A)
- Forster's tern, Sterna forsteri
- Royal tern, Chlidonias maxima
- Sandwich tern, Chlidonias sandvicensis (A)
- Black skimmer, Rynchops niger (A)

== Tropicbirds ==
Order: Phaethontiformes Family: Phaethontidae

Tropicbirds are slender white birds of tropical oceans, with exceptionally long central tail feathers. Their heads and long wings have black markings.

- White-tailed tropicbird, Phaethon lepturus (A)
- Red-billed tropicbird, Phaethon aethereus (A)

== Southern storm-petrels ==
Order: Procellariiformes Family: Oceanitidae

The storm-petrels are the smallest seabirds, relatives of the petrels, feeding on planktonic crustaceans and small fish picked from the surface, typically while hovering. The flight is fluttering and sometimes bat-like. Until 2018, this family's species were included with the other storm-petrels in family Hydrobatidae.

- Wilson's storm-petrel, Oceanites oceanicus (A)

== Shearwaters and petrels ==
Order: Procellariiformes Family: Procellariidae

The procellariids are the main group of medium-sized "true petrels", characterised by united nostrils with medium septum and a long outer functional primary.

- Sargasso shearwater, Puffinus lherminieri
- Barolo shearwater, Puffinus baroli

== Frigatebirds ==
Order: Suliformes Family: Fregatidae

Frigatebirds are large seabirds usually found over tropical oceans. They are large, black-and-white, or completely black, with long wings and deeply forked tails. The males have coloured inflatable throat pouches. They do not swim or walk and cannot take off from a flat surface. Having the largest wingspan-to-body-weight ratio of any bird, they are essentially aerial, able to stay aloft for more than a week.

- Magnificent frigatebird, Fregata magnificens

== Boobies and gannets ==
Order: Suliformes Family: Sulidae

The sulids comprise the gannets and boobies. Both groups are medium to large coastal seabirds that plunge-dive for fish.

- Masked booby, Sula dactylatra (A)
- Brown booby, Sula leucogaster
- Red-footed booby, Sula sula (A)

== Cormorants and shags ==
Order: Suliformes Family: Phalacrocoracidae

Phalacrocoracidae is a family of medium to large coastal, fish-eating seabirds that includes cormorants and shags. Plumage colouration varies, with the majority having mainly dark plumage, some species being black-and-white and a few being colourful.

- Double-crested cormorant, Nannopterum auritum (A)
- Neotropic cormorant, Nannopterum brasilianum (A)

== Pelicans ==
Order: Pelecaniformes Family: Pelecanidae

Pelicans are large water birds with a distinctive pouch under their beak. As with other members of the order Pelecaniformes, they have webbed feet with four toes.

- American white pelican, Pelecanus erythrorhynchos (A)
- Brown pelican, Pelecanus occidentalis

== Herons, egrets, and bitterns ==
Order: Pelecaniformes Family: Ardeidae

The family Ardeidae contains the bitterns, herons, and egrets. Herons and egrets are medium to large wading birds with long necks and legs. Bitterns tend to be shorter necked and more wary. Members of Ardeidae fly with their necks retracted, unlike other long-necked birds such as storks, ibises, and spoonbills.

- American bittern, Botaurus lentiginosus (A)
- Least bittern, Ixobrychus exilis
- Great blue heron, Ardea herodias
- Great egret, Ardea alba
- Snowy egret, Egretta thula
- Little blue heron, Egretta caerulea
- Tricolored heron, Egretta tricolor (A)
- Reddish egret, Egretta rufescens (A)
- Cattle egret, Bubulcus ibis
- Green heron, Butorides virescens
- Black-crowned night-heron, Nycticorax nycticorax (A)
- Yellow-crowned night-heron, Nyctanassa violacea (A)

== Ibises and spoonbills ==
Order: Pelecaniformes Family: Threskiornithidae

Threskiornithidae is a family of large terrestrial and wading birds which includes the ibises and spoonbills. They have long, broad wings with 11 primary and about 20 secondary feathers. They are strong fliers and despite their size and weight, very capable soarers.

- Scarlet ibis, Eudocimus ruber (A)
- Glossy ibis, Plegadis falcinellus (A)
- Roseate spoonbill, Platalea ajaja (A)

== Osprey ==
Order: Accipitriformes Family: Pandionidae

The family Pandionidae contains only one species, the osprey. The osprey is a medium-large raptor which is a specialist fish-eater with a worldwide distribution.

- Osprey, Pandion haliaetus (A)

== Hawks, eagles, and kites ==
Order: Accipitriformes Family: Accipitridae

Accipitridae is a family of birds of prey, which includes hawks, eagles, kites, harriers, and Old World vultures. These birds have powerful hooked beaks for tearing flesh from their prey, strong legs, powerful talons, and keen eyesight.

- Northern harrier, Circus hudsonius (A)
- Broad-winged hawk, Buteo platypterus (A)
- Red-tailed hawk, Buteo jamaicensis (Ex)

== Kingfishers ==
Order: Coraciiformes Family: Alcedinidae

Kingfishers are medium-sized birds with large heads, long, pointed bills, short legs, and stubby tails.

- Belted kingfisher, Megaceryle alcyon

== Woodpeckers ==
Order: Piciformes Family: Picidae

Woodpeckers are small to medium-sized birds with chisel-like beaks, short legs, stiff tails, and long tongues used for capturing insects. Some species have feet with two toes pointing forward and two backward, while several species have only three toes. Many woodpeckers have the habit of tapping noisily on tree trunks with their beaks.

- Yellow-bellied sapsucker, Sphyrapicus varius (A)

== Falcons and caracaras ==
Order: Falconiformes Family: Falconidae

Falconidae is a family of diurnal birds of prey. They differ from hawks, eagles, and kites in that they kill with their beaks instead of their talons.

- American kestrel, Falco sparverius
- Merlin, Falco columbarius (A)
- Peregrine falcon, Falco peregrinus

== Tyrant flycatchers ==
Order: Passeriformes Family: Tyrannidae

Tyrant flycatchers are passerine birds which occur throughout North and South America. They superficially resemble the Old World flycatchers, but are more robust and have stronger bills. They do not have the sophisticated vocal capabilities of the songbirds. Most, but not all, have plain colouring. As the name implies, most are insectivorous.

- Caribbean elaenia, Elaenia martinica
- Gray kingbird, Tyrannus dominicensis
- Fork-tailed flycatcher, Tyrannus savana (A)

== Vireos, shrike-babblers, and erpornis ==
Order: Passeriformes Family: Vireonidae

The vireos are a group of small to medium-sized passerine birds. They are typically greenish in colour and resemble wood warblers apart from their heavier bills.

- White-eyed vireo, Vireo griseus
- Yellow-throated vireo, Vireo flavifrons (A)
- Red-eyed vireo, Vireo olivaceus (A)
- Black-whiskered vireo, Vireo altiloquus (A)

== Swallows ==
Order: Passeriformes Family: Hirundinidae

The family Hirundinidae is adapted to aerial feeding. They have a slender streamlined body, long pointed wings, and a short bill with a wide gape. The feet are adapted to perching rather than walking, and the front toes are partially joined at the base.

- Caribbean martin, Progne dominicensis
- Barn swallow, Hirundo rustica
- Cliff swallow, Petrochelidon pyrrhonota (A)

== Mockingbirds and thrashers ==
Order: Passeriformes Family: Mimidae

The mimids are a family of passerine birds that includes thrashers, mockingbirds, tremblers, and the New World catbirds. These birds are notable for their vocalizations, especially their ability to mimic a wide variety of birds and other sounds heard outdoors. Their colouring tends towards dull-greys and browns.

- Scaly-breasted thrasher, Allenia fusca
- Pearly-eyed thrasher, Margarops fuscatus

== Thrushes and allies ==
Order: Passeriformes Family: Turdidae

The thrushes are a group of passerine birds that occur mainly in the Old World. They are plump, soft plumaged, small to medium-sized insectivores or sometimes omnivores, often feeding on the ground. Many have attractive songs.

- Spectacled thrush, Turdus nudigenis (A)

== Old World sparrows ==
Order: Passeriformes Family: Passeridae

Old World sparrows are small passerine birds. In general, sparrows tend to be small plump brownish or grayish birds with short tails and short powerful beaks. Sparrows are seed eaters, but they also consume small insects.

- House sparrow, Passer domesticus (I)

== Finches, euphonias, and allies ==
Order: Passeriformes Family: Fringillidae

Finches are seed-eating passerine birds that are small to moderately large and have a strong beak, usually conical and in some species very large. All have twelve tail feathers and nine primaries. These birds have a bouncing flight with alternating bouts of flapping and gliding on closed wings, and most sing well.

- Lesser Antillean euphonia, Chlorophonia flavifrons (A)

== Troupials and allies ==
Order: Passeriformes Family: Icteridae

The icterids are a group of small to medium-sized, often colourful, passerine birds restricted to the New World and include the grackles, New World blackbirds, and New World orioles. Most species have black as the predominant plumage colour, often enlivened by yellow, orange, or red.

- Bobolink, Dolichonyx oryzivorus (A)
- Carib grackle, Quiscalus lugubris

== New World warblers ==
Order: Passeriformes Family: Parulidae

The New World warblers are a group of small, often colourful, passerine birds restricted to the New World. Most are arboreal, but some are terrestrial. Most members of this family are insectivores.

- Ovenbird, Seiurus aurocapilla (A)
- Worm-eating warbler, Helmitheros vermivorum (A)
- Louisiana waterthrush, Parkesia motacilla (A)
- Northern waterthrush, Parkesia noveboracensis (A)
- Blue-winged warbler, Vermivora cyanoptera
- Black-and-white warbler, Mniotilta varia (A)
- Prothonotary warbler, Protonotaria citrea (A)
- Tennessee warbler, Leiothlypis peregrina
- Connecticut warbler, Oporornis agilis (A)
- Kentucky warbler, Geothlypis formosa (A)
- Common yellowthroat, Geothlypis trichas (A)
- Hooded warbler, Setophaga citrina (A)
- American redstart, Setophaga ruticilla (A)
- Cape May warbler, Setophaga tigrina (A)
- Northern parula, Setophaga americana (A)
- Magnolia warbler, Setophaga magnolia (A)
- Yellow warbler, Setophaga petechia
- Chestnut-sided warbler, Setophaga pensylvanica (A)
- Blackpoll warbler, Setophaga striata (A)
- Black-throated blue warbler, Setophaga caerulescens (A)
- Yellow-rumped warbler, Setophaga coronata (A)
- Prairie warbler, Setophaga discolor (A)
- Black-throated green warbler, Setophaga virens (A)

== Cardinals and allies ==
Order: Passeriformes Family: Cardinalidae

The cardinals are a family of robust, seed-eating birds with strong bills. They are typically associated with open woodland. The sexes usually have distinct plumages.

- Scarlet tanager, Piranga olivacea (A)
- Rose-breasted grosbeak, Pheucticus ludovicianus (A)
- Indigo bunting, Passerina cyanea (A)

== Tanagers and allies ==
Order: Passeriformes Family: Thraupidae

The tanagers are a large group of small to medium-sized passerine birds restricted to the New World, mainly in the tropics. Many species are brightly coloured. As a family they are omnivorous, but individual species specialize in eating fruits, seeds, insects, or other types of food.

- Bananaquit, Coereba flaveola
- Lesser Antillean bullfinch, Loxigilla noctis
- Black-faced grassquit, Melanospiza bicolor

== See also ==
- List of birds of Sint Maarten
- List of birds
- Lists of birds by region
