= Prophaethon =

Prophaethon Temporal range: Early Eocene, 56–49 Ma

Scientific classification
- Kingdom: Animalia
- Phylum: Chordata
- Class: Aves
- Order: Phaethontiformes
- Family: †Prophaethontidae
- Genus: †Prophaethon
- Species: †P. shrubsolei

Binomial name
- †Prophaethon shrubsolei Andrews, 1899

Extinct genus of birds

Prophaethon is an extinct genus of seabird that lived during the Early Eocene (Ypresian, c.56-49 mya). As indicated by its generic name, it is a distant relative of the tropicbirds.

== Distribution ==
The type species, P. shrubsolei, is essentially known from a holotype specimen consisting of fairly comprehensive fossil remains of a single individual, namely a skull and some limb bones, which were recovered from the London Clay on the Isle of Sheppey, England. Since its initial description, more remains of P. shrubsolei were described by Gerald Mayr, having been found at Walton-on-the-Naze, also in the London Clay. A second species, P. waltonensis, has also been described from fossil remains hailing from Walton-on-the-Naze.
