= Prophaethontidae =

Prophaethontidae Temporal range: Thanetian–Ypresian

Scientific classification
- Kingdom: Animalia
- Phylum: Chordata
- Class: Aves
- Order: Phaethontiformes
- Family: †Prophaethontidae; Harrison & Walker, 1976

Genera
- †Lithoptila; †Phaethusavis?; †Prophaethon; †Zhylgaia?

Extinct family of water birds

Prophaethontidae is an extinct family of Early Paleogene phaethontiforms that include the genera Lithoptila and Prophaethon, as well as possibly Phaethusavis and Zhylgaia. The anatomy of the prophaethontids were more similar to those of members of the order Procellariiformes than to Phaethontidae, features including nostrils that are long and slit-like, with longer wings and legs. This suggests that prophaethontids were better at swimming and being more pelagic and surface-feeding than tropicbirds are today. Such features were suggested to link the phaethontiforms with the procellariiforms, but molecular studies do not support this and instead support a relationship between phaethontiforms and the order Eurypygiformes.
