= Novacaesareala =

Novacaesareala Temporal range: Latest Cretaceous or earliest Paleocene, 66–65 Ma

Scientific classification
- Kingdom: Animalia
- Phylum: Chordata
- Class: Aves
- Clade: Neoaves
- Genus: †Novacaesareala; Parris & Hope, 2002
- Species: †N. hungerfordi

Binomial name
- †Novacaesareala hungerfordi Parris & Hope, 2002

Extinct genus of birds

Novacaesareala is a genus of prehistoric bird. It is known only from the fossil remains of a single partial wing of the species Novacaesareala hungerfordi. This was found in Hornerstown Formation deposits, probably from the latest Cretaceous (Maastrichtian) or Early Paleocene (Danian); it lived around 66-65 million years ago on the western shores of the Atlantic, where now is New Jersey.

It appears to have been most similar to Torotix clemensi, an even more enigmatic bird from around the same time. Consequently, it might be placed in the Torotigidae. In any case, this species (as well as Torotix) seem to have been seabirds, most probably relatives of the Procellariiformes and/or some lineage of the paraphyletic "Pelecaniformes". Mayr and Scofield (2016) considered potential phaethontiform affinities for Novacaesareala, which would make it most closely related to living tropicbirds and the oldest representative of the group. Its wing structure closely resembles that of the fossil tropicbird Zhylgaia; however, Novacaesareala is estimated to have been larger than any other tropicbird, extinct or extant.
