= Heliadornis =

Scientific classification
- Kingdom: Animalia
- Phylum: Chordata
- Class: Aves
- Order: Phaethontiformes
- Family: Phaethontidae
- Genus: †Heliadornis; Olson, 1985

Species
- 2, see text

Extinct genus of birds

Heliadornis is a genus of prehistoric seabirds related to modern tropicbirds, but native to temperate climates. They lived in the Miocene. Two species have been recognized. Heliadornis ashbyi is known from remains in Maryland in the United States and Antwerp province in Belgium. The latter were from the Brussels–Antwerp motorway between Berchem and Wilrijk. A second species, Heliadornis paratethydicus has been described from Upper Miocene strata in Vösendorf, Austria.
