= Lithoptila =

Lithoptila Temporal range: Paleocene (Thanetian), 59.2–56 Ma

Scientific classification
- Kingdom: Animalia
- Phylum: Chordata
- Class: Aves
- Order: Phaethontiformes
- Family: †Prophaethontidae
- Genus: †Lithoptila; Bourdon, 2005
- Species: †L. abdounensis

Binomial name
- †Lithoptila abdounensis Bourdon, E. et al. 2005

Extinct genus of birds

Lithoptila abdounensis is an extinct species of prophaethontid seabird that lived during the Palaeogene period. It is a distant relative of the tropicbirds.

== Distribution ==
L. abdounensis lived in Morocco, its fossils having been found in strata dating to both the Late Palaeocene and Early Eocene.
