= Zhylgaia =

Zhylgaia Temporal range: Paleocene

Scientific classification
- Domain: Eukaryota
- Kingdom: Animalia
- Phylum: Chordata
- Class: Aves
- Order: Phaethontiformes
- Genus: †Zhylgaia; Nessov, 1988
- Species: †Z. aestiflua

Binomial name
- †Zhylgaia aestiflua Nessov, 1988

Extinct bird

Zhylgaia is a genus of fossil bird. Its remains, consisting of two partial humeri, were recovered from an upper Paleocene deposit in Kazakhstan.

The relationships of this genus are unknown; it was initially placed in the Presbyornithidae, which at that time were believed to be some sort of "transitional shorebird". Upon recognition that the presbyornithids were more likely a prehistoric lineage of fairly advanced waterfowl, Zhylgaia was assigned to the form taxon "Graculavidae", an assemblage of Late Cretaceous and Paleocene shorebirds which are not a natural clade but merely an assemblage of superficially similar birds. All that can be said about this taxon is that it was a modern bird, most likely a neognath.

In 2008, Zhylgaia was assigned to Prophaethontidae—an extinct family related to modern tropicbirds—on the basis of its anatomy and size closely matching the prophaethontid Lithoptila.
