= Phaethusavis =

Phaethusavis Temporal range: Ypresian

Scientific classification
- Kingdom: Animalia
- Phylum: Chordata
- Class: Aves
- Order: Phaethontiformes
- Family: Phaethontidae
- Genus: †Phaethusavis
- Species: †P. pelagicus

Binomial name
- †Phaethusavis pelagicus Bourdon et al., 2008

Extinct genus of birds

Phaethusavis is an extinct genus of phaethontid that lived during the Ypresian stage of the Eocene epoch.

== Distribution ==
Phaethusavis pelagicus is known from the Ouled Abdoun Basin of Morocco.
