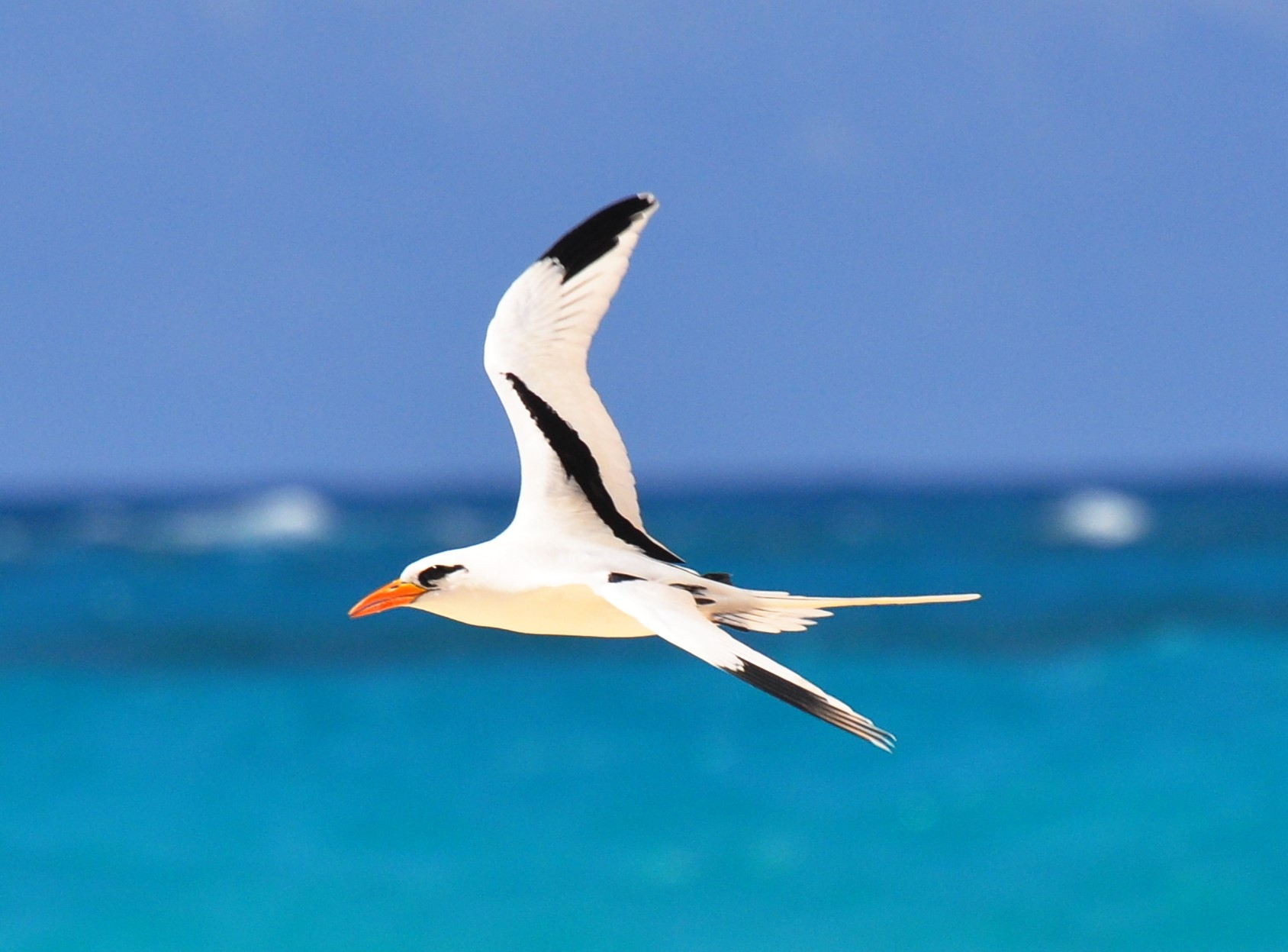
- Warwick Parish, Bermuda

Conservation status
- Least Concern (IUCN 3.1)

Scientific classification
- Kingdom: Animalia
- Phylum: Chordata
- Class: Aves
- Order: Phaethontiformes
- Family: Phaethontidae
- Genus: Phaethon
- Species: P. lepturus

Binomial name
- Phaethon lepturus Daudin, 1802
- White-tailed tropicbird’s range Nonbreeding Breeding

= White-tailed tropicbird =

Species of bird

The white-tailed tropicbird (Phaethon lepturus) or yellow-billed tropicbird is a tropicbird. It is the smallest of three closely related seabirds of the tropical oceans and smallest member of the order Phaethontiformes. It is found in the tropical Atlantic, western Pacific and Indian Oceans. It also breeds on some Caribbean islands, and a few pairs have started nesting recently on Little Tobago, joining the red-billed tropicbird colony. In addition to the tropical Atlantic, it nests as far north as Bermuda, where it is locally called a "longtail".

== Taxonomy ==
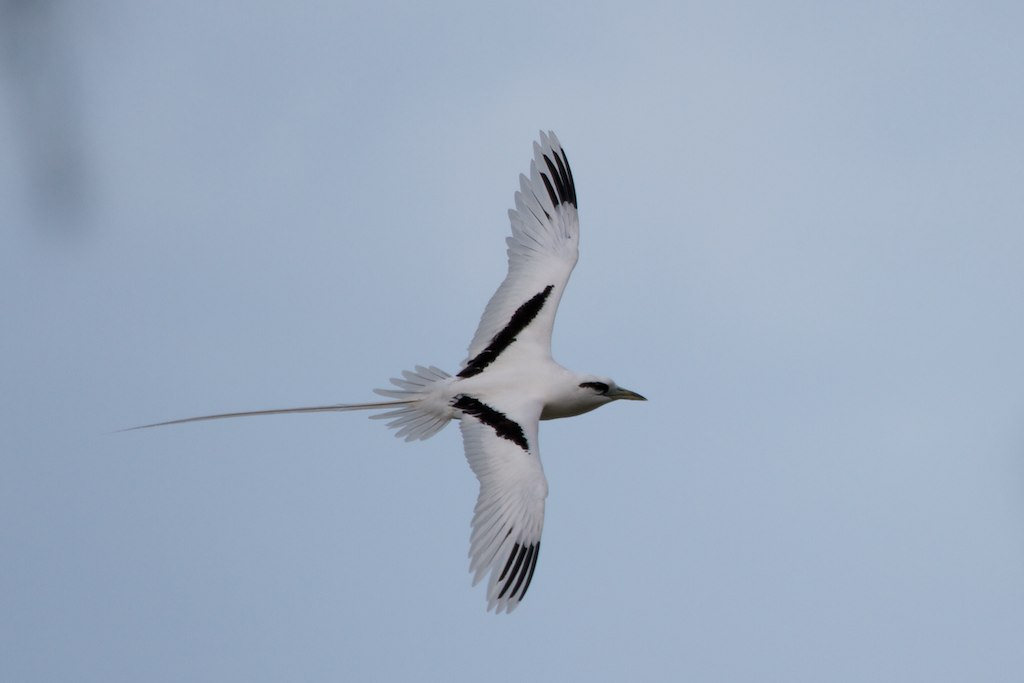
Flying at Midway Atoll

French zoologist François Marie Daudin described the white-tailed tropicbird in 1802.

"White-tailed tropicbird" has been designated the official name by the International Ornithologists' Union (IOC).

Its closest relative is the red-tailed tropicbird (P. rubricauda), the split between their ancestors taking place about four million years ago.

Six subspecies are recognised by the IOC:

- P. l. lepturus: Found across the topical Indian Ocean.
- P. l. fulvus (golden bosun): Native to Christmas Island. This form has a golden wash to the white plumage.
- P. l. dorotheae: tropical western Pacific
- P. l. catesbyi: Bermuda and Caribbean
- P. l. ascensionis: Ascension Island and Fernando de Noronha
- P. l. europae: Europa Island, s. Mozambique Channel

== Description ==
The adult white-tailed tropicbird is a slender, mainly white bird, 71–80 cm (28–31 in) long including the very long central tail feathers, which double its total length. The wingspan is 89–96 cm (35–38 in). The bird has a black band on the inner wing, a black eye-mask, and an orange-yellow to orange-red bill. The bill colour, pure white back and black wing bar distinguish this species from the red-billed tropicbird.

The white-tailed tropicbird breeds on tropical islands, laying a single egg directly onto the ground or a cliff ledge. It disperses widely across the oceans when not breeding, and sometimes wanders far. It feeds on fish and squid, caught by surface plunging, but this species is a poor swimmer. The call is a high screamed keee-keee-krrrt-krrt-krrt. Sexes are similar, although males on average are longer tailed, but juveniles lack the tail streamers, have a green-yellow bill, and a finely barred back. The white-tailed tropicbird does not have a yearly breeding cycle; instead, breeding frequency depends on the climate and availability of suitable breeding sites. The bird can reproduce 10 months after the last successful breeding, or 5 months after an unsuccessful one.

== Behavior ==
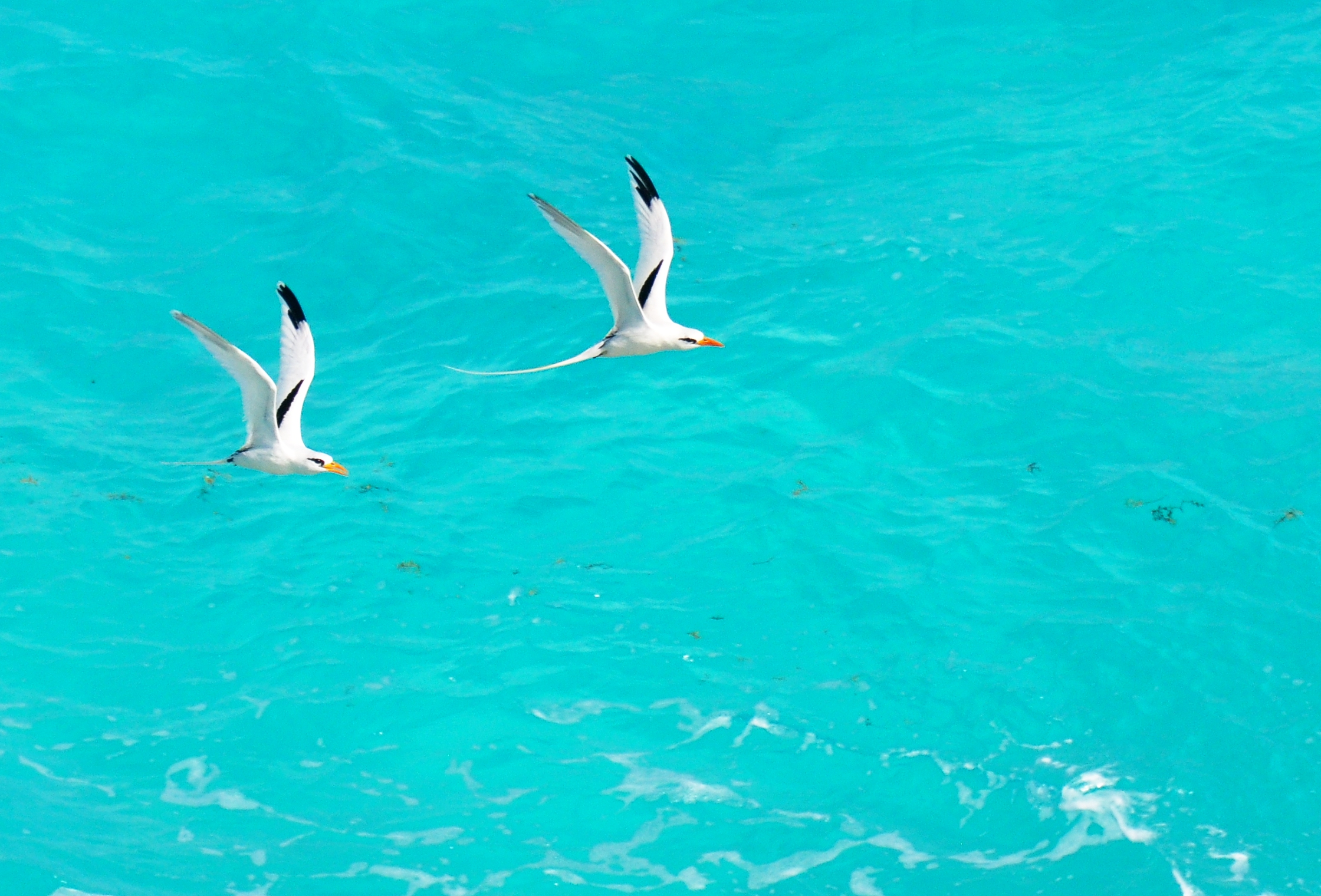
A pair in flight

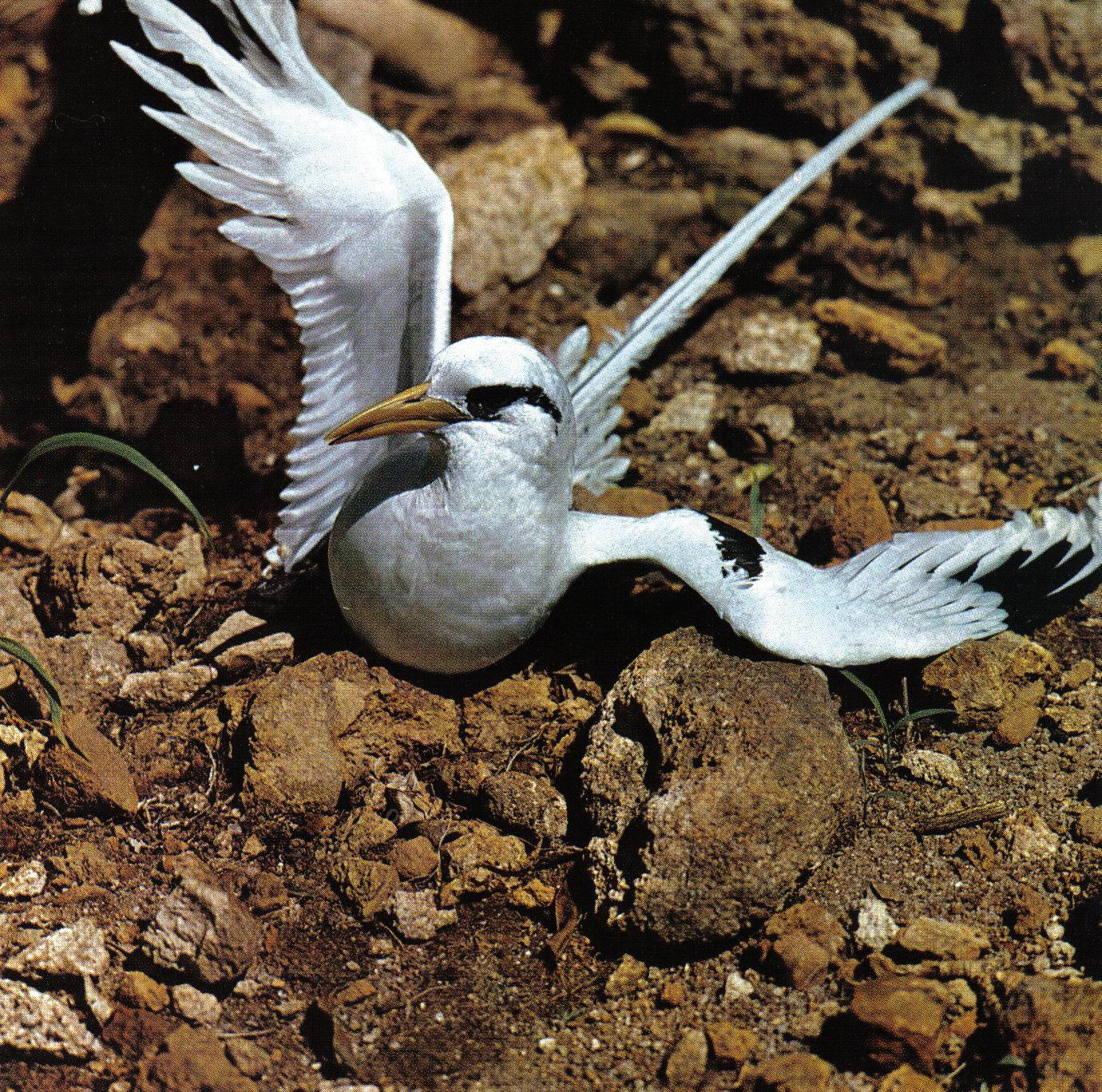
In the Seychelles

The white-tailed tropicbird feeds mainly on flying fish, squid and crabs. It catches its prey by diving from height of up to 20 meters, as do gannets. However, flying fish are caught in flight. It usually feeds in pairs. Prey is often detected by hovering above the surface as the bird swallows it before taking off.

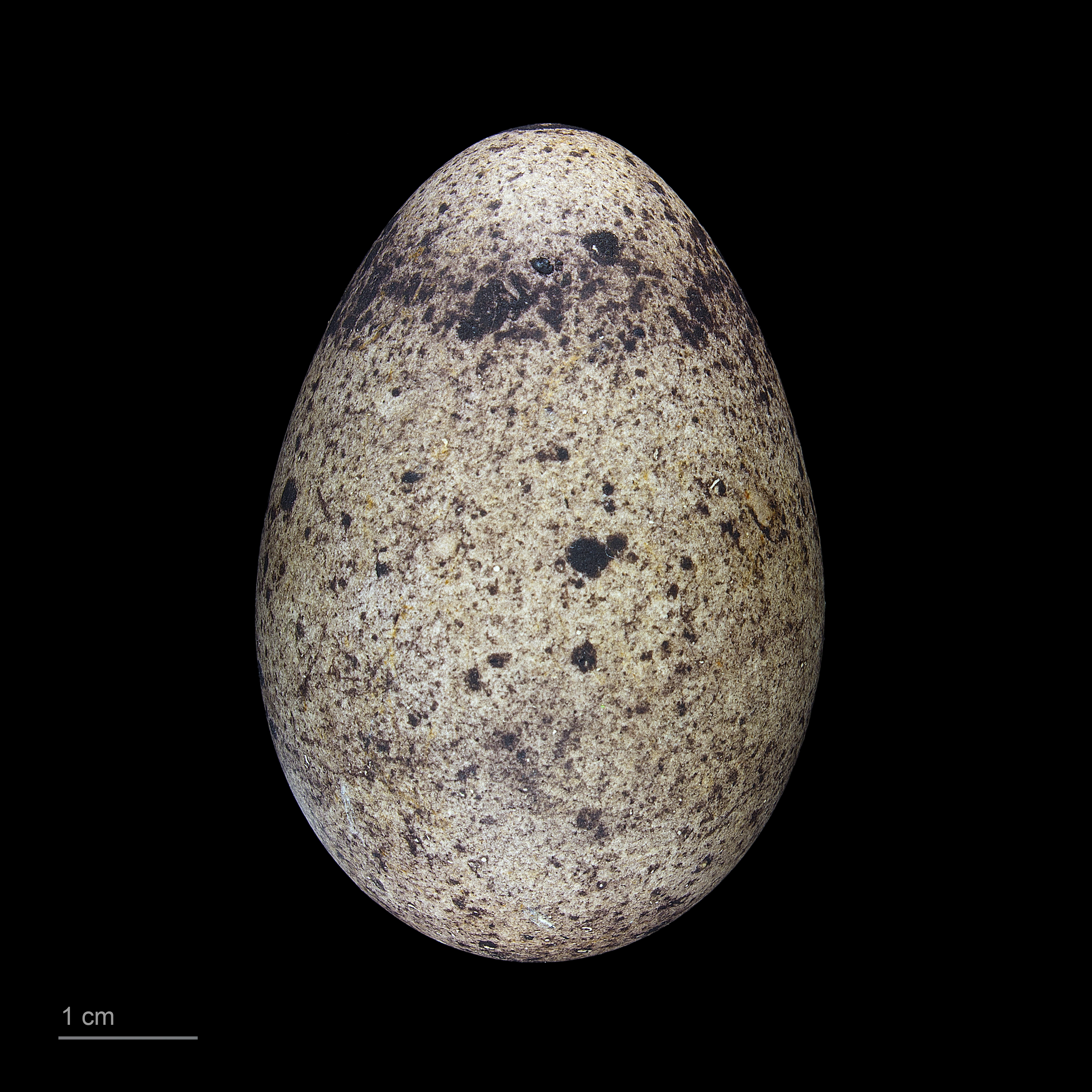
Phaethon lepturus egg, MHNT

== Conservation status ==
Population trends are unknown. In Mexico it is not under any category of protection, and no specific conservation programs for these tropicbirds are known. However, the species is found in various conservation programs as an American waterfowl. It is recommended to conduct studies on the biology of this species at sea, as well as monitoring of breeding colonies. Globally it is considered a species of Least Concern.

== Folklore ==
The ancient Chamorro people called the white-tailed tropicbird utak or itak, and believed that when it screamed over a house it meant that someone would soon die or that an unmarried girl was pregnant. Its call would kill anyone who did not believe in it. Chamorro fishermen would find schools of fish by watching them.
