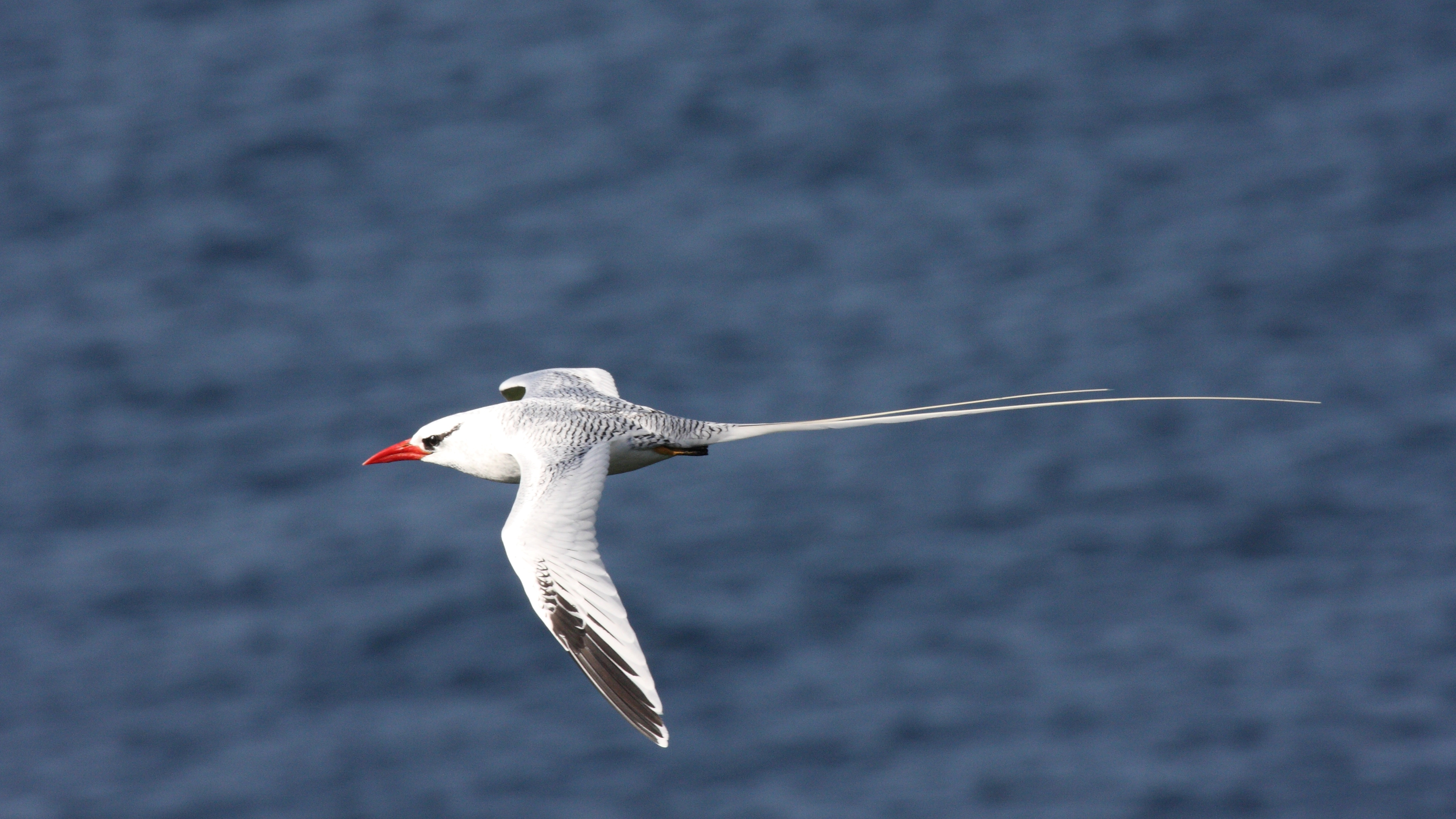
- Red-billed tropicbird

Scientific classification
- Kingdom: Animalia
- Phylum: Chordata
- Class: Aves
- Clade: Eurypygimorphae
- Order: Phaethontiformes; Sharpe, 1891

Families
- Phaethontidae; †Prophaethontidae; †Clymenoptilon; †Phaethusavis; †Novacaesareala?; †Zhylgaia

= Phaethontiformes =

Phaethontiformes Temporal range: Early Paleocene - present Possible Maastrichtian record

Order of birds

The Phaethontiformes /ˌfeɪ.ɪˈθɒntɪfɔːrmiːz/ are an order of birds. They contain one extant family, the tropicbirds (Phaethontidae), and one extinct family Prophaethontidae from the early Cenozoic. Several fossil genera have been described, with well-preserved fossils known as early as the Paleocene. The group's origins may lie even earlier if the enigmatic waterbird Novacaesareala from the latest Cretaceous or earliest Paleocene of New Jersey is considered a tropicbird.

Many phaethontiform fossil taxa are known from the Paleocene and Eocene, but the fossil record becomes much more scant after the Oligocene. This suggests that around this time, the group may have moved out of the nearshore habitats where they were easier to fossilize and evolved the pelagic lifestyle that is still retained by the few surviving members today.

The tropicbirds were traditionally grouped in the order Pelecaniformes, which contained the pelicans, cormorants and shags, darters, gannets and boobies and frigatebirds; in the Sibley-Ahlquist taxonomy, the Pelecaniformes were united with other groups into a large "Ciconiiformes". More recently this grouping has been found to be massively non-monophyletic (missing closer relatives of its distantly related groups) and split again. Microscopic analysis of eggshell structure by Konstantin Mikhailov in 1995 found that the eggshells of tropicbirds lacked the covering of thick microglobular material of other Pelecaniformes.

Some early studies in the last decade suggested Phaethontiformes were distantly related to Procellariiformes, but since 2004 they have been placed in Metaves, or in a lineage with no affinities with Procellariiformes, by the results of most recent molecular studies. Jarvis, et al.'s 2014 paper "Whole-genome analyses resolve early branches in the tree of life of modern birds" aligns the Phaethontiformes most closely with the sunbittern and the kagu of the Eurypygiformes, with these two clades forming the sister group of the "core water birds", the Aequornithes, and the Metaves hypothesis abandoned.
