= MPL =

MPL may refer to:

== Arts and entertainment ==
- MPL Communications (or McCartney Publishing Limited), a music publisher
- Patrologia Latina, a collection of manuscripts compiled in the 19th century
- Puri Lukisan Museum, a gallery of Balinese art in Bali, Indonesia
- Mobile Premier League, an Indian online gaming platform

== Library bodies ==
- Markham Public Library, Ontario, Canada
- Memphis Public Library, Memphis, US
- Minneapolis Public Library, Minnesota, US
- Milwaukee Public Library, Wisconsin, US
- Milton Public Library, Wisconsin, US

== Science and technology ==
=== Biology and medicine ===
- MPL (gene), which encodes the myeloproliferative leukemia protein (thrombopoietin receptor)
- Marfanoid–progeroid–lipodystrophy syndrome
- Medial patellar luxation, a medical condition in dogs
- Monophosphoryl lipid A, a derivative of the lipid A molecule

=== Computing ===
==== Copyright licenses ====
- Microsoft Public License
- Mozilla Public License

==== Programming ====
- Computer multitasking#Multiprogramming Limit, the degree of multiprogramming
- Matplotlib, a Python plotting library
- MIDI Programming Language
- PL/I, programming language
- Metaprogramming library, in Boost (C++ libraries)
- .mpl, a type of Perl module
- Mathematical Programming Language, for high-level optimization modeling

==== Other uses in computing ====
- Messenger Plus! Live, a software add-on for Windows Live Messenger
- .mpl, a Maconomy print layout file

=== Other uses in science and technology ===
- Magnetic path length
- Mars Polar Lander, a robotic spacecraft launched by NASA
- Max Planck Institute for the Science of Light, Erlangen, Germany
- Maximum parcel level, in meteorology and climatology
- Multi-photon lithography, a process used in microfabrication
- Walther MP, a series of submachine guns produced in Germany from 1963 to 1987

== Sports ==
- Malaysia Premier League, a second-tier association football league in Malaysia
- Maltese Premier League, top division association football league in Malta
- Mandatory Palestine League, defunct top division association football league in Palestine
- Mexican Pacific League, a winter baseball league in Mexico
- Miyazaki Phoenix League, an autumnal baseball league in Japan
- Mangalore Premier League, a cricket league in Karnataka, India

== Transportation ==
- Marple railway station, England (GBR code: MPL)
- Minnesota Prairie Line, a railroad in Central Minnesota
- Montpellier-Méditerranée Airport, Montpellier, France (IATA code: MPL)
- Multi-crew Pilot Licence, an airline training program

== Other uses ==
- Malian Party of Labour, a political party in Mali
- Marginal product of labor (MP_{L}), in economics
- Movimento Passe Livre, a Brazilian social movement

== See also ==
- Mpls (disambiguation)
