= MPLS (disambiguation) =

MPLS, or Multiprotocol Label Switching, is a network routing scheme based on labels identifying paths.

MPLS or Mpls may also refer to:

- Mpls., the city of Minneapolis, Minnesota, US
- Mathematical, Physical and Life Sciences Division, one of the divisions of the University of Oxford, UK
- "MPLS Song", a 1991 song by Pinhead Gunpowder off the EP Tründle and Spring

== See also ==
- MPL (disambiguation)
- MLPS (disambiguation)
