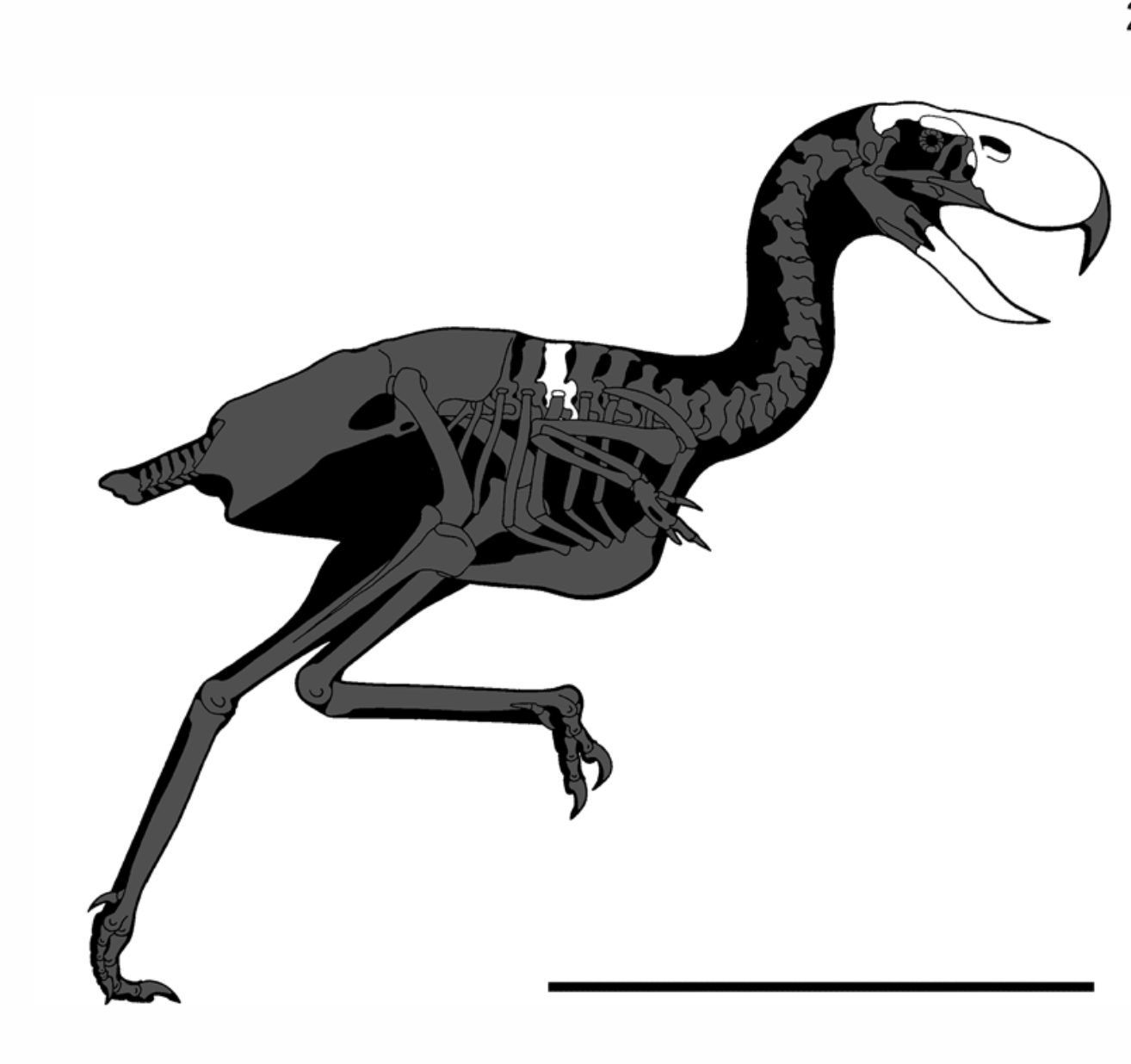
- Skeletal reconstruction, with known remains of MPEF-PV 11355-56 in white

Scientific classification
- Kingdom: Animalia
- Phylum: Chordata
- Class: Aves
- Order: Cariamiformes
- Family: †Phorusrhacidae
- Subfamily: †Phorusrhacinae
- Genus: †Phorusrhacos; Ameghino, 1887

Type species
- †Phorusrhacos longissimus Ameghino, 1887

Synonyms
- Genus synonymy: Callornis Ameghino, 1895; Darwinornis Moreno & Mercerat, 1891; Eucallornis Ameghino, 1901; Liornis Ameghino, 1895; Owenornis Moreno & Mercerat, 1891; Phororhacos Ameghino, 1889; Stereornis Moreno & Mercerat, 1891; Titanornis? Mercerat, 1893; Species synonymy: Callornis giganteus Ameghino, 1895 (in partim); Darwinornis copei Moreno & Mercerat, 1891; Darwinornis socialis Moreno & Mercerat, 1891; Darwinornis zittelli Moreno & Mercerat, 1891; Eucallornis giganteus Ameghino, 1901; Liornis minor Dolgopol de Saez, 1927; Mesembriornis quatrefragesi Moreno & Mercerat, 1891; Mesembriornis studeri Moreno & Mercerat, 1891; Owenornis affinis Moreno & Mercerat, 1891; Owenornis lydekkeri Moreno & Mercerat, 1891; Phororhacos longissimus Ameghino 1889 (lapsus calami); Phororhacos platygnathus Ameghino 1891; Phororhacos sehuensis Ameghino, 1891; Phororhacos shenensis Ameghino, 1891; Stereornis gaundryi Moreno & Mercerat, 1891; Stereornis rollieri Moreno & Mercerat, 1891; Titanornis mirabilis? Mercerat, 1893

= Phorusrhacos =

Phorusrhacos Temporal range: Early to Middle Miocene (Burdigalian to Serravallian) 18–13 Ma

Extinct genus of birds

Phorusrhacos (meaning "bearer of scars" or "bearer of wrinkles") is an extinct genus of phorusrhacid, a group of predatory flightless birds commonly known as terror birds. It lived during the Early to Middle Miocene, approximately 18–13 million years ago, in what is now southern Argentina. The first fossil attributed to the genus, an isolated fragment of the mandible (lower jaw), was discovered in 1887 by Argentine paleontologist Carlos Ameghino in sediments of the Santa Cruz Formation in Santa Cruz Province, Argentina. Later that year, his brother, Florentino Ameghino, formally described the specimen as the new genus and species Phorusrhacos longissimus. Florentino initially interpreted the fossil as belonging to a giant, toothless sloth and assigned the genus to its own family, Phorusrhacidae. In 1891, however, Argentine naturalist Francisco Moreno recognized that the specimen was avian rather than mammalian. Since its initial description, Phorusrhacos has become one of the best-known phorusrhacid genera, with fossils documented from numerous localities in southern Argentina.

Phorusrhacos is estimated to have stood 1.4–1.9 meters (4.6–6.2 ft) tall and weighed around 93 kilograms (205 lb), placing it among the largest known phorusrhacids. Despite its size, it was more lithe and cursorial (built for running) than the similarly sized Kelenken and Devincenzia. Like other phorusrhacids, it had a tall, elongated skull with a sharply hooked beak. The skull was laterally compressed, particularly when viewed from the front. Its cervical vertebrae were short, thick, and broad, features that may have strengthened the neck for delivering powerful strikes. The hindlimbs were long and slender, with the tarsometatarsus measuring approximately 70% the length of the tibiotarsus and possessing a relative slender shaft.

During the Miocene, the region of present-day Santa Cruz Province was characterized by a mosaic of savanna-like grasslands, shrublands, and woodlands. At the time, South America remained geographically isolated from other continents, supporting a distinctive assemblage of mammalian, avian, and reptilian fauna before the Great American Interchange. Phorusrhacos occupied an apex predator role in these Santacrucian ecosystems, likely preying on a variety of native mammals, such as ground sloths, notoungulates, and litopterns.

== Discovery and naming ==
=== Discovery and competition ===
==== Initial misidentification ====
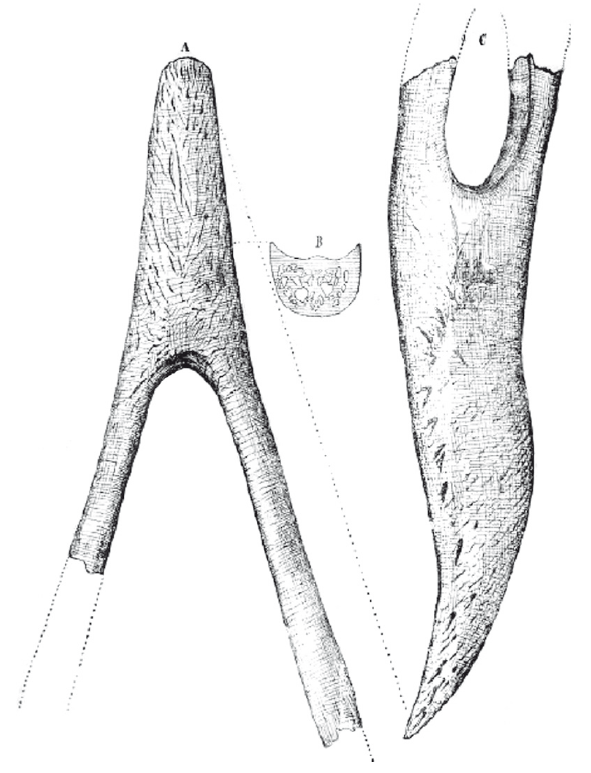
Illustration of the holotype (MLP-118) from Ameghino (1891)

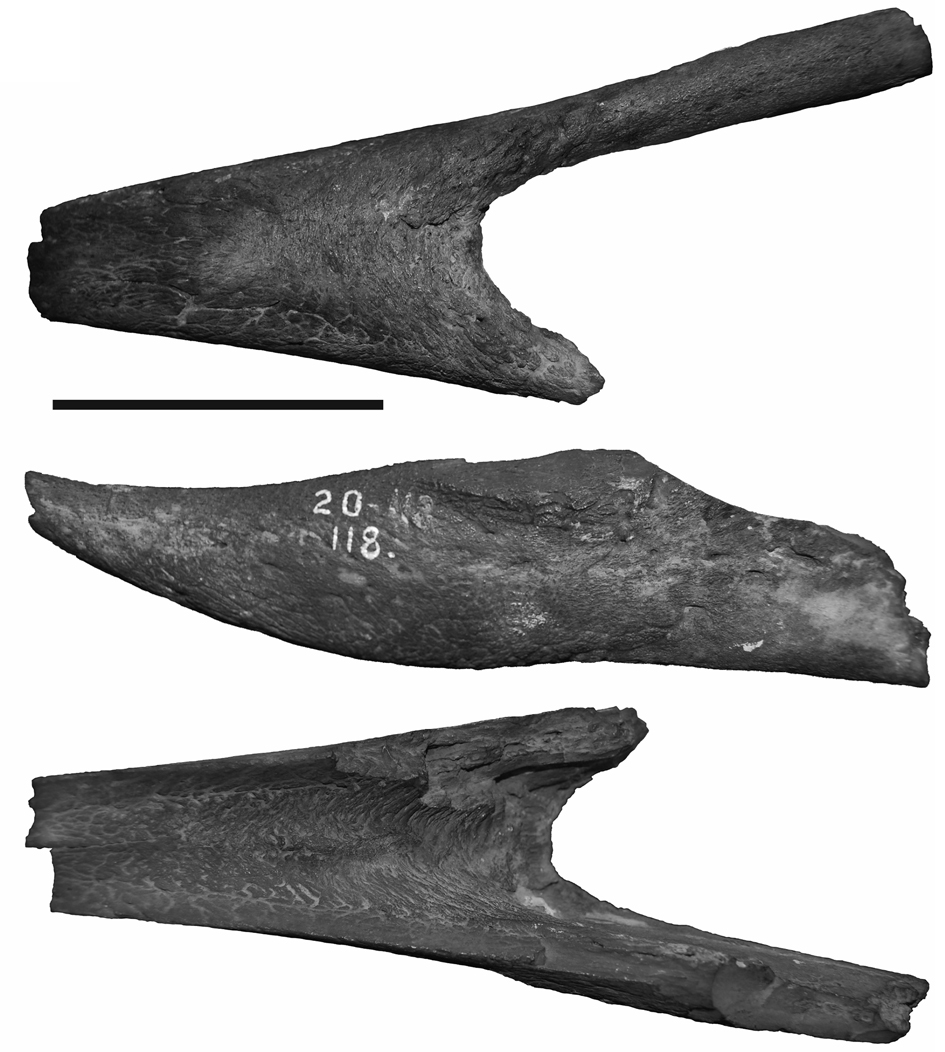
Photograph of the holotype from Degrange and colleagues (2019)

The taxonomic history of Phorusrhacos is muddled due to the fragmentary nature of fossils, few of which overlap, and little consensus between scientists. In the 19th century, scientific interest in the rich "Tertiary" (now called the Neogene) fossil sites of Argentina boomed. Patagonian fossils were first discovered by British naturalist Charles Darwin in the 1830s during his voyage on HMS Beagle. However, they were largely ignored until Argentine paleontologist Francisco Pascasio Moreno founded the Museo de La Plata in 1884. This later boom included exploration by two Argentine paleontologists: Florentino Ameghino and Francisco Pascasio Moreno. Their discoveries comprised thousands of fossils from Cenozoic fossil deposits throughout Patagonia and central Argentina. Initially, Moreno hired Florentino and his brother, Carlos Ameghino, as staff at the MLP in 1887; Florentino operated as a researcher and Deputy Director, while his brother conducted expeditions and assisted with preparation.

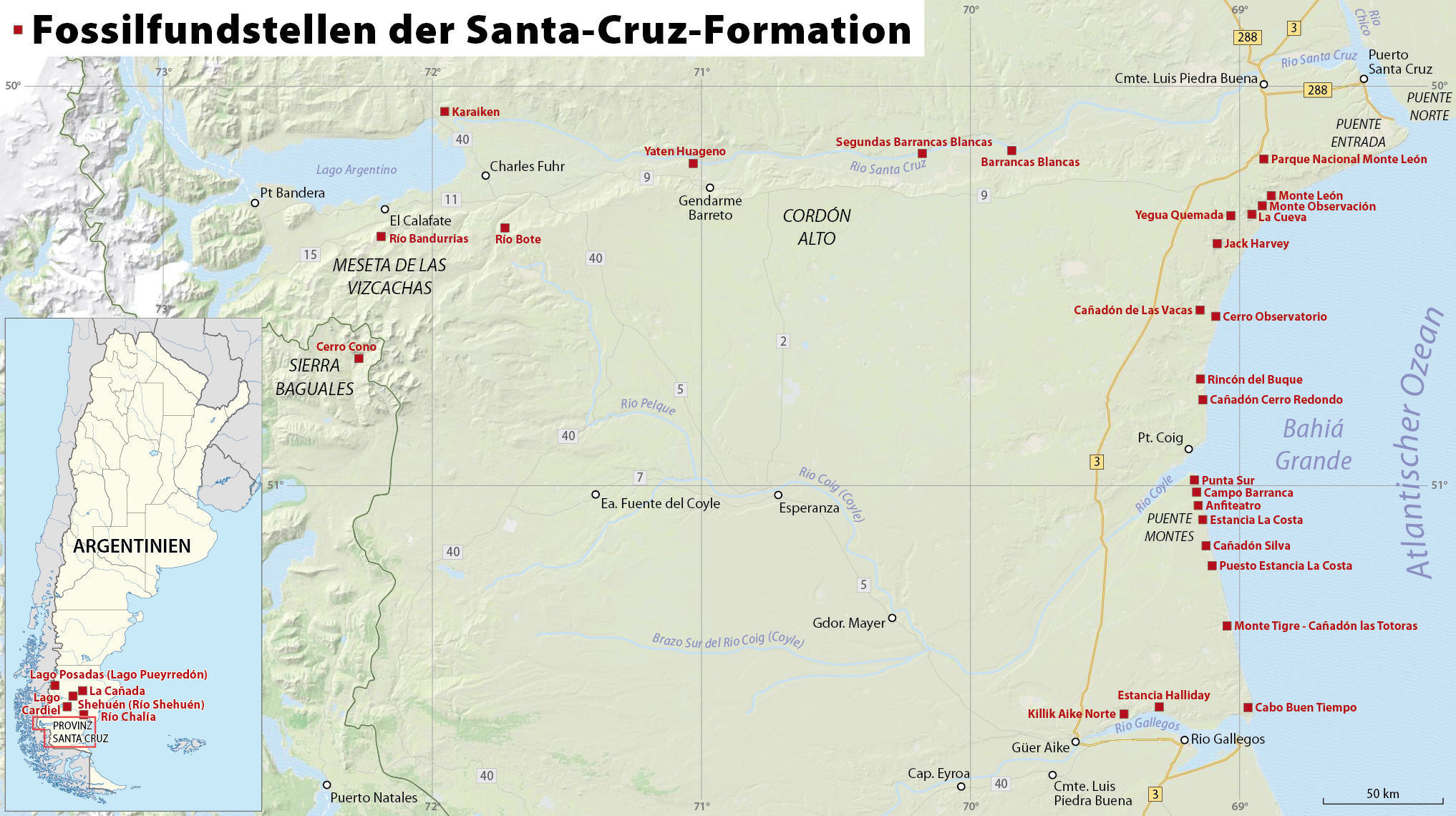
Map of fossil localities of the Santa Cruz Formation, including those along the Santa Cruz River where the holotype was found

The first known discovery of Phorusrhacos was made in 1887 by Carlos Ameghino during an expedition to an outcrop of the Miocene-aged Santa Cruz Formation along the Santa Cruz River in Santa Cruz Province, Argentine Patagonia. This formation dates to the Santacrucian South American Land Mammal Age (a series of mammalian fauna-based geologic ages), which lasted from 22 to 16 million years ago, and preserves a diverse array of endemic birds, mammals, reptiles, and more. This trip alone produced hundreds of fossils, which were described as over 120 novel species of fossil mammals in 1887. The descriptions produced by Florentino were short and vague, though he would go on to publish a more in-depth paper on his new taxa. Along the Santa Cruz River, Carlos unearthed an isolated, incomplete edentulous (toothless) mandible (lower jaw), which was later deposited at the MLP. Florentino believed this fossil belonged to a new genus and species of edentate mammal, around the size of Mylodon, which he named Phorusrhacos longissimus. He chose the mandible (specimen number MLP-118) as the holotype (name-bearing) specimen of P. longissimus. The etymology of Phorusrhacos is convoluted. Ameghino did not explain the etymology of the generic name Phorusrhacos or the specific name longissimus. The former is derived from the Greek -φόρος, (-phoros), meaning "bearer" in word combinations, and ῥάκος, (rhakos), "rag" or "wrinkle", probably in reference to the wrinkled jaw surface of the holotype. This creates the literal meaning "wrinkle bearer (jaw)" for Phorusrhacos. When the original derivation was no longer understood, other translations were proposed, such as the literal translation "rag-thief" and "branch-holder" based on mistaken assumption that the name was intended to derive from the Greek rhakis, "branch". The specific name (longissimus) means "very long" in Latin, again in reference to the holotype.

However, the relationship between Moreno and Florentino Ameghino deteriorated, culminating in the Ameghinos' resignation from the MLP in 1888 and the establishment of their own collection. Florentino was replaced by Swiss paleontologist Alcides Mercerat, who later wrote several works on phorusrhacids. Operating independently of any institutions until 1902, the Ameghinos competed with Moreno and the Museo de La Plata to discover and describe as many new fossils as they could. This led to the description of many genera and species based on fragmentary, undiagnostic, or poorly described material. By now, Ameghino was the most famous paleontologist in Argentina at that time, even getting support from the president of Argentina, while Moreno worked under state support. In 1889, Ameghino published a detailed monograph on Argentine fossil mammals, including Phorusrhacos. He went into greater detail on its anatomy, classification, and attempted to amend the generic name to Phororhacos. The name Phororhacos continued to be used for decades.

In a 1967 work on fossil birds, American paleontologist Pierce Brodkorb recognized that Phororhacos was the improper name according to the rules of the International Code of Zoological Nomenclature (ICZN) as names cannot be emended without a proper appeal. Therefore, Phorusrhacos longissimus would be the correct binomial name. Through a 1989 appeal to the ICZN, Argentine researchers Luis M. Chiappe and Miguel F. Soria sought to conserve the use of Phororhacos and suppress Phorusrhacos as the generic name. A response was published in 1991 by American ornithologist Storrs L. Olson, who stated that Phorusrhacos was the name in current use because it appeared in papers published by Brodkorb. He went on to write that the correct family-group name would be Phorusrhacidae, even though Ameghino (1891) used the family name Phororhacosidae. After judging the ruling, the ICZN Commission voted to reject the names Phororhacos and Phororhacosidae.

==== Reinterpretation as a bird ====
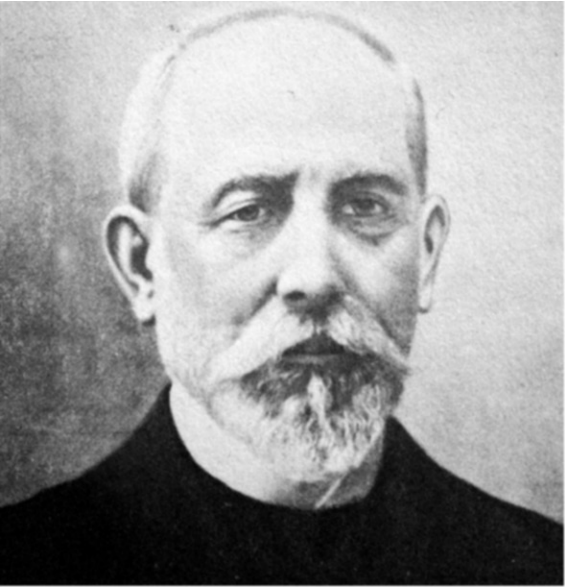
Florentino Ameghino, the describer of Phorusrhacos

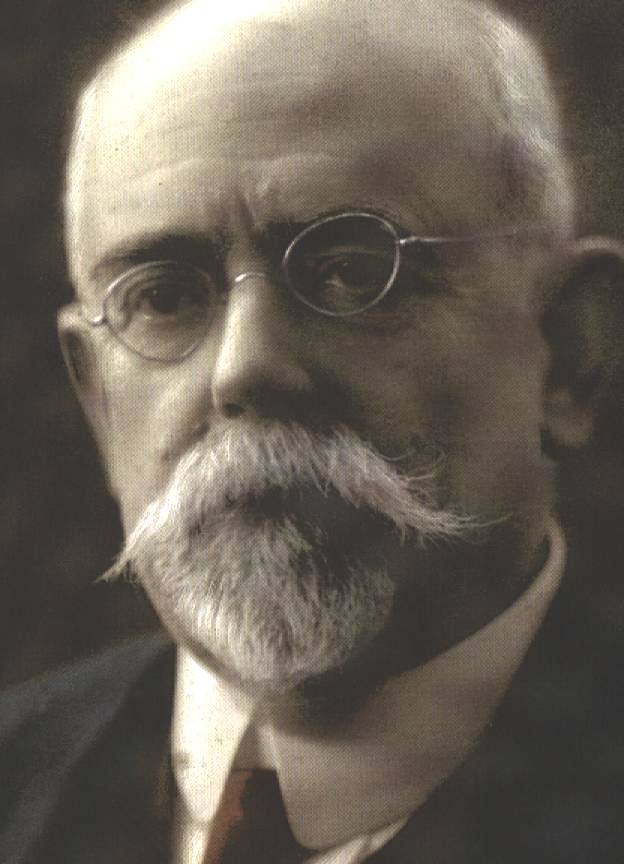
Francisco Moreno, Ameghino's competitor

At the same time as Ameghino's discoveries, Moreno and the MLP sent out its own teams to explore the Santacrucian deposits of Patagonia. In 1888, Moreno mentioned that fossils of large birds had been found in Monte Hermoso by these expeditions. The next year, he classified them as belonging to two new genera of lamellirostral web-footed birds: Mesembriornis and Palaeociconia. Several fossils of the former are now believed to belong to Phorusrhacos, and this demonstrated the existence of giant birds in Patagonia. This led Carlos Ameghino to reconsider the classification of Phorusrhacos; in an 1890 letter to his brother, he was the first to propose that Phorusrhacos is a bird, based on Moreno's discoveries. However, Florentino reaffirmed that it was mammalian in his response. In 1891, Moreno and Mercerat published a monograph describing many of the fossils found on earlier expeditions. They named several genera and species, such as Owenornis and Stereornis, based on fragmentary material. Furthermore, they named the order Stereornithes to include the new taxa, however this name is no longer in use. Unlike Ameghino's work, this monograph features figures and illustrations, giving a better impression of the anatomy of "stereornithine" birds. This featured a figure of the P. longissimus holotype, which they misinterpreted as being a premaxilla (front jaw bone), and assigned to a bird rather than an edentate mammal. Later studies have considered Stereornithes a synonym of Phorusrhacidae. Many of the genera and species described in the paper are synonyms of P. longissimus.

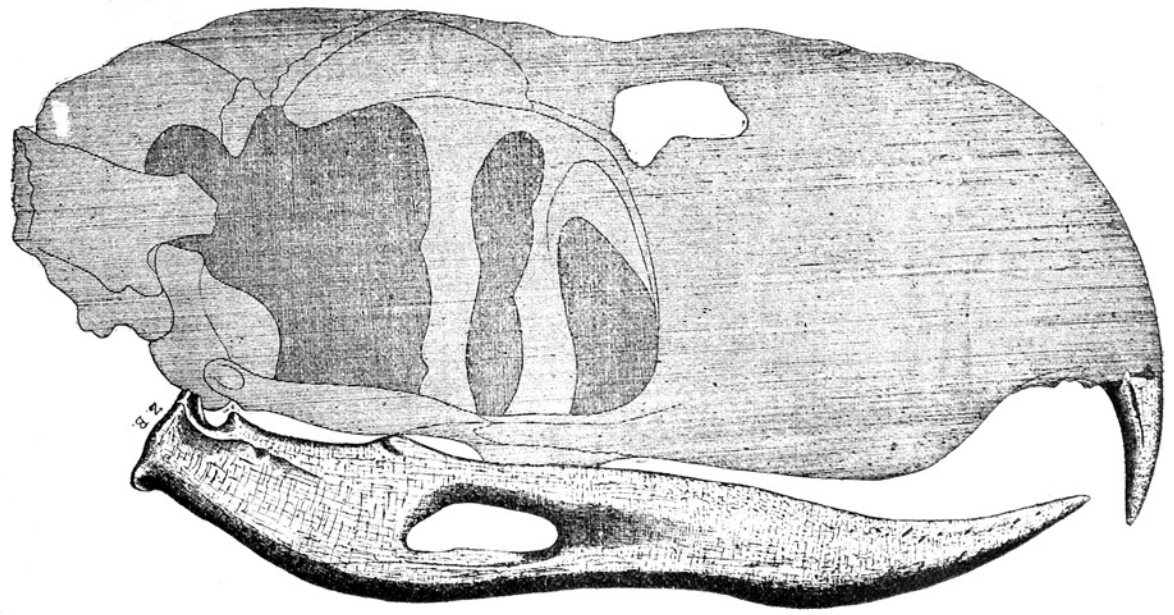
Known elements of NHMUK-A529, including Carlos Ameghino's sketch of the destroyed skull

In 1891, Ameghino named the genus and species Tolmodus inflatus, which he believed was also a ground sloth, on the basis of a skull beak fragment. That same year, Carlos unearthed a poorly preserved skull and mandible (NHMUK-A529) of Phorusrhacos from a locality in Santa Cruz. This skull was noted to measure 69 centimetres (27 in) in length in the field, and it soon fragmented, leaving only the mandible, beak tip, and a fragment from the supraorbital process of the frontal (a ridge forming the top part of the orbit) to be recovered. The discovery of this skull may have been the catalyst for Ameghino writing a comprehensive description of Phorusrhacos and correcting his previous error by classifying it as a bird. In this paper, Ameghino figured and described the holotype of P. longissimus in detail, assigned Tolmodus to Phorusrhacos, and named additional Phorusrhacos species. In 1895, he described the mandible in detail and noted the discovery of the fragmented skull, including an illustration. Additionally, the paper had illustrations and detailed analysis of many P. longissimus fossils for the first time, including vertebrae and limb bones.

In 1891, Ameghino considered Phororhacosidae (now Phorusrhacidae) to be in Edentata, an antique name for a clade believed to include mammals like sloths, pangolins, and armadillos.. Not knowing it was avian, Ameghino theorized that Phorusrhacos had a bird or turtle-like keratin sheath on its jaws. In response to Moreno and Mercerat (1891), Ameghino stated that many of the species they had named were synonyms of Phorusrhacos and were inadequately described. In the same paper, Ameghino classified Phorusrhacidae within Ratites, a group of giant birds like ostriches (Struthio), Aepyornis and Dinornis. In an effort to discredit Moreno, Ameghino went on to claim that Carlos was the first to recognize the existence of giant birds in the Tertiary of South America in 1891, when in actuality Moreno had in 1888. Between leaving the MLP and becoming the director of the Museo Argentino de Ciencias Naturales in 1902, Ameghino struggled financially, only supported by sales of fossils to Europeans and a small book and stationery business. Additionally, Ameghino's interest in phorusrhacids waned at this point in his career. As a result, Ameghino sold much of his respective fossil collections to the Natural History Museum of London between 1895 and 1896, though he later regretted the sale. Moreno later left the MLP in 1906 as he was against its merge with La Plata University. The last paper on "stereornithes" was published by Mercerat in 1899, who later became a surveyor. While Carlos continued to collect Patagonian fossils until 1902, after 1893 he never mentioned any significant phorusrhacid discoveries. By 1911, Ameghino had died, and Moreno had retired, leaving behind a legacy of convoluted phorusrhacid taxonomy.

=== Later study ===
==== American expeditions ====
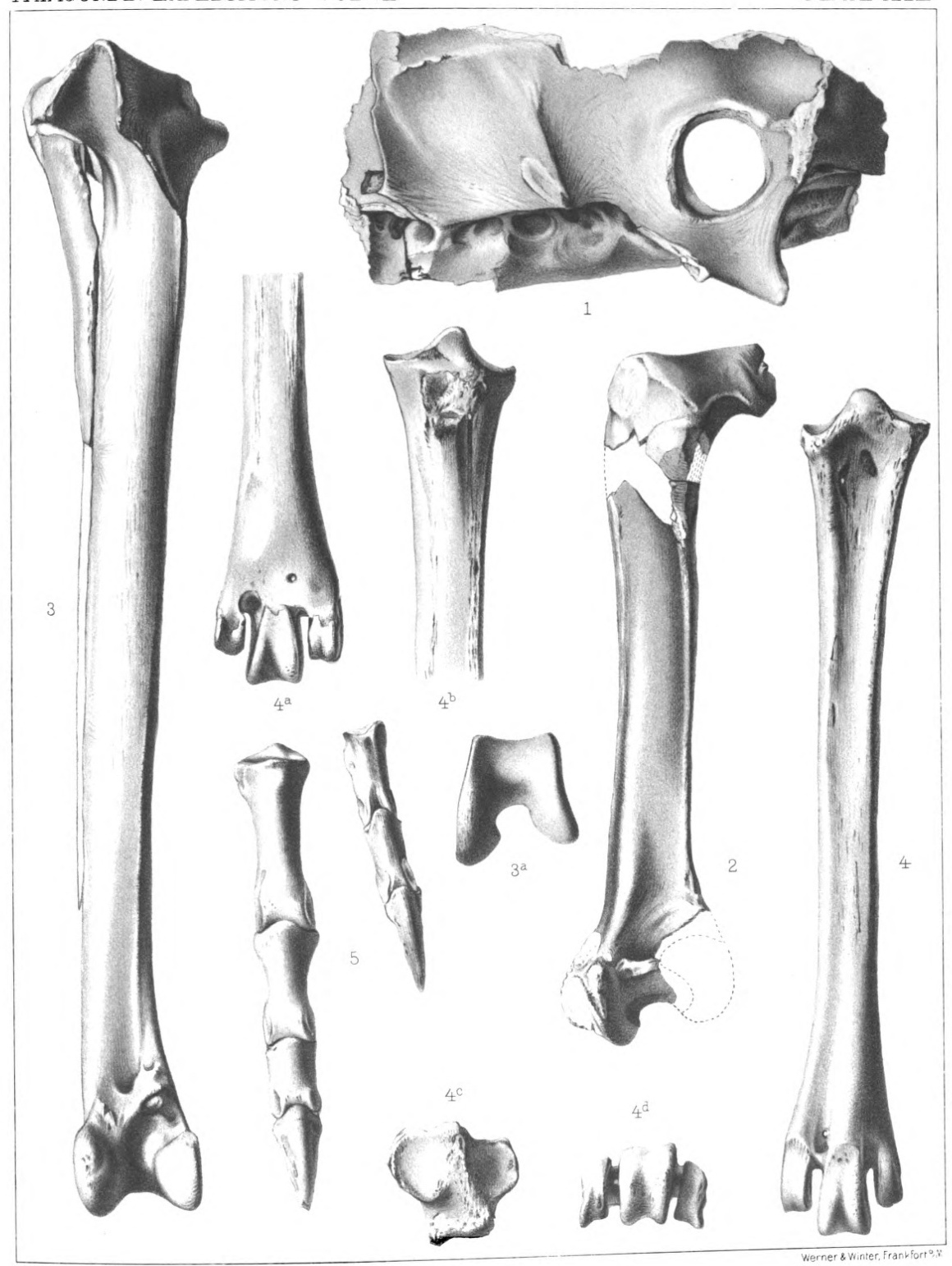
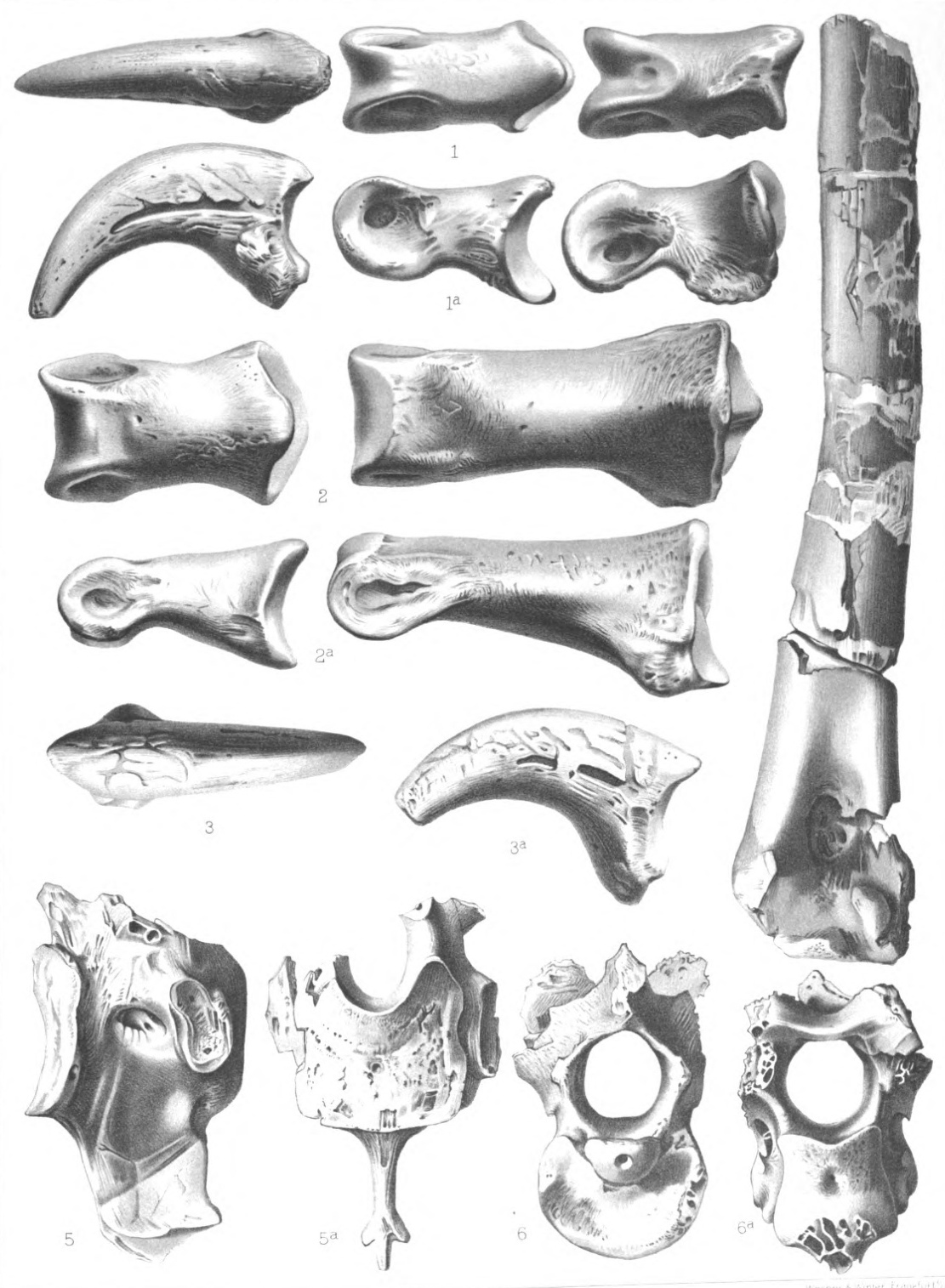
Remains of P. longissimus unearthed by the Princeton University expeditions, including hindlimb (AMNH 9264; left) and pes (AMNH 9497; right) material

At the close of the 19th century, American universities and institutions began taking an interest in the Neogene fauna of Patagonia. Inspired by Ameghino's papers and descriptions, these universities and institutions sought to establish their own collections of Santacrucian mammals and birds, including those of Phorusrhacos. Between 1896 and 1899, Princeton University students, under the leadership of American paleontologist John Bell Hatcher, led a series of expeditions to the same outcrops in Santa Cruz Province. Princeton was joined by a team from the American Museum of Natural History on the last of these expeditions, altogether collecting a significant amount of new fossil bird and mammal material. Furthermore, in 1902, American professor William B. Scott visited the MLP and Ameghino's collections to photograph and review the taxa named by Ameghino, Moreno, and Mercerat. His studies, along with those of Hatcher, American paleontologist William John Sinclair, and others, culminated in a series of monographs published between 1903 and 1912 by Princeton University. Although they reviewed Ameghino's mammal taxa in detail, their description of some of the phorusrhacid remains was brief. Meanwhile, in 1926, American paleontologist Marcus Farr traveled to the Natural History Museum of London in order to study the Ameghino collection, with the assistance of Dr. F. A. Bather, the museum's curator.

In 1932, Sinclair and Farr described the newly found phorusrhacid material in detail, assigning much of it to Pelecyornis (a synonym of Psilopterus) and Phorusrhacos. In their study, they briefly touched on the convoluted taxonomy of the clade, stating that there were likely too many genera and species of stereornithes named. Furthermore, Sinclair and Farr noted that Phorusrhacidae may be a paraphyletic clade, a conclusion not supported by later authors. From a locality 10 miles north of Cape Fairweather, Santa Cruz, members of the expedition unearthed an associated postcranial skeleton from a phorusrhacid (AMNH 9264) consisting of an incomplete pelvis, right femur (thigh bone), tibiotarsus (shin bone), tarsometatarsus, and pes (foot). Sinclair and Farr (1932) did not assign it to a specific species, instead referring to it simply as Phororhacos sp., while Alvarenga and Höfling (2003) assigned it to Patagornis marshi. Another specimen, AMNH 9497, was provisionally considered Phororhacos sp. until Alvarenga and Höfling (2003) identified it as P. longissimus. Other remains collected by the expedition, such as a nearly complete left tarsometatarsus (AMNH 9146), have been assigned to P. longissimus as well. One specimen, an incomplete left humerus (deposited at the Yale Peabody Museum under YPM-PVVU 15866) was initially assigned to P. sp. but is now the holotype of Dryornis hatcheri, a cathartid.

==== Revision ====
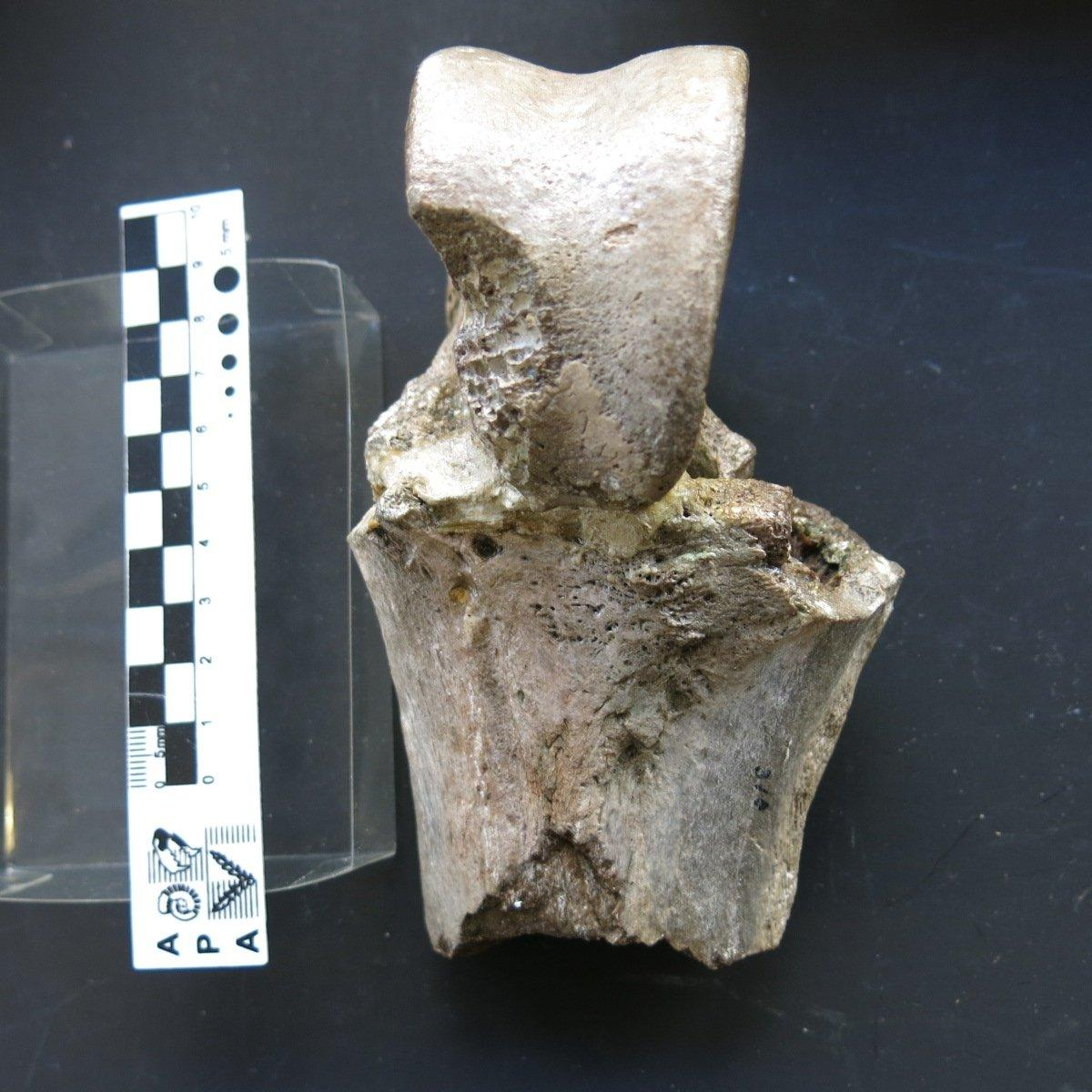
Tarsometatarsus of Liornis floweri, a synonym of P. longissimus named by Dolgopol de Sáez (1927)

In 1927, Argentine paleontologist Mathilde Dolgopol de Sáez published a revision of Argentine phorusrhacid taxa named by Ameghino, Moreno, and Mercerat. Here, she described a new species of phorusrhacid, Liornis minor, which is now a synonym of P. longissimus. Additionally, she considered all other phorusrhacids named up to that point, besides Brontornis, to be synonyms of Phorusrhacos. Dolgopol de Sáez believed the genus had five valid species: P. longissimus, P. sehuensis, P. milne-edwarsi, P. inflatus, and P. delicatus. A 1967 paper by American paleontologist Pierce Brodkorb greatly revised the taxonomy of Phorusrhacidae. Here, he recognized that Phorusrhacos, not Phororhacos, was the valid generic name and he reduced the genus to just P. longissimus. Many of Brodkorb's conclusions have been supported by later studies.

In 2019, Argentine paleontologist Federico Degrange and colleagues described an associated skull roof, rostrum, and incomplete mandible (deposited at the Museum of Paleontology Egidio Feruglio under MPEF-PV 11356) that had been unearthed from an outcrop of the Santa Cruz Formation southeast of Lago Belgrano in Santa Cruz Province. This site lies near the Chilean border and constitutes the westernmost discovery of Phorusrhacos yet published. Nearby at another site, Puesto Estancia La Costa, an isolated dorsal (back) vertebra (MPEF-PV 11355) was collected as well. This vertebra was provisionally assigned to Phorusrhacinae indet., but likely comes from Phorusrhacos itself. MPEF-PV 11356 was the first discovery of relatively complete Phorusrhacos skull material since 1891 and has provided a detailed look at the anatomy of the taxon. Two years later, Argentine paleontologist Sergio Vizcaíno and colleagues described several fossils, including an ungual phalanx from P. longissimus, from the early-mid Miocene-aged Cerro Boleadoras Formation in Meseta del Lago Buenos Aires in Santa Cruz Province, Argentina. This was the first discovery of Phorusrhacos remains from this formation and expanded the known distribution of the taxon.

=== Synonyms and reclassified species ===
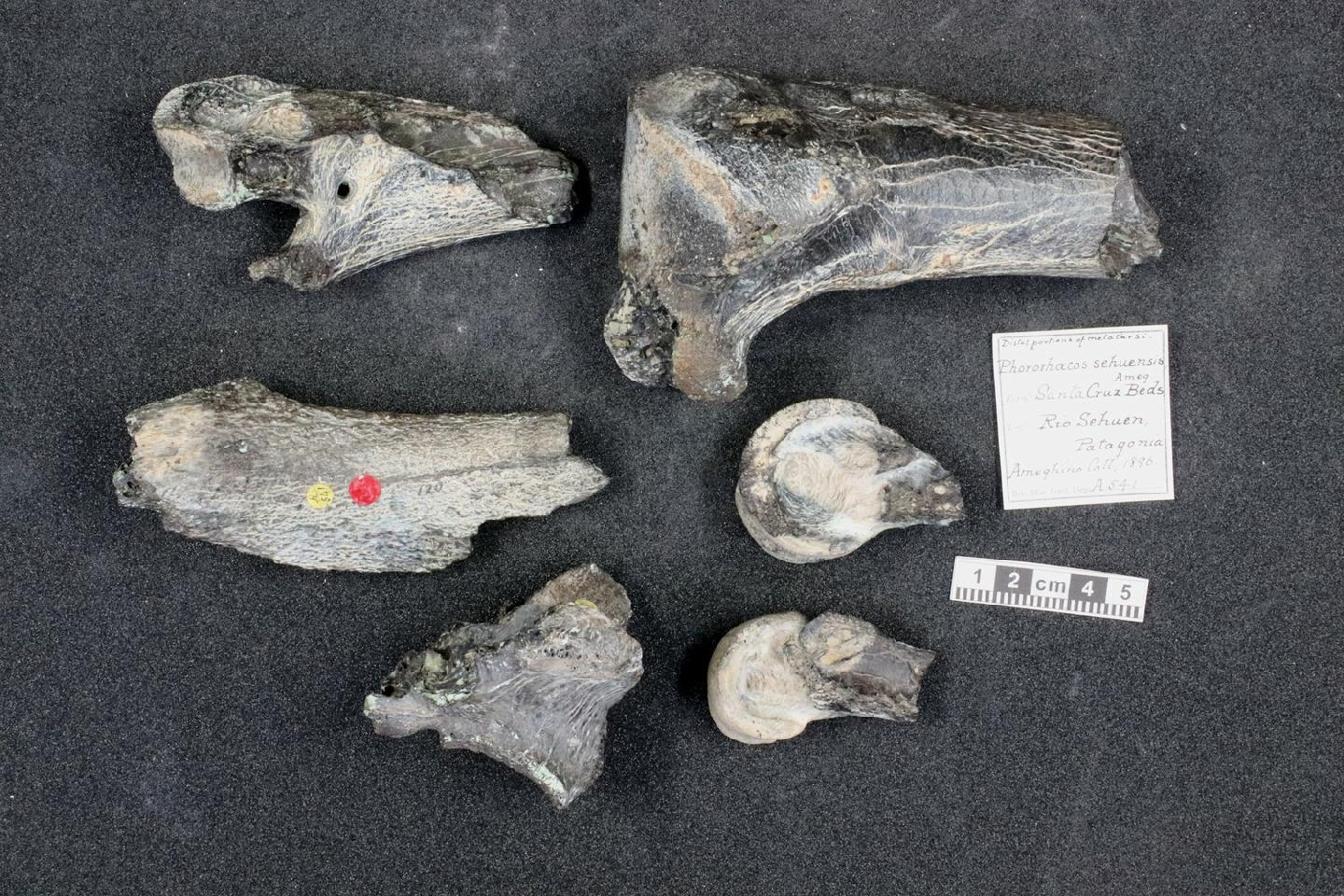
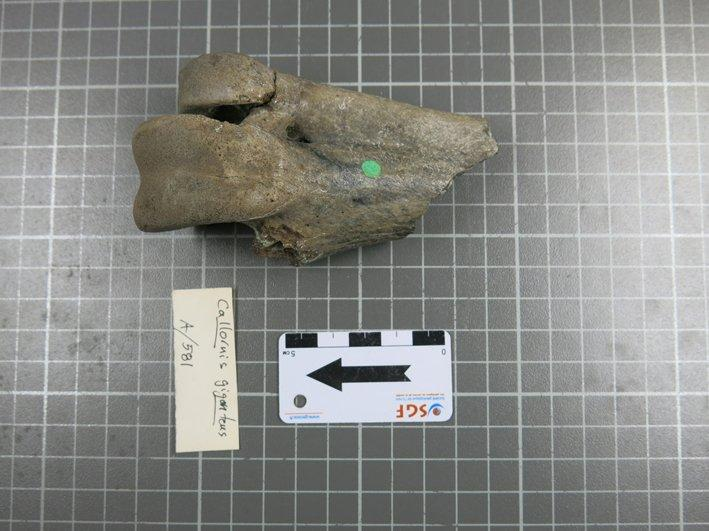
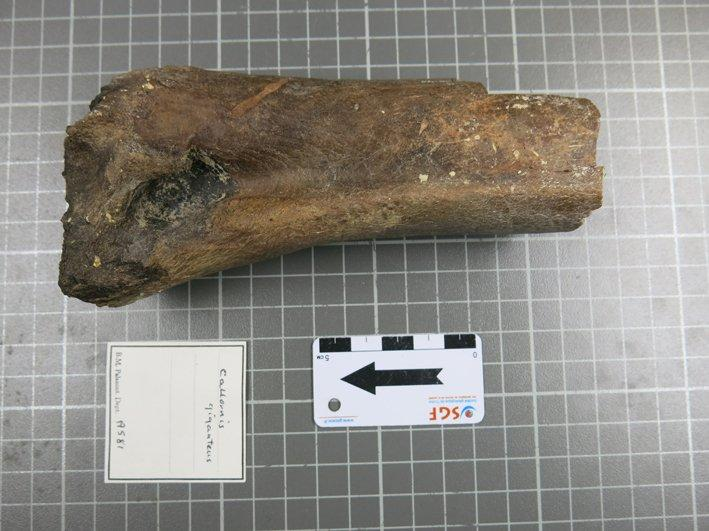
Fossils from the holotype specimens of Phororhacos sehuensis (top) and Callornis giganteus (bottom), junior synonyms of P. longissimus

==== Synonyms of P. longissimus ====
- Callornis giganteus was described by Ameghino (1895) on the basis of a fragment of the left tarsometatarsus (MLP 176) that had been found in the Santa Cruz Formation of Argentina. In 1901, Ameghino renamed Callornis to Eucallornis giganteus based on the false idea that the genus Callornis was preoccupied. Until a comprehensive 2016 study by Buffetaut, C. giganteus was thought to be a synonym of P. longissimus. The paper claimed that it was a chimera (a mix of fossils from multiple species) instead, with the tarsometatarsus belonging to P. longissimus while the tibiotarsus comes from a brontornithid.
- Darwinornis copei was described in 1891 by Moreno and Mercerat on the basis of the bottom end of a left tibia, a tarsometatarsus fragment, and unidentified fragments (MLP 20-171-173) that had been found in the Santa Cruz Formation of Argentina. The consensus is that it is a synonym of P. longissimus.
- Darwinornis socialis was described in 1891 by Moreno and Mercerat on the basis of a fragment of a left tarsometatarsus (MLP 20-176) that had been found in the Santa Cruz Formation. It is considered a synonym of P. longissimus.
- Darwinornis zittelli was described in 1891 by Moreno and Mercerat on the basis of right tibiotarsus and tarsometatarsus fragments (MLP 20-174-175) that were collected from the Santa Cruz Formation. It was considered a synonym of P. longissimus by Brodkorb in 1967, an assessment that other authors have followed.
- Liornis minor was described by Dolgopol de Sáez (1927) on the basis of the bottom end of a tibiotarsus that had been found in the Santa Cruz Formation of Argentina. Dolgopol de Sáez considered Liornis to be related to Brontornis, although Alvarenga and Höfling (2003) stated that the species is a synonym of P. longissimus. This conclusion has been supported by other studies.
- Mesembriornis quatrefragesi was described in 1891 by Moreno and Mercerat on the basis of a humerus (upper arm bone) fragment, the top end of the left ulna, the bottom end of the right tibia, the trochlea of the right tarsometatarsus, and an ungual phalanx (MLP 135-139) that had been found in the Santa Cruz Formation of Argentina. It was considered a synonym of P. longissimus by Brodkorb in 1967, an assessment that other authors have followed.
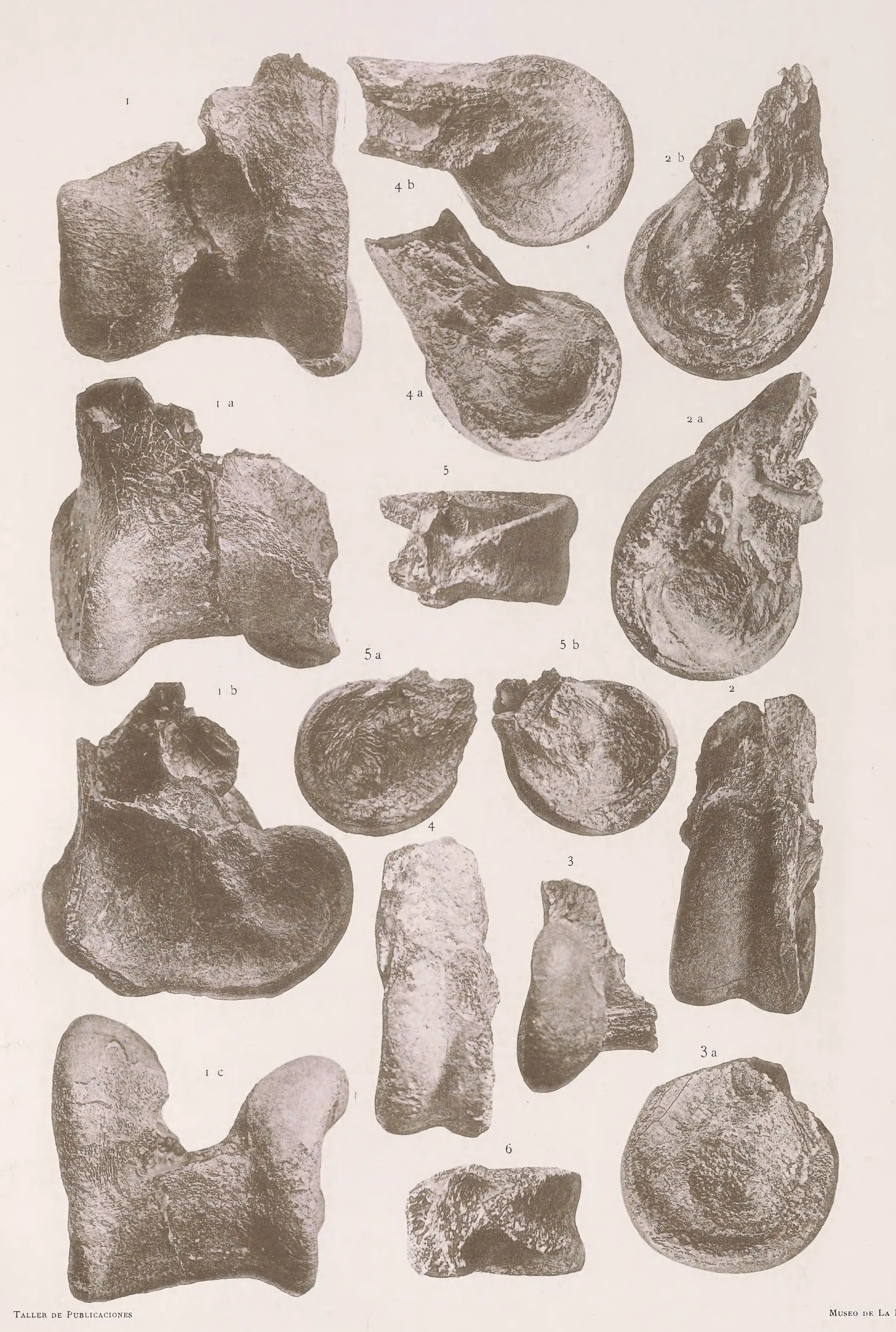
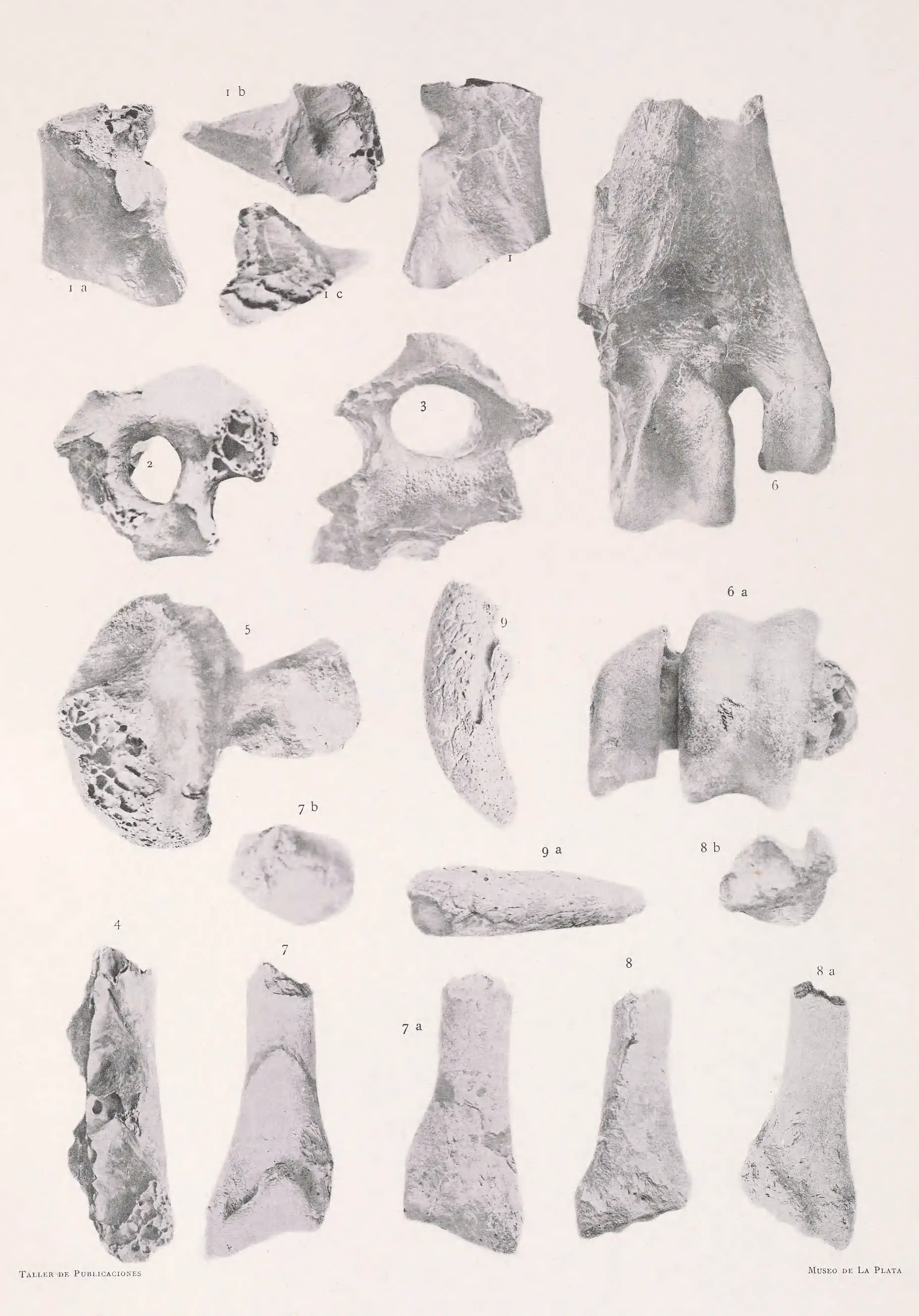
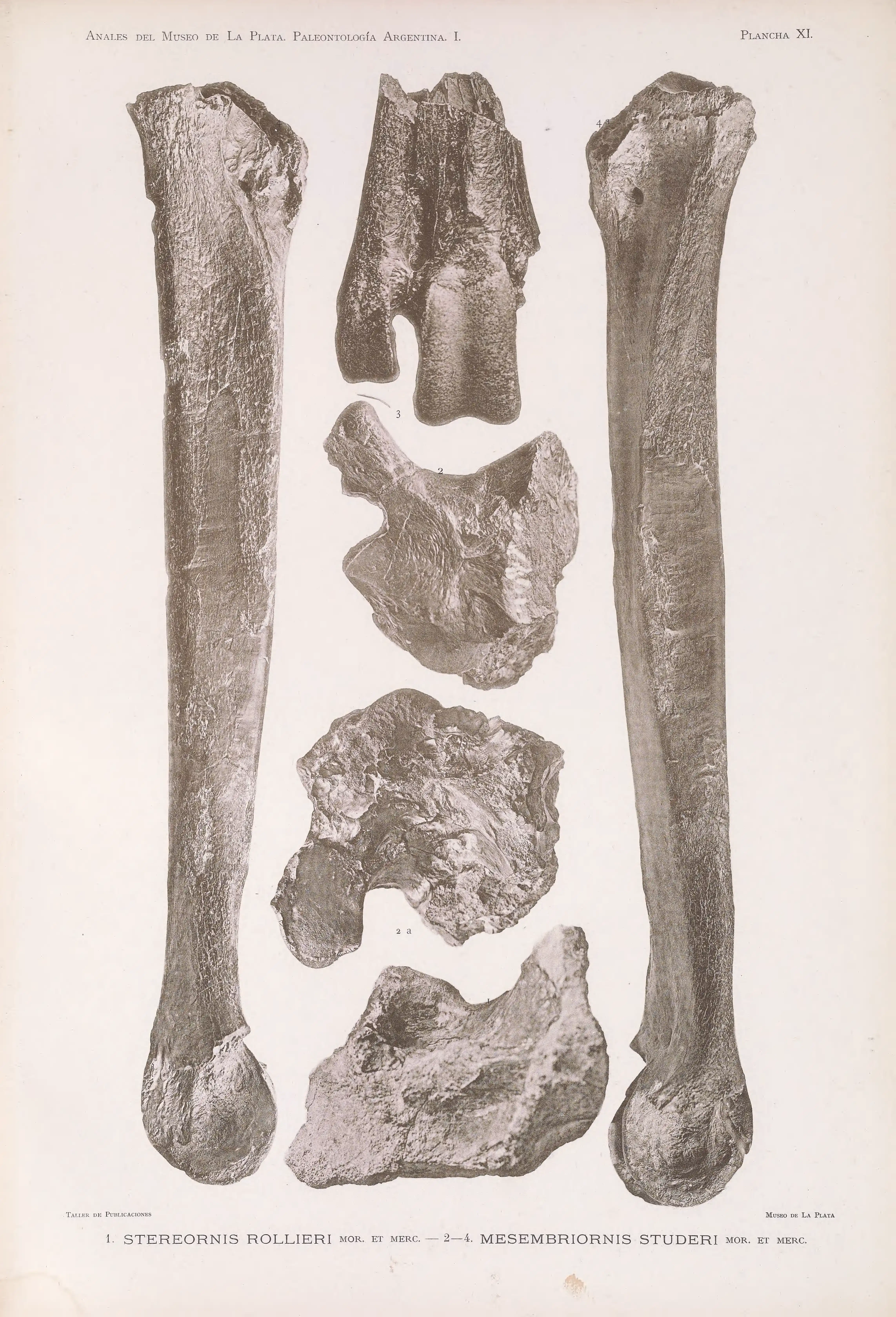
  Fossils of Darwinornis, Owenornis (top), Mesembriornis studeri, M. quatrefagesi, (left) and Stereornis (right), junior synonyms of P. longissimus, as figured in Moreno and Mercerat (1891)
  Mesembriornis studeri was described in 1891 by Moreno and Mercerat on the basis of a fragmentary skull and skeleton (MLP 122-134) that had been found in the Monte Leon Formation of Argentina. Later studies of its remains consider it a synonym of P. longissimus. Due to this, in 1914 Italian geologist Gaetano Rovereto erected the new genus name Hermosiornis for "M". milneedwardsi, while M. studeri, the type species of Mesembriornis, was as a synonym of P. longissimus. However, Alvarenga and Hölfing (2003) argued for the continued use of the name, which has seen some recognition. Other studies have pointed out this discrepancy and opted to use Hermosiornis instead.
- Owenornis affinis was described in 1891 by Moreno and Mercerat on the basis of a fragment of the right tarsometatarsus (MLP 177) that had been found in the Santa Cruz Formation of Argentina. It was considered a synonym of P. longissimus by Brodkorb in 1967, an assessment that other authors have followed.
- Owenornis lydekkeri was described in 1891 by Moreno and Mercerat on the basis of fragmentary vertebrae, a right tibia fragment, and fragments of both tarsometatarsi (MLP 178-182) that had been found in the Santa Cruz Formation of Argentina. Like O. affinis, it is a synonym of P. longissimus.
- Phororhacos platygnathus was described by Ameghino (1891) on the basis of a fragment of the left tarsometatarsus and an incomplete mandibular symphysis (MLP 176) that had been found in the Santa Cruz Formation of Argentina. Recent studies of its remains state it is a synonym of P. longissimus. In 1931, Uruguayan naturalist Lucas Kraglievich described a mandibular symphysis fragment he found as similar to P. platygntahus, but it is now assigned to the phorusrhacid Devincenzia pozzi.
- Phororhacos shenensis was described by Ameghino (1891) on the basis of a mandibular symphysis fragment, portions of the femur, and parts of the tarsometatarsus that had been discovered in the Santa Cruz Formation of Argentina. All recent studies agree that it is a synonym of P. longissimus.
- Phororhacos sehuenensis was described by Ameghino (1891) on the basis of a right mandible, incomplete vertebrae, a right tibia fragment, and fragments of both tarsometatarsi (MLP 178-182) that had been found in the Santa Cruz Formation of Argentina. It was considered a synonym of P. longissimus by Brodkorb in 1967, an assessment that other authors have followed.
- Stereornis gaudryi was described in 1891 by Moreno and Mercerat on the basis of the top section of a left tarsometatarsus (MLP 121) that had been found in the early Miocene-aged Monte Leon Formation of Argentina. The current consensus is that it is a synonym of P. longissimus.
- Stereornis rolleri was described in 1891 by Moreno and was described in 1891 by Moreno and Mercerat on the basis of the upper ends of a left tibia and a left tarsometatarsus (MLP 119- 120) that had been found in the Santa Cruz Formation of Argentina. It has been considered a synonym of P. longissimus by various authors.
- Titanornis mirabilis was described by was described in 1891 by Moreno and Mercerat (1893) on the basis of a large, associated skeleton including much of the rostrum, the left tarsometatarsus, and the distal end of a tibiotarsus (MLP 176) that had been found in the Santa Cruz Formation of Argentina. It was considered a synonym of P. longissimus by Brodkorb in 1967, an assessment that most authors agree with. However, Agnolín (2009) argued that Titanornis would be over a third larger than the typical P. longissimus and has a rostrum similar to that of the other phorusrhacid Kelenken. Furthermore, he stated that it cannot be a synonym of P. longissimus on account of its elongated distal (away from body) tarsometatarsus, again reminiscent of Kelenken. As a result, Agnolín regarded it as a nomen dubium, partly due to the loss of its holotype.
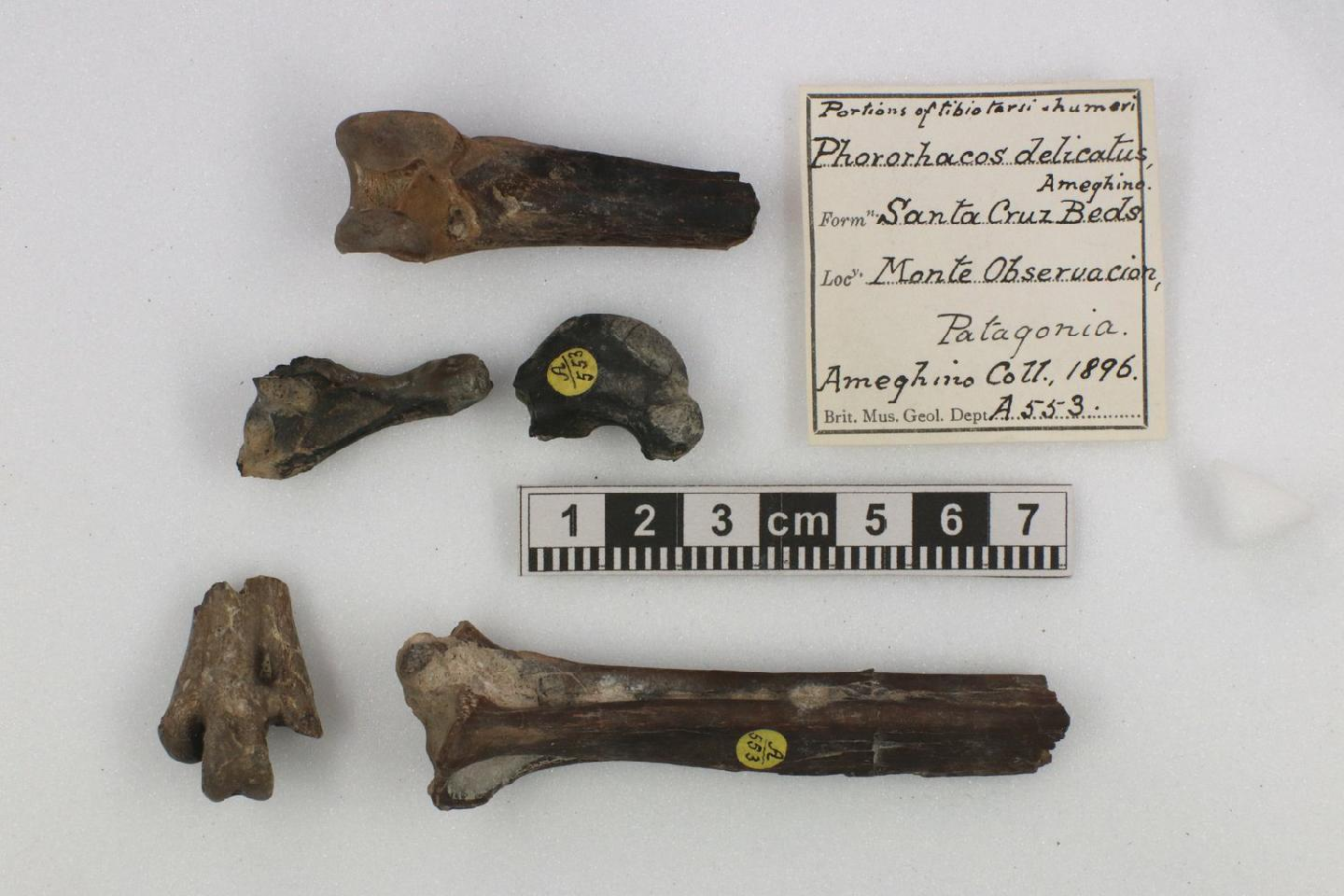
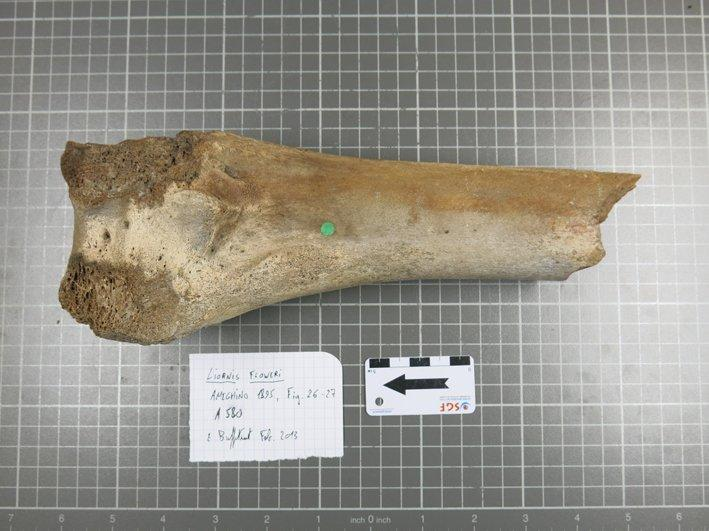
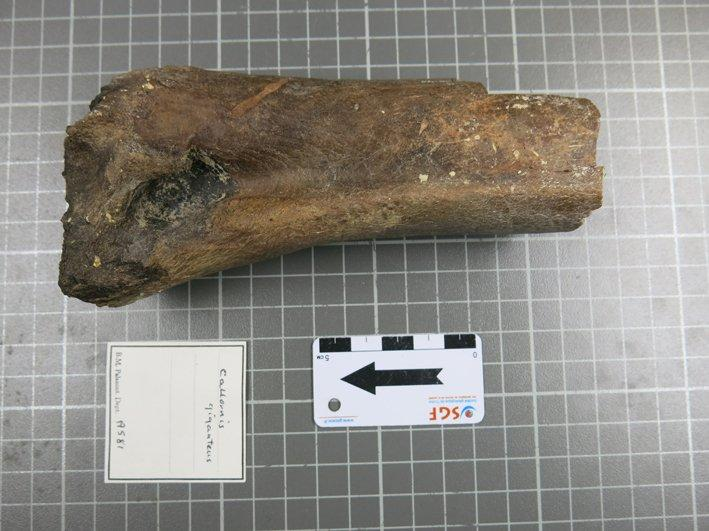
  Fossils from the holotype specimens of Phororhacos sehuensis (top) and Callornis giganteus (bottom), junior synonyms of P. longissimus

==== Reclassified species ====
- Liornis floweri was described by Ameghino in an 1895 article on the basis of a distal tibiotarsus, distal tarsometatarsus, and two pedal phalanges of a juvenile individual. This material was unearthed on an expedition to a deposit of the Santa Cruz Formation in Santa Cruz Province, Argentina. In 1927, Dolgopol de Sáez argued that Liornis is related to Brontornis, whereas in their 2003 work on Phorusrhacidae, Alvarenga and Höfling argued that it is a synonym of P. longissimus. In 2016, Buffetaut stated that L. floweri is a synonym of Brontornis burmeisteri.
- Phororhacos affinis was described by Ameghino in an 1899 paper on the basis of an isolated tarsometatarsus (MACN-A-52-184) that was collected from an outcrop of the Oligocene-aged Guaranitica Formation in Chubut Province, Argentina. It is now considered a species of Psilopterus.
- Phororhacos daeutieri was named in 1931 by Kraglievich on the basis of an incomplete femur that was recovered from rock layers dating to the Miocene from the Ituzaingó Formation, in Entre Ríos Province, Argentina. In their 1960 description of the phorusrhacid Andalgalornis, American paleontologist Bryan Patterson and Kraglievich provisionally moved P. daeutieri to Andalgalornis, despite the former coming from a site 900 kilometers (560 mi) away. Nonetheless, in 2003 Alvarenga and Höfling stated that A. daeutieri is a synonym of A. steulleti. This has seen widespread usage, however studies by Federico Agnolín have stated that A. ferox is valid whereas A. daeutieri is a nomen dubium.
- Phororhacos delicatus was described by Ameghino in 1891 on the basis of a dorsal vertebra and a few fragmentary limb elements that were recovered from several localities in the Santa Cruz Formation in Santa Cruz, Argentina. It was considered a synonym of Psilopterus communis by Brodkorb in 1967 and Alvarenga and Höfling in 2003, whereas in 2009 Agnolin considered it a synonym of Psilopterus bachmanni.
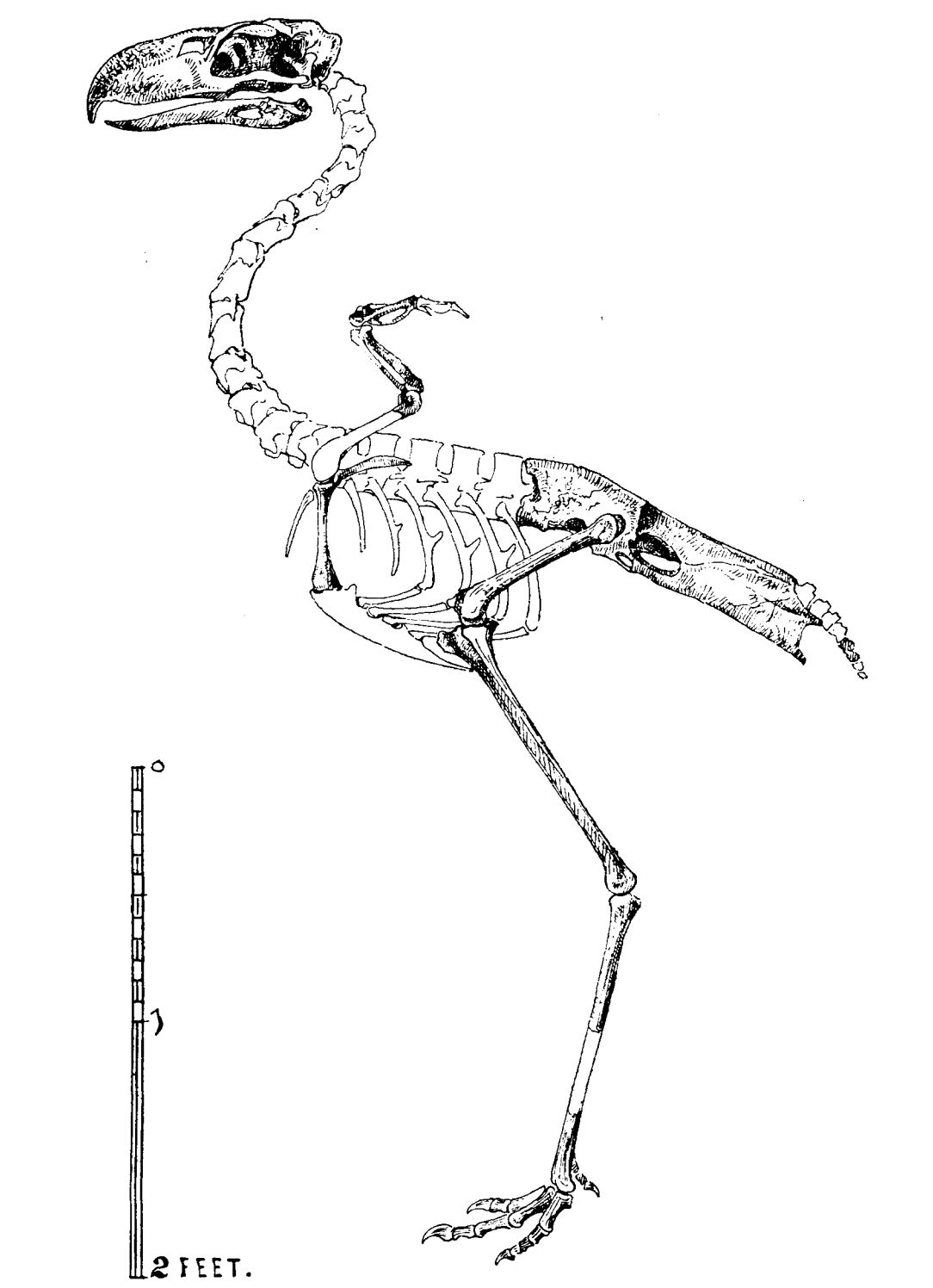
  A skeleton illustrated by Andrews (1899) and formerly assigned to Phorusrhacos (now Patagornis) inflatus
- Phororhacos inflatus was initially described by Ameghino (1891) as Tolmodus inflatus on the basis of a premaxilla fragment found in the Santa Cruz Formation of Argentina. Ameghino (1895) and Andrews (1899) moved it to Phororhacos and assigned several well-preserved specimens, including a complete skull, to the species. Due to this, P. inflatus fossils formed the basis of many Phorusrhacos depictions, though it has since been considered a synonym of Patagornis marshi.
- Phororhacos modicus was described by Ameghino (1895) on the basis of a humerus fragment, the upper end of the left ulna, the distal end of the right tibia, the trochlea (a groove for articulation with the tibiotarsus) of the right tarsometatarsus, and an ungual phalanx (MLP 135-139) that had been found in the Santa Cruz Formation of Argentina. It was considered a synonym of Palaeociconia cristata, a synonym of Patagornis marshi, by Brodkorb in 1967, however it is a synonym of Psilopterus lemoinei or Psilopterus australis instead.
- Phororhacos pozzi was named by Kraglievich (1931) on the basis of a partial tarsometatarsus and ungual phalanx (MACN-6554 and 6681) that had been found in Pliocene-aged strata in the El Brete site in Córdoba, Argentina. The Uruguayan phorusrhacid Devincenzia gallinali was later considered a synonym of P. pozzi, creating the binomial Devincenzia pozzi. However, other studies like Agnolín (2021) have argued that the stratigraphic and geographic separation of D. gallinali and D. pozzi indicate that the latter actually belongs to the genus Onactornis.
- Phororhacos longissimus mendocinus was named by Kraglievich (1931) on the basis of a femur fragment that had been found in Pliocene-aged rock layers of the Huayquerías Formation in the San Carlos Department of Mendoza, Argentina. In 1960, Patterson and Kraglievich moved it to the genus Onactornis, whereas Alvarenga and Höfling (2003) synonymized it with D. pozzi. However, Agnolín (2006) stated it was a nomen dubium instead and indeterminate beyond Phorusrhacinae.
- Phororhacos steulleti was named by Kraglievich (1931) on the basis of an isolated pedal phalanx (toe bone) that was recovered from rock layers dating to the Miocene belonging to the Ituzaingó Formation, in the province of Entre Ríos, Argentina. In their description of Andalgalornis, Patterson and Kraglievich (1960) provisionally moved P. steulleti to Andalgalornis, despite deriving from a potentially different stratigraphic layer. Nonetheless, Alvarenga and Höfling (2003) stated that A. ferox is a synonym of A. steulleti, creating the binomial Andalgalornis steulleti. This has seen widespread usage however, studies like Agnolín (2013) have stated that A. ferox is valid, whereas A. steulleti is a nomen dubium.

== Taxonomy ==
During the early Cenozoic, after the extinction of the non-bird dinosaurs, mammals underwent an evolutionary diversification, and some bird groups around the world developed a tendency towards gigantism; this included the Gastornithidae, the Dromornithidae, the Palaeognathae and the Phorusrhacidae. Phorusrhacids are an extinct group within Cariamiformes, the only living members of which are the two species of seriemas in the family Cariamidae. While they are the most speciose group within Cariamiformes, the interrelationships between phorusrhacids are unclear due to the incompleteness of their remains.

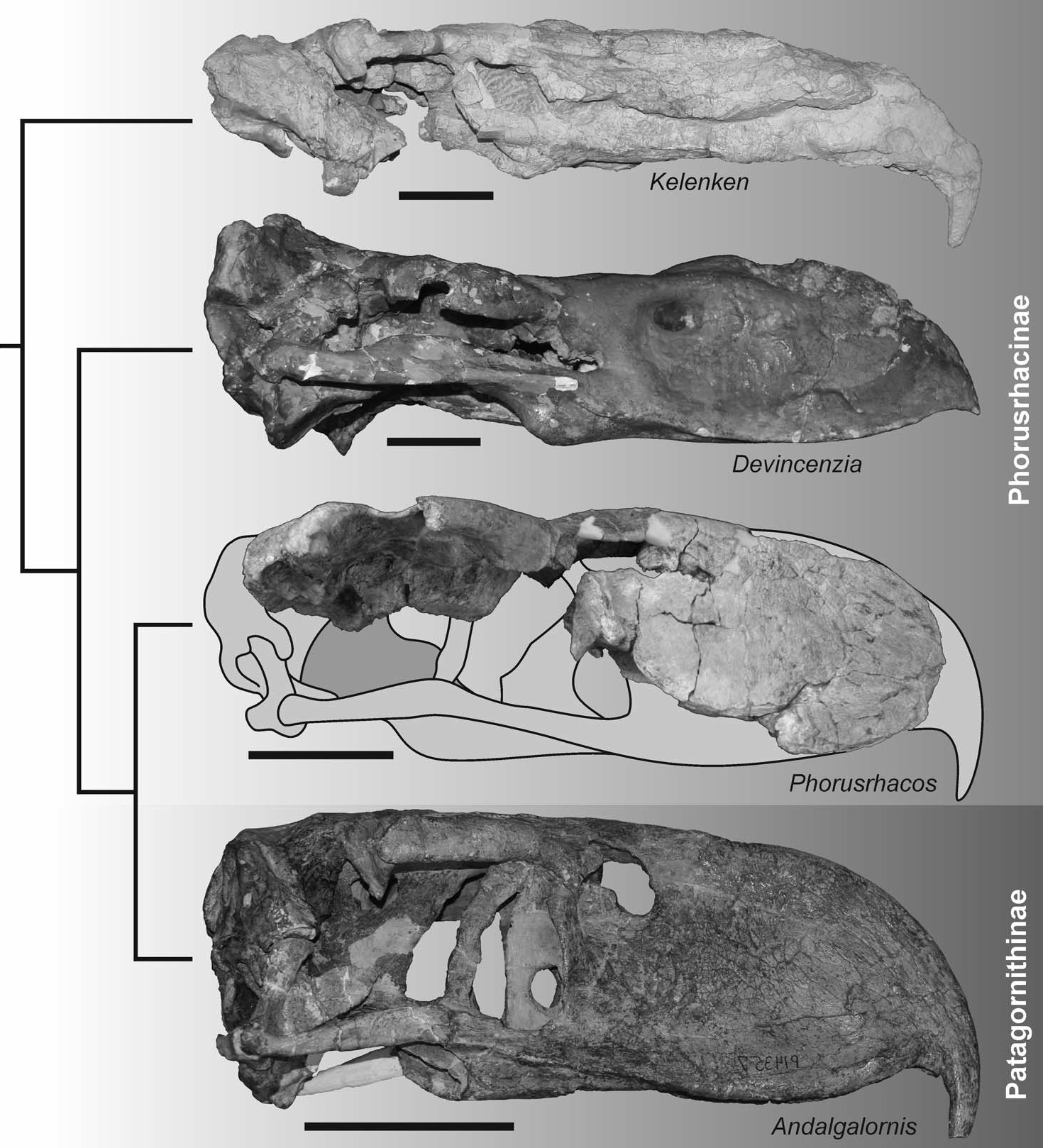
Skulls of Phorusrhacinae and Andalgalornis (a possible phorusrhacine)

Phorusrhacos is the type genus of the superfamily Phorusrhacoidea, family Phorusrhacidae and subfamily Phorusrhacinae. Phorusrhacidae is an extinct group of flightless, carnivorous birds that occupied one of the dominant, large land-predator niches in South America from the lower Eocene to the Pleistocene. They dispersed into North America during the Great American Biotic Interchange (~3 Ma). Some remains from Africa and Europe and the Paleocene of Brazil have been assigned to this clade or identified as phylogenetically related to the extant South American seriemas, but these assignments remain controversial. Phorusrhacos was the first phorusrhacid to be discovered or named. Phorusrhacidae was a clade created by Ameghino (1889) as "Phororhacosidae", which he believed was related to the anteater Myrmecophaga. Moreno (1888) was the first to recognize the avian affinities of the phorusrhacids, referring to them as "large birds", later calling the group Stereornithes. They also stated that Stereornithes was a transitional stage between the Anatidae and the Vulturidae. The name "Stereornithes" is now considered synonymous with Phorusrhacidae. In Andrews (1899), he assigned Stereornithes to Cariamae, the clade including the closest living relatives of the phorusrhacids, cariamas.

The interrelationships of Phorusrhacidae are unclear, partly due to their sparse fossil record. It was not until Brodkorb (1967) that Phororhacidae was corrected to Phorusrhacidae in literature. Furthermore, Brodkorb (1967) constricted Phorusrhacidae to the subfamilies Brontornithinae, Paleociconiinae, and Phorusrhacinae. In 2003, Brazilian paleontologists Herculano Alvarenga and Elizabeth Höfling published a revision of the family in which they recognized and defined six subfamilies, Brontornithinae, Mesembriornithinae, Patagornithinae, Phorusrhacinae, Physornithinae, and Psilopterinae. In a separate study, Alvarenga and colleagues (2011) performed a phylogenetic analysis (a study of the evolutionary relationships between organisms), which recovered Patagornithinae, Phorusrhacinae, and Physornithinae in a polytomy (an unnatural grouping) (topology 1). A later phylogenetic analysis by Degrange and colleagues (2015) found Phorusrhacidae to include Mesembrironithinae and Psilopterinae as distinct, while Patagornithinae, Phorusrhacinae, and Physornithinae is in polytomy (topology 2). Here, Phorusrhacos was united with genera previously included in Patagornithinae and Physornithinae, while Devincenzia and Kelenken lay outside of the clade.

Topology 1: Alvarenga et al. (2011) results

- Phorusrhacidae
  - Mesembriornithinae
  - - Psilopterinae
    - - Patagornis
      - Andrewsornis
      - Andalgalornis
      - Phorusrhacos
      - Titanis
      - - Devincenzia
        - Kelenken
      - Brontornis
      - Physornis
      - Paraphysornis

Topology 2: Degrange et al. (2015) results

- Phorusrhacidae
  - - Mesembriornithinae
    - Psilopterinae
  - - Kelenken guillermoi
    - - Devincenzia pozzi
      - - Titanis walleri
        - - - Phorusrhacos longissimus
            - Andalgalornis steulleti
            - Andrewsornis abbotti
            - Patagornis marshi
            - Physornis fortis
          - Paraphysornis brasiliensis

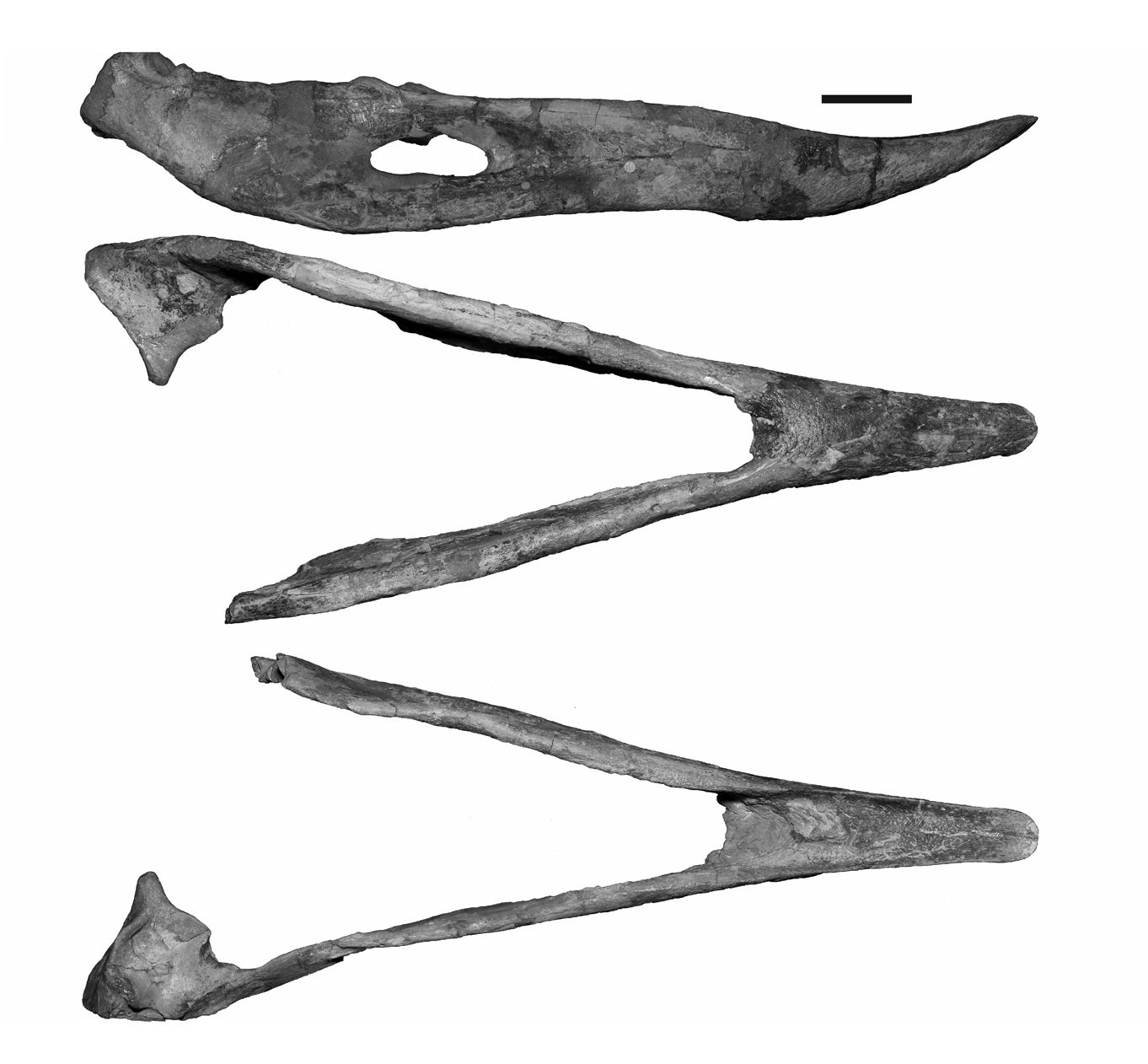
Mandible (lower jaw) of NHMUK-A529 in multiple perspectives

The subfamily Phorusrhacinae includes Phorusrhacos itself in addition to genera like Devincenzia, Kelenken, and Titanis. The name "Phorusrhacinae" was first used by Kraglievich (1931) and defined as including Phorusrhacos longissimus, Devincenzia pozzi, their descendents, and their most recent common ancestor. Kraglievich characterized phorusrhacines by their large size, robust limbs, and cranial features observed in Devincenzia. Patterson and Kraglievich (1960) went on to include Phorusrhacos and Devincenzia in the clade, with Kelenken and Titanis added in later works. Phorusrhacos is the oldest named, both historically and geologically, and sometimes the basalmost member of Phorusrhacinae, while taxa like Devincenzia and Kelenken are typically recovered as sister taxa. Alvarenga and Höfling (2003) stated Phorusrhacinae subsisted of Phorusrhacos, Devincenzia, Kelenken, and Titanis. They defined (the traits taxa have to be considered members) Phorusrhacinae by the presence of an overall size and gigantic build, more lithe traits than Brontornithinae (a clade which may not be phorusrhacid), and a relatively elongated and slender tarsometatarsus, which is over 60% of the length of the tibiotarsus. Furthermore, a relatively long, narrow, and relatively dorsoventrally (top-bottom) short mandibular symphysis (the area where both mandibulae (lower jaws) meet) which measures over twice as long as the width of the base was considered a defining characteristic too.

In contrast, Agnolín (2009) expanded Phorusrhacinae to include Phorusrhacos, Andalgalornis, Devincenzia, Kelenken, Titanis, and the tribe Physornithini, which is composed of Physornis and Paraphysornis. He stated the group was distinguished from other phorusrhacids by the presence of a tall, robust postorbital process (an extension on the quadrate that interlocked with the postorbital bone) and a subrectangular antorbital fenestra (a gap in the skull in front of the orbit). Agnolín's stance was backed by a phylogenetic analysis, which found Andalgalornis and Phorusrhacos to be sister taxa. Similar to the results of Agnolín (2009), American paleontologists Thomas LaBarge and Chris Organ and British paleontologist Jacob Gardner (2024) recovered a broken up Phorusrhacinae, with only Titanis and Phorusrhacos being phorusrhacines. Although their analysis found Kelenken and Devincenzia as closer to Physornithi, La Barge, Organ, and Gardner (2024) stated that this may be a result of parallel evolution of robust traits, as Phorusrhacos was relatively gracile and cursorial. This led them to continue to include Devincenzia and Kelenken in the subfamily despite the results. The cladogram below shows the position of Phorusrhacos according to an analysis by Agnolín and colleagues (2025):

- Phorusrhacidae
  - - Llallawavis
    - Procariama
    - - Psilopterus
      - - - Hermosiornis
        - - Patagornis
          - Andalgalornis
          - Andrewsornis
          - Patagorhacos
          - Phorusrhacinae
            - Phorusrhacos
            - - Physornithini
                - Physornis
                - Paraphysornis
              - - Onactornis
                - Kelenken

== Description ==
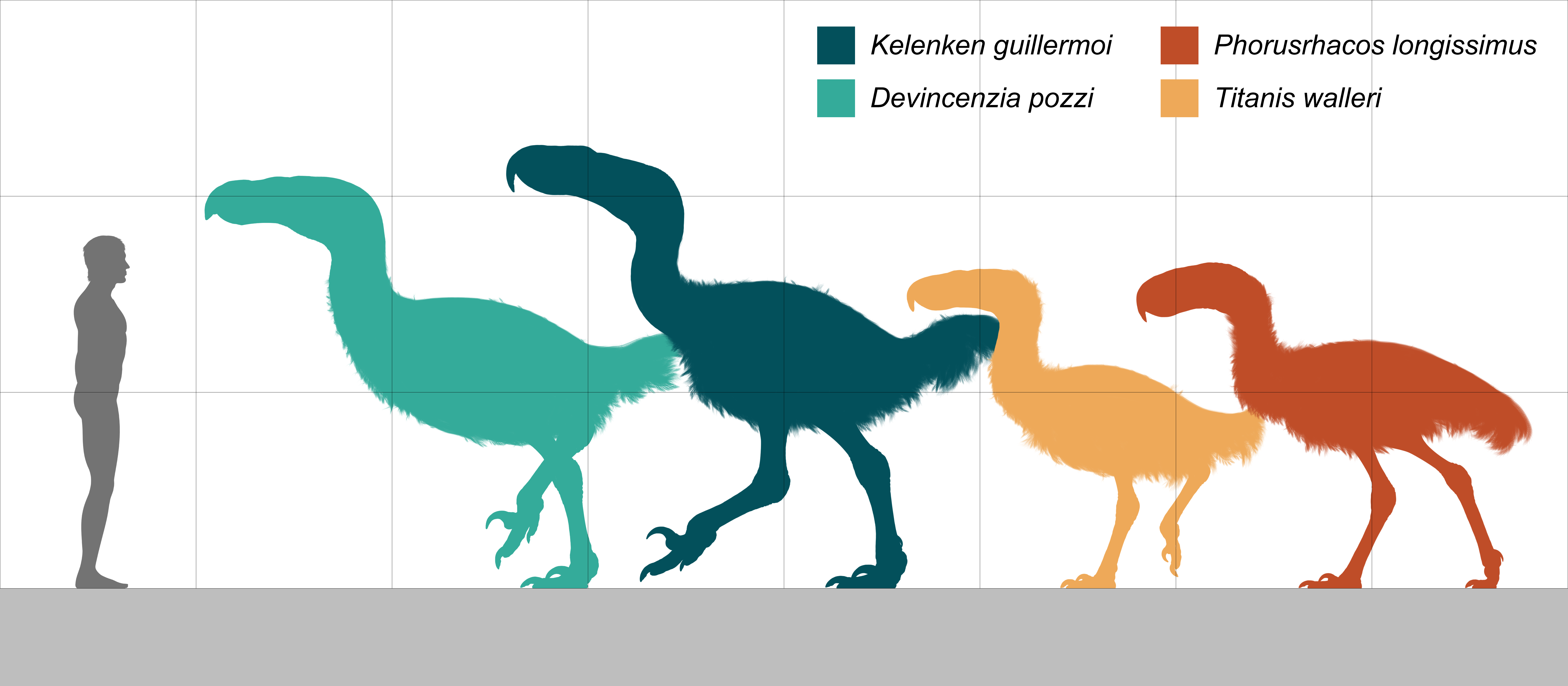
Size of Phorusrhacos (dark orange, furthest to the right), compared to a human and other phorusrhacids (Kelenken, Titanis, Devincenzia)

Phorusrhacids were large, flightless birds with long hind limbs, narrow pelvises, proportionally small wings, and huge skulls, with a tall, long, sideways compressed hooked beak. Evidence of elongated quill-feathers is known from Patagornis and Llallawavis, with large tubercles called quill knobs present on their ulnae. These quill knobs would have supported long flight feathers. Phorusrhacos was a large but lightly built phorusrhacid. According to Alvarenga and Höfling (2003), Phorusrhacos was equivalent in size to Titanis, which has been placed at 1.4–1.9 meters (4.6–6.2 ft) in height. Meanwhile, American paleontologist Darin A. Croft gave a higher estimate of 2.4 meters (7.9 ft) tall and 130 kilograms (290 lb) in weight, around the size of a male ostrich (Struthio camelus). In 2012, Degrange and colleagues estimated Phorusrhacos to have weighed 93 kilograms (205 lb) based on allometric calculations.

Composite skull reconstruction including the holotype, MPEF-PV 11356, and NHMUK A529 (missing parts in grey)

=== Skull ===
Until the description of MPEF-PV 11356, the skull of Phorusrhacos was largely known from Carlos Ameghino's sketch of the NHMUK A529. This skull differs from MPEF-PV 11356 in several areas, and it likely references a skull of Patagornis for the sketch. Otherwise, Carlos' depictions of the skulls of large phorusrhacines like Phorusrhacos were based on Patagornis, which is known from several, well-preserved skulls, until the discovery of Kelenken. NHMUK A529 had an estimated length of 65 centimeters (26 in), however the better preserved MPEF-PV 11356 has an estimated skull length of only 52 centimeters (20 in).

MPEF-PV 11356 consists of much of the rostrum and part of the skull roof and orbit (eye cavity). The skull also preserves the outline of the top-front part of the brain cavity. This skull has a proportionally narrow and deep rostrum that is 6 centimeters (2.4 in) wide and would have been 17.3 centimeters (6.8 in) deep when complete. It is flat and wide, at 24 centimeters (9.4 in) wide, in side view and triangular in top view. This makes the skull proportionally shorter than that of Kelenken, and more similar to those of patagornithines like Patagornis and Andalgalornis. Foramina (small pits in bone) and grooves cover the side faces of the rostrum. These foramina and grooves functioned as ophthalmic and nasopalatine nerve exits and are observed in many phorusrhacids. Unlike the straight premaxillary beak tips of Kelenken and psilopterines, Phorusrhacos' is slightly upturned on its ventral (bottom) margin close to the beak tip, as in patagornithines and some phorusrhacines.

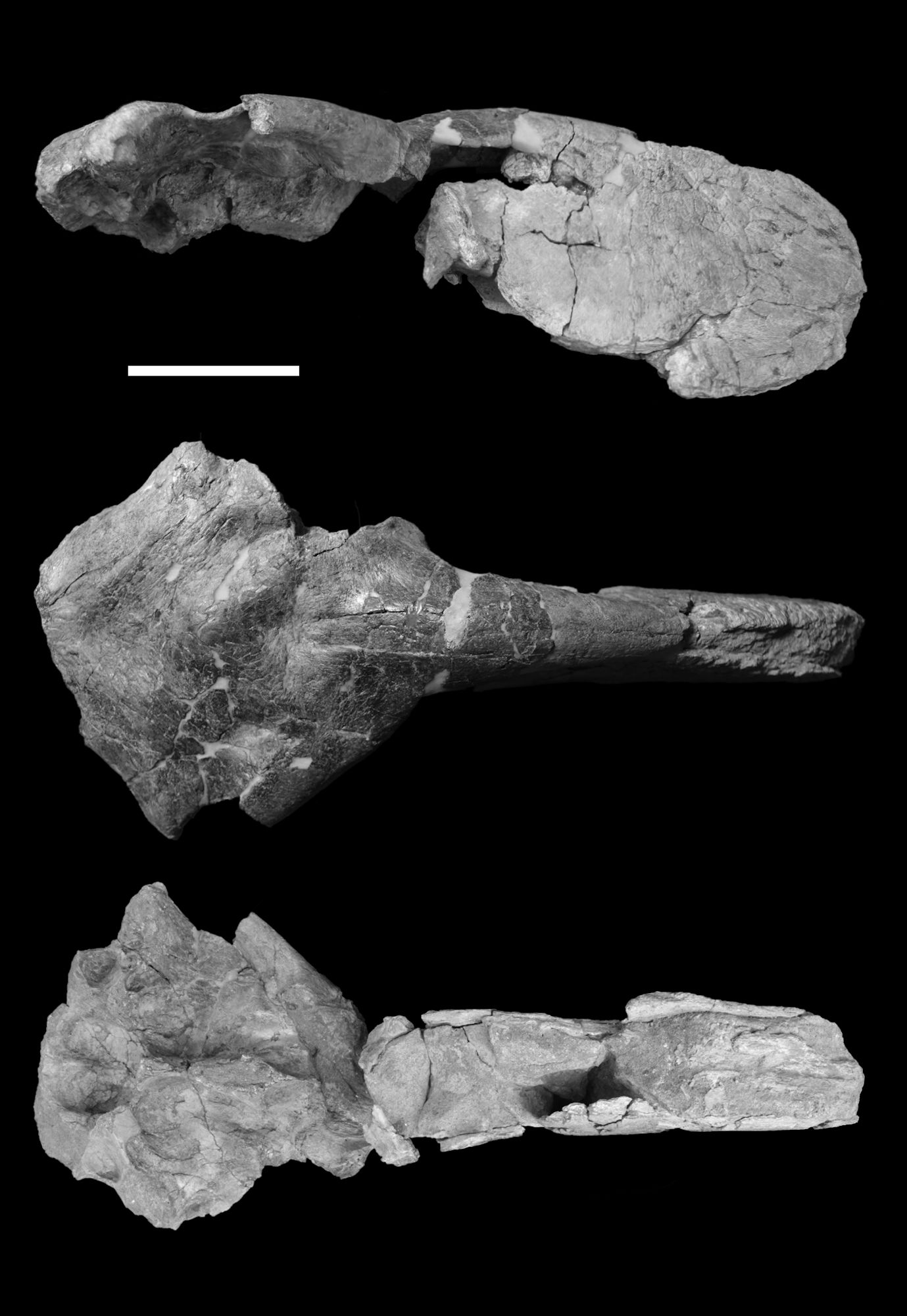
The skull of MPEF-PV 11356 in right lateral (side), dorsal (top) and ventral (bottom) views

The nares (nasal openings) are holorhinous (rounded or oval and do not have a deep split or cleft), as in Kelenken. These nares are overall elongated from front to back, like in Kelenken, and curved at the top, while Kelenken's is straight. The sides of the beak tip have large accessory fossae (depressions in bone), like in many phorusrhacids. Above the orbit is the supraorbital, which is large and separated from the dorsal rim, like in Devincenzia. This bone runs parallel to the roof of the cranium above the orbit in MPEF-PV 11356, however it is slightly deflected in the skull depicted by Ameghino in 1895. Unique to Phorusrhacos, the postorbital process is turned slightly downward, unlike the steeply deflected processes of Devincenzia's and Kelenken's skulls. Inside the braincase are possibly impressions of the brain's vena, which are divided by a low ridge. Adjacent to this ridge is an accessory fossa (a depression in bone) not found in psilopterines, mesembriornithines, or other phorusrhacines, but is preserved in Patagornis. However, this fossa is shallower in Patagornis than it is in Phorusrhacos.

Several mandibulae, including the holotype, are known from P. longissimus. They vary in size and shape, with the longest measured (NHMUK A529) being 179 centimeters (70 in) long, 62 centimeters (24 in) tall, and 67 centimeters (26 in) wide whereas MLP 20-118 is only 160 centimeters (63 in) long, 53 centimeters (21 in) tall, and 67 centimeters (26 in) wide. Length/width measurements vary within P. longissimus specimens from 2.11 to 2.67, indicating that most specimens are shorter proportionately than phorusrhacids like Llallawavis and Patagornis. The symphysis (area where two halves of the lower jaws meet) of MPEF-PV 11356 is robust and bears nerve openings for the rhamphotheca at its front tip. In contrast, NHMUK A529's symphysis is relatively thin, measuring only 1 millimeter (0.039 in) thick. In contrast to those of physornithines, phorusrhacines have mandibular symphyses that are over twice as long as wide. The mandibular fenestrae (openings in the lower jaw) of Phorusrhacos vary between individuals, with some like that of NMHUK A529 being a lot longer anteroposteriorly (front-back) than that of MPM-PV4241.

=== Postcrania ===
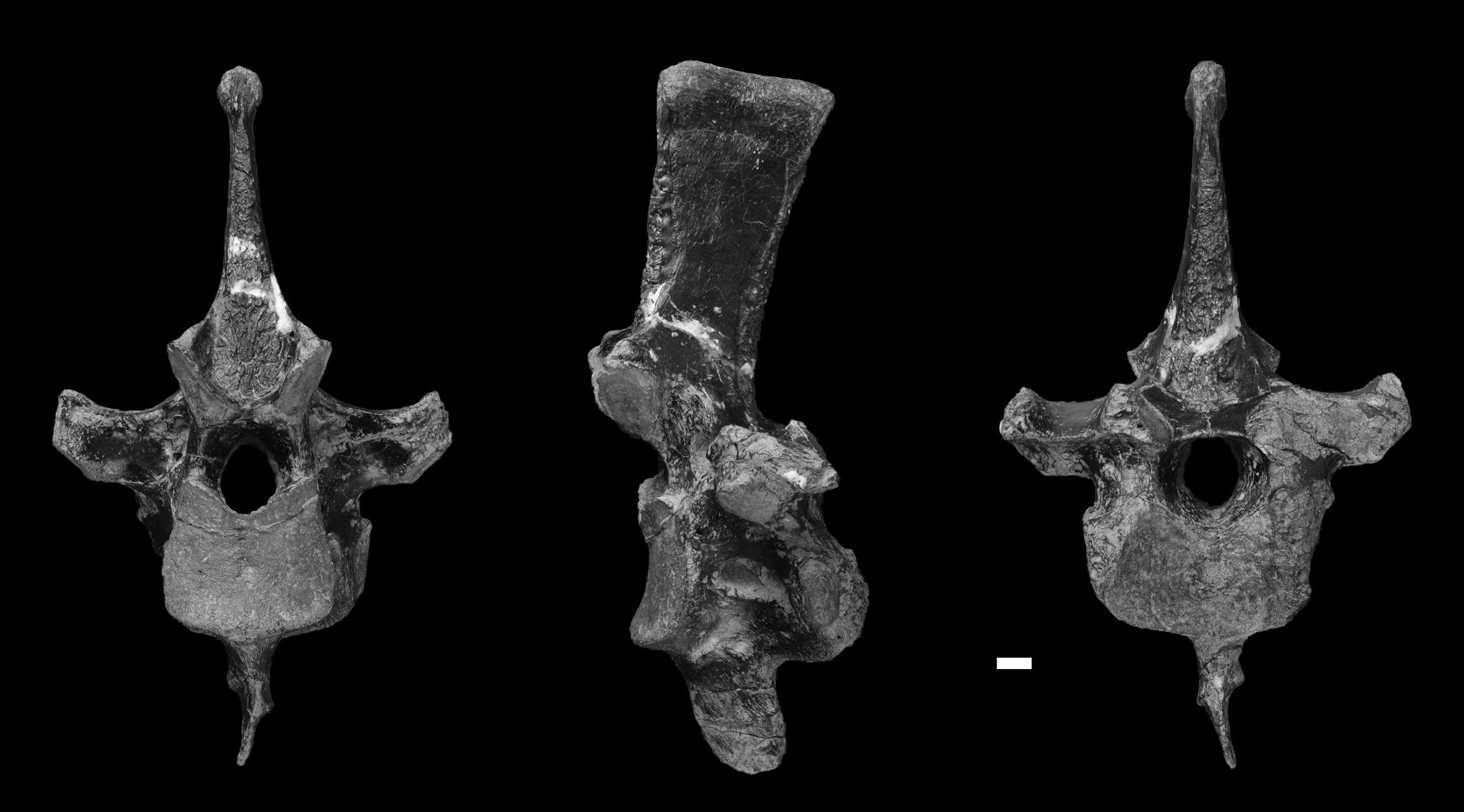
A dorsal vertebra (MPEF-PV 11355) possibly belonging to Phorusrhacos

Phorusrhacos is distinguished by other phorusrhacids by several postcranial features, including a tarsometatarsus that measures around 70% the length of the tibiotarsus and a middle trochlea which is not as expanded sidewards as seen in Titanis. Overall, Phorusrhacos is smaller and more lithe than its relatives like Devincenzia and Kelenken. The shaft of the tarsometatarsus is somewhat slender, with an almost rectangular mid-section, similar to Kelenken. The tibiotarsus has a deep, narrow intercondylar groove (a notch that articulates with the condyles of the tarsometatarsus). Overall, it is comparable to that of Patagornis yet differs in that it is flatter from top to bottom. Ameghino (1895) stated that the tarsometatarsus of P. longissimus is overall extremely similar to that of Patagornis except for its size. However, the distal end of P. longissimus' is proportionally wider and flatter with a lower posterior fossa (the area where the largest pedal phalange articulates with the tarsometatarsus) than in Patagornis. Phorusrhacos is one of few phorusrhacines known from pes material, which was briefly described by Ameghino (1895). The pedal ungual on the third digit is highly arched, sharp, and has an extensive basilar tubercule (a rounded bony growth for articulation with the phalanges) on its back side. Its entire third digit measures over 25 centimeters (9.8 in) long.

Ameghino (1895) briefly described the cervical vertebrae (neck bones) of Phorusrhacos, stating "sont aussi grosses que celles d'un cheval" ("are as big as those of a horse"). One of the first cervicals measures 10 centimeters (3.9 in) long, with a peak transverse diameter of 13 centimeters (5.1 in). A dorsal vertebra he assigned to P. sehuensis, a synonym of P. longissimus, was described as well. Its body is short, thick, very wide anteriorly, and truncated posteriorly. Its centrum (body of the vertebra) is 6 centimeters (2.4 in) in length with a V-shaped notch on its hind face. Overall, it has concave side surfaces as in other phorusrhacids and an elliptical articular region (area where two bones interlock) for the ribs.

MPEF-PV 11355, a 2nd or 3rd dorsal vertebrae potentially belonging to Phorusrhacos, was described in detail by Degrange and colleagues (2019). The vertebra is flattened side to side, giving it a relatively tall and narrow shape when compared to those of Mesembriornis. Overall, the neural spine (a growth from the top of the vertebra) is relatively longer than that of Mesembriornis and bears extreme muscle scars on its front and back surfaces, as in Titanis and Andalgalornis. When viewed from the front, the forward articular surface of the vertebra is wide and saddle-shaped. Its foramen vertebrale (an opening where the spinal cord travels through) is oval shaped and lies under a tall neural spine, giving the bone a total height of 17.4 centimeters (6.9 in). This indicates that it is the second largest phorusrhacid vertebra known, second only to an undescribed dorsal vertebra of Titanis. On the ventral side of the vertebra is a long keel, the processus ventralis corpus, which runs almost the whole length of the centrum and bears a rounded distal end. Due to the lack of postcranial material from derived phorusrhacids, few comparisons could be made with MPEF-PV 11355.

== Paleobiology ==
=== Feeding and diet ===
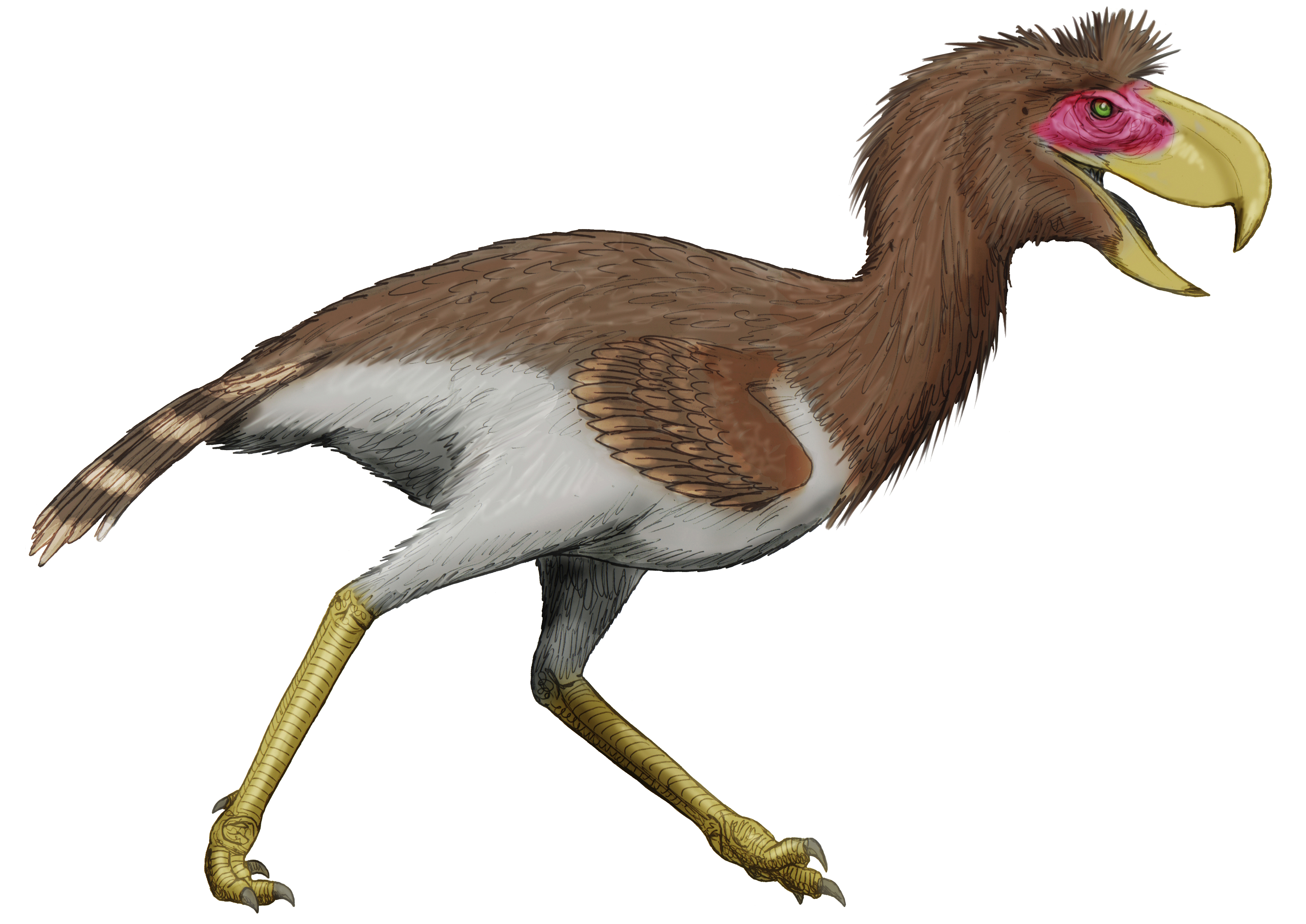
Hypothetical life restoration

Phorusrhacids are thought to have been ground predators or scavengers, and have often been considered apex predators that dominated Cenozoic South America in the absence of placental mammalian predators, though they did co-exist with some large, carnivorous borhyaenid mammals. Earlier hypotheses of phorusrhacid feeding ecology were mainly inferred from them having large skulls with hooked beaks rather than through detailed hypotheses and biomechanical studies, and such studies of their running and predatory adaptations were only conducted from the beginning of the 21st century. In general, phorusrhacids are separated into two primary ecological stances. Smaller, lithe genera like Psilopterus and Procariama are thought to have filled a sereima-like niche, feeding on smaller prey and potentially bearing limited flight abilities. Meanwhile, Phorusrhacos and other gigantic genera are presumed to have been macropredators and apex predators. Based on its cursorial proportions, Phorusrhacos was a pursuit predator that utilized speed to capture and dispatch prey. In contrast, its relatives like Kelenken and Devincenzia were likely graviportal ambush hunters instead, relying on stealth to hunt prey.

Brazilian researchers Herculano Alvarenga and Elizabeth Höfling made some general remarks about phorusrhacid habits in a 2003 article. They were flightless, as evidenced by the proportional size of their wings and body mass, and wing-size was more reduced in larger members of the group. These researchers pointed out that the narrowing of the pelvis, upper maxilla and thorax could have been adaptations to enable the birds to search for and take smaller animals in tall plant growth or broken terrain. The large expansions above the eyes formed by the lacrimal bones (similar to what is seen in modern hawks) would have protected the eyes against the sun, and enabled keen eyesight, which indicates they hunted by sight in open, sunlit areas, and not shaded forests.

==== Leg function ====
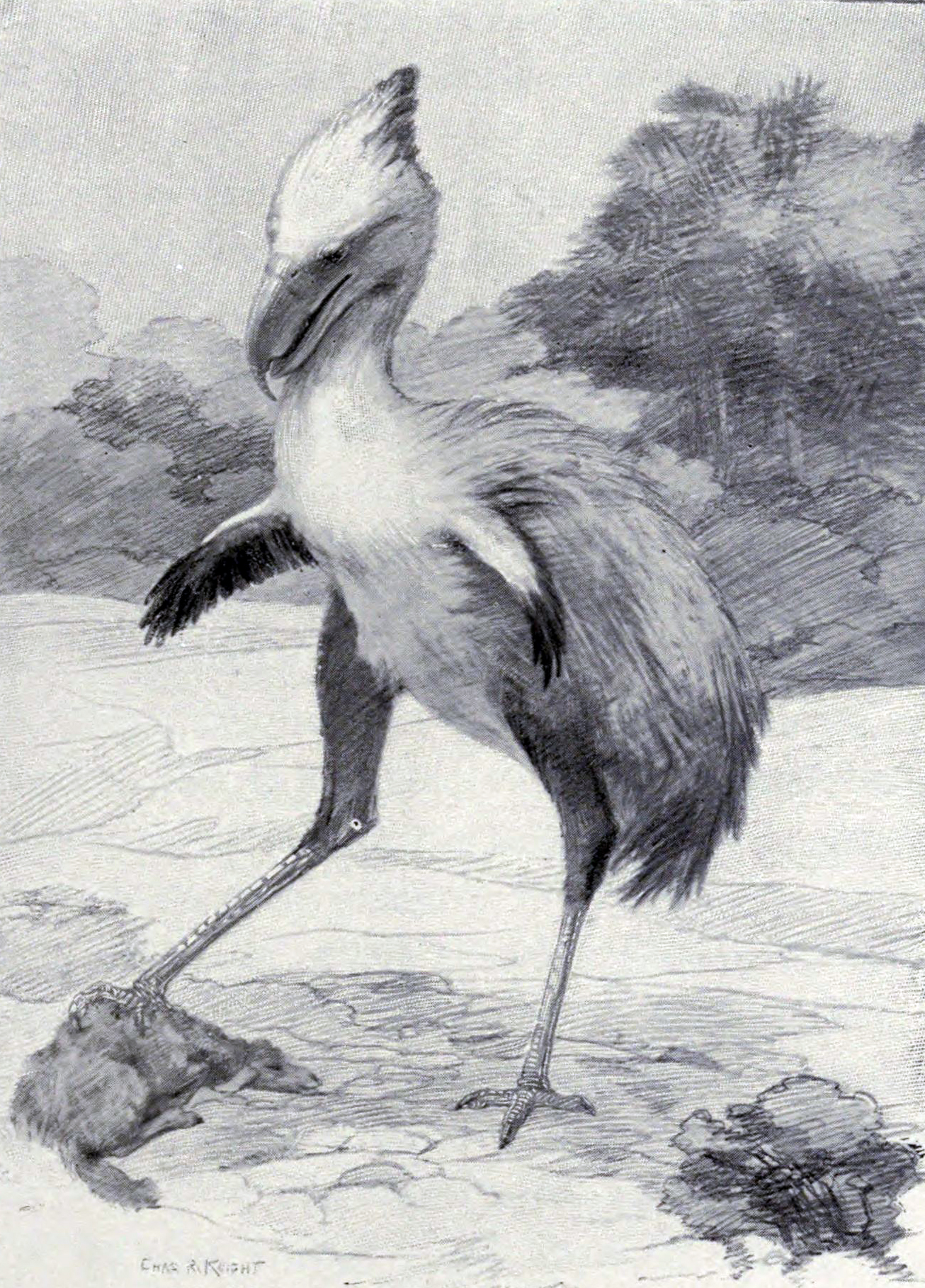
An outdated life restoration of P. longissimus hunting by American painter Charles R. Knight, 1901

In 2005, Uruguayan paleontologists Rudemar Ernesto Blanco and Washington W. Jones examined the strength of the tibiotarsus (shin bone) of phorusrhacids to determine their speed, but conceded that such estimates can be unreliable even for extant animals. While the tibiotarsal strength of Patagornis and an indeterminate large phorusrhacine, one comparable in size to Phorusrhacos, suggested a speed of 14 m/s (50 km/h; 31 mph), and that of Mesembriornis suggested 27 m/s (97 km/h; 60 mph), the latter is greater than that of a modern ostrich, approaching that of a cheetah, 29 m/s (100 km/h; 65 mph). They found these estimates unlikely due to the large body size of these birds, and instead suggested the strength could have been used to break the long bones of medium-sized mammals, the size, for example, of a saiga or Thomson's gazelle. This strength could be used for accessing the marrow inside the bones, or by using the legs as kicking weapons (like some modern ground birds do), consistent with the large, curved, and sideways compressed claws known in some phorusrhacids. They also suggested future studies could examine whether they could have used their beaks and claws against well-armored mammals such as armadillos and glyptodonts.

According to Argentine paleontologists Luis Chiappe and Sara Bertelli in a 2006 article, the discovery of Kelenken shed doubt on the traditional idea that the size and agility of phorusrhacids correlated, with the larger members of the group being more bulky and less adapted for running. The long and slender tarsometatarsus of Kelenken, a phorusrhacid similar in size and proportions to Phorusrhacos, instead shows that this bird may have been much swifter than the smaller, more heavyset and slow Brontornis. In a 2006 news article about the discovery, Chiappe stated that while Kelenken may not have been as swift as an ostrich, it could clearly run faster than had previously been assumed for large phorusrhacids, based on the long, slender leg-bones, superficially similar to those of the modern, flightless rhea. The article suggested that Kelenken would have been able to chase down small mammals and reptiles. This is especially true in Phorusrhacos, which bears more cursorial and agile adaptations than other giant phorusrhacids.

==== Skull and neck function ====
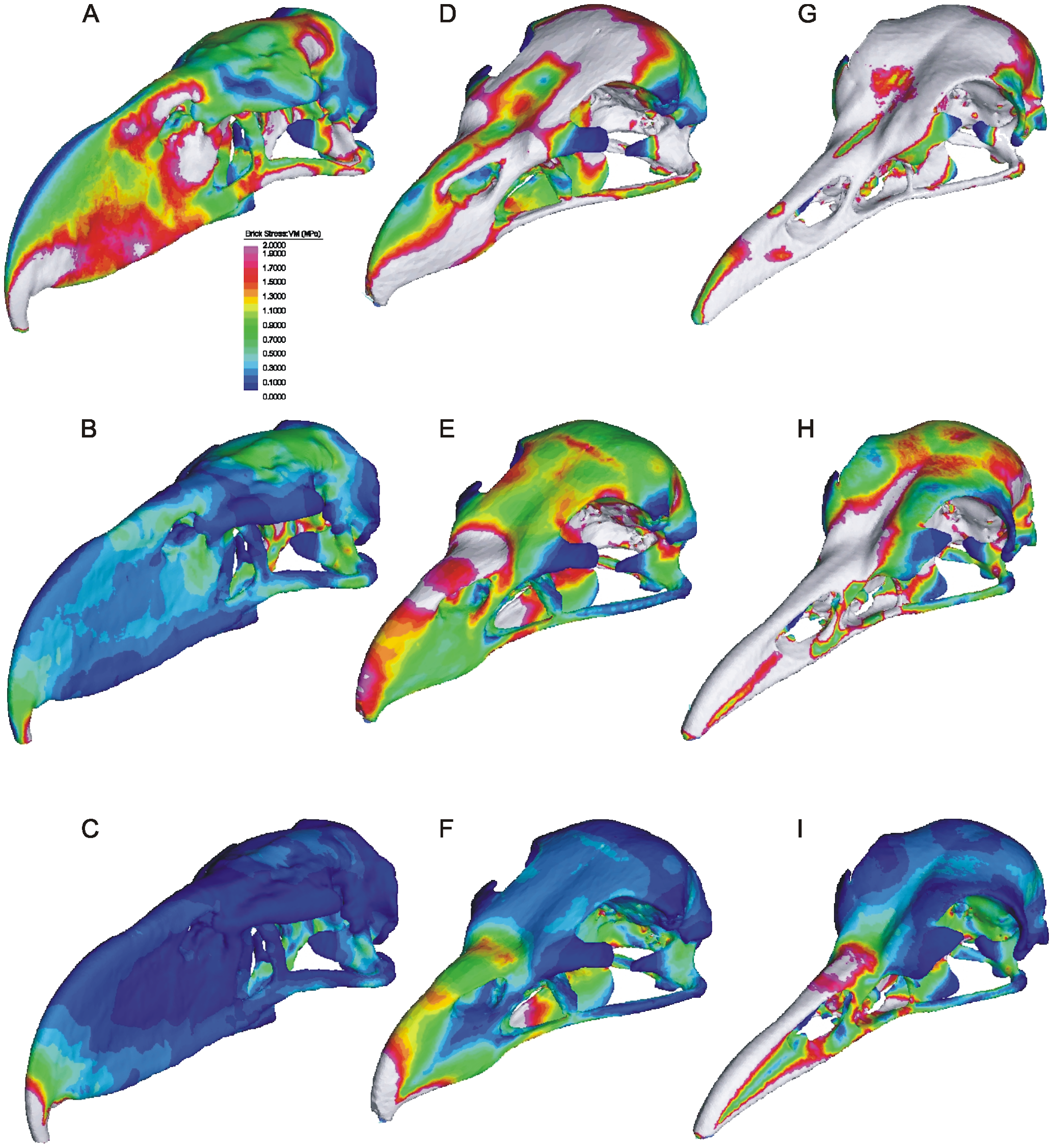
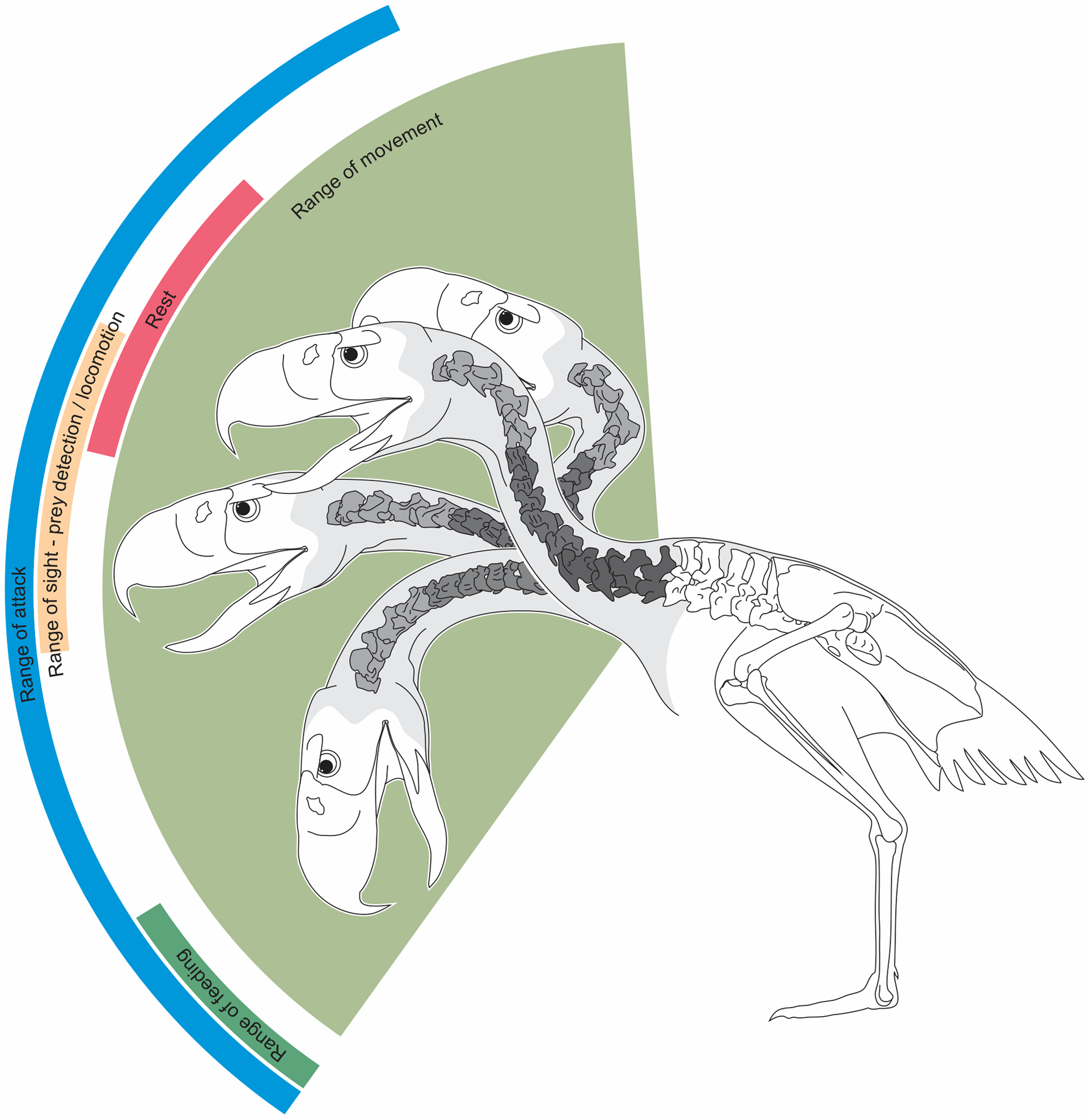
Stress distribution in bird skulls during various movements, including the related Andalgalornis (left, A–C, the other skulls belong to a red-legged seriema and a white-tailed eagle), and hypothetical upwards-and-downwards range of movement of the neck in the same genus (right)

In 2012, Degrange and colleagues estimated Phorusrhacos' bite force to have been 196 Newtons, which they concluded was correlated with body mass in phorusrhacids as smaller taxa like Patagornis and Psilopterus had significantly lower bite forces. A 2010 study by Degrange and colleagues of the medium-sized phorusrhacid Andalgalornis, a close relative of Phorusrhacos, based on Finite Element Analysis using CT scans, estimated its bite force and stress distribution in its skull. They found its bite force to be lower at 133 newtons at the bill tip, and showed it had lost a large degree of intracranial immobility (mobility of skull bones in relation to each other), as was also the case for other large phorusrhacids such as Phorusrhacos. This suggests that the skull was weak at the sides and midline, indicating that it was unlike that Andalgalornis engaged in risky behaviors, such as predating on large prey. Instead, the authors stated it either fed on smaller prey or used a repetitive striking motion with the beak to dispatch large animals. Struggling prey could also be restrained with the feet, despite the lack of sharp talons.

A 2012 follow-up study by Tambussi and colleagues analyzed the flexibility of the neck of Andalgalornis, based on the morphology of its neck vertebrae, finding the neck to be divided into three sections. By manually manipulating the vertebrae, they concluded that the neck musculature and skeleton of Andalgalornis was adapted to carrying a large head, and for helping it rise from a maximum extension after a downwards strike, and the researchers assumed the same would be true for other large, big-headed phorusrhacids like Phorusrhacos. A 2020 study of phorusrhacid skull morphology by Degrange found that there were two main morphotypes within the group, derived from a seriema-like ancestor. These were the "Psilopterine Skull Type", which was plesiomorphic (more similar to the ancestral type), and the "Terror Bird Skull Type", which included Phorusrhacos and other phorusrhacines, that was more specialized, with more rigid and stiff skulls. Despite the differences, studies have shown the two types handled prey similarly, while the more rigid skulls and resulting larger bite force of the "Terror Bird" type would have been an adaptation to handling larger prey.

== Paleoecology ==
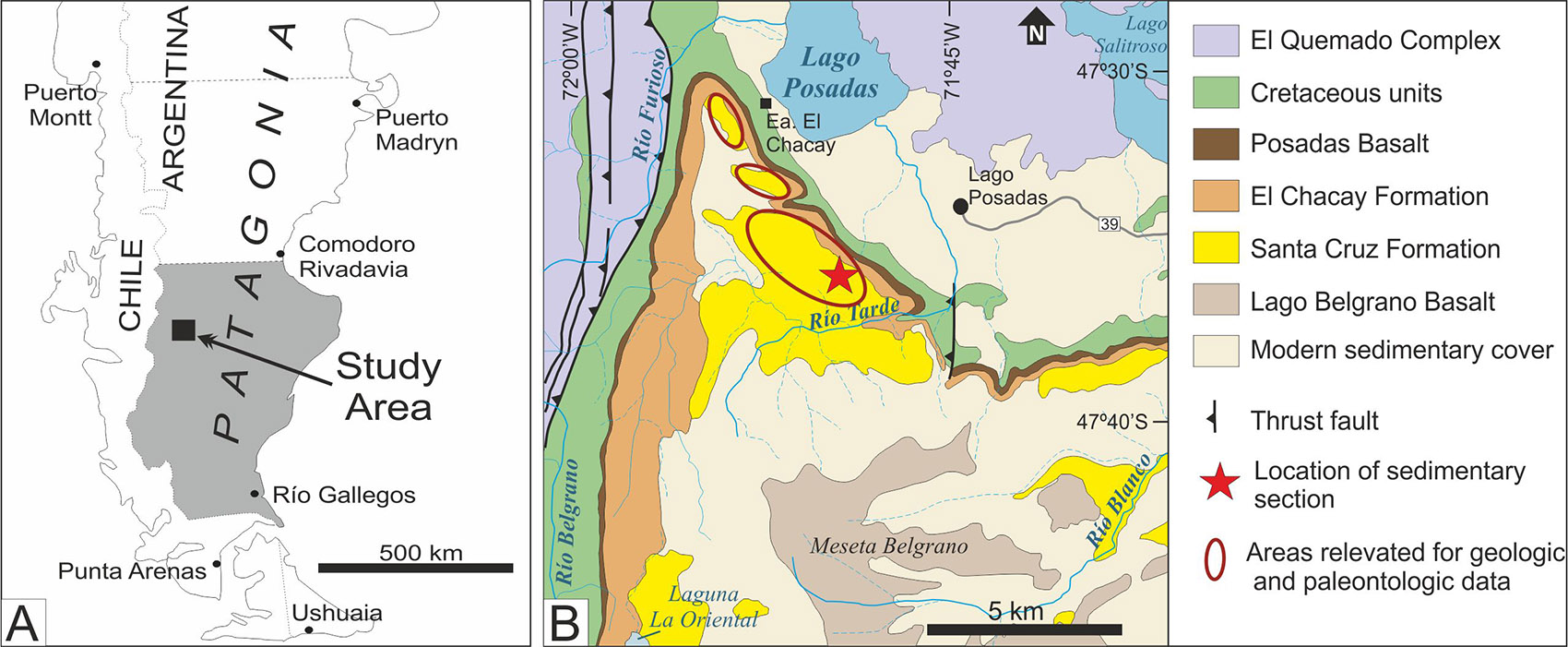
Map of the Santa Cruz Formation, where Phorusrhacos is primarily known

Phorusrhacos is known from multiple sites, mostly from outcrops of the Santa Cruz Formation along the Atlantic coast of southern Argentina. Fragmentary remains have also been described from strata of the early-mid Miocene Cerro Boleadoras Formation, which dates to between 16.5 to 15.1 million years ago, and the Monte León Formation, which dates to between 17.7 and 16 million years ago, in Monte León. All of these formations correspond to the Santacrucian SALMA, which dates to the early Miocene stage (18 to 14 million years ago) of the Neogene. Phorusrhacos is among the most common and widely distributed phorusrhacids.

The Santa Cruz Formation featured a heterogeneous environment composed of gallery forests, semi-arid and semi-deciduous forests, and open savannas, though grasses were not as common in the Santacrucian than they are now. Open, dry savanna conditions like these were suitable for pursuit predators like Phorusrhacos. This formation also had open shrubland dotted with patches of woodlands, marshes, and seasonally flooded water bodies. The climate was relatively warm, humid, and tropical, comparable to the Atlantic inland forests of Argentina and the dry Chaco region of Paraguay. Its forested areas were clouded by Araucaria conifers, Nothofagus beeches, and laurels among other trees, while grasses like pooideans blanketed the ground. Permanent bodies of water such as lakes, ponds and streams are likely to have been present, which sported frogs like Calyptocephalella, waterbirds like Ankonetta, Eutelornis, and Kaikenia, and the astrapothere Astrapotherium.

Many Santacrucian birds were present, including at least 18 species in 15 genera and nine families. This period is considered the peak of phorsurhacid diversity, though it was nearly extinct by the Pleistocene. Other birds known from the formation include the phorusrhacids Patagornis and Psilopterus, the enigmatic Brontornis, the rhea relative Opisthodactylus, the falcon Thegornis, the piscivorous darters Liptornis and Macranhinga, and the possible spoonbill Protibis. A menagerie of carnivorous mammals is known as well, such as the sparassodonts Borhyaena, Acrocyon, Arctodictis, and Lycopsis and the hathliacynid Cladosictis. Megaherbivorous mammals are represented by ground sloths like Prepotherium and Eucholoeops, notoungulate toxodontids Nesodon and Adinotherium, the homalodotheriid Homalodotherium, and the litopterns Diadiaphorus, Theosodon, and Tetramerorhinus. As for smaller herbivores, interatheriids like Cochilius, Interatherium, and Protypotherium, anteater Protamandua, cingulates like Cochlops, Peltephilus, and Propalaehoplophorus, rodents like Perimys, Eocardia, and Steiromys are known.

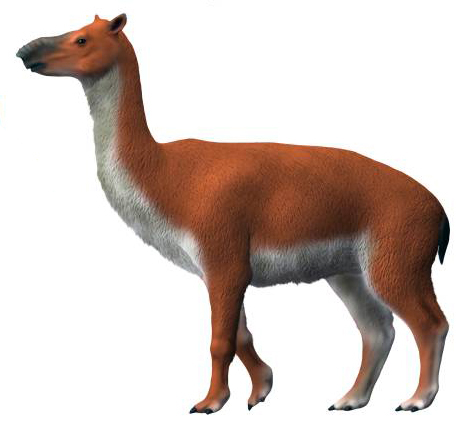
Litopterns such as Theosodon (depicted), were possible prey for Phorusrhacos

In Santacrucian ecosystems, Phorusrhacos likely preyed upon giant (>100 kilograms (220 lb)) mammals such as notoungulates and litopterns, and potentially immature astrapotheres, toxodontids, and homalodotheriids. Smaller cingulates and unarmored xenarthrans also could have been prey for Phorusrhacos. Sparassodonts, especially the cursorial Borhyaena, were likely a major competitor to Phorusrhacos for food. However, unlike Borhyaena, most sparassodonts were scansorial and occupied forested environments, whereas Phorusrhacos hunted in open environments, creating niche partitioning between the two groups. During the Deseadan SALMA (which corresponds to the late Oligocene-early Miocene, 29-21 mya) of Santa Cruz Province, Physornis had a graviportal macropedatory role. However, Deseadan woodland habitats transitioned to open, savanna-like landscapes into the Santacrucian, leading to Physornis' extinction. As a result, Phorusrhacos became Physornis' successor as a macropredator in Santa Cruz ecosystems as it was better adapted to hunting in open landscapes.

Phorusrhacids were present in South America from the Paleocene (when the continent was an isolated island) and survived until the Pleistocene. They also appeared in North America at the end of the Pliocene, during the Great American Biotic Interchange, and while fossils from Europe have been assigned to the group, their classification is disputed. It is unclear where the group originated; both cariamids and phorusrhacids may have arisen in South America, or arrived from elsewhere when southern continents were closer together or when sea levels were lower. Phorusrhacos itself lived during the early-middle Miocene, about 18 to 14 million years ago. Since phorusrhacids survived until the Pleistocene, they appear to have been more successful than for example the South American metatherian thylacosmilid predators (which disappeared in the Pliocene), and it is possible that they competed ecologically with placental predators that entered from North America in the Pleistocene.
