= MLPS =

MLPS may refer to:

- Martin Luther Preparatory School, a school located in Prairie du Chien, Wisconsin, USA, from 1979 to 1995
- Multi-level Protection Scheme in digital supply chain security

== See also ==
- Minneapolis, Minnesota, USA (sometimes incorrectly abbreviated MLPS, Mlps.), correctly abbreviated as MPLS or Mpls.
- MLP (disambiguation) for the singular of MLPs
