= Mangalore Premier League =

Mangalore Premier League (MPL) is an Indian Twenty20 cricket league established by the Karnataka State Cricket Association(KSCA).

The IPL players K C Cariappa, Kings Punjab, Shivil Kaushik, Gujarat Lions and Kishore Kamath of Mumbai Indians played in the MPL 2016 which gave a boost to the tournament. All the matches were live telecast in local television channels and the matches from quarter final on wards were live on DD Sports Channel.

== Teams ==
The players of KSCA Mangalore zone, born in Dakshina Kannada, Udupi and Kodagu districts and working or studying in Mangaluru zone, are eligible to take part in the selection trials. The teams from different places of Mangalore zone will be divided into two pools. The participating teams are from Mangalore, Kundapur, Udupi/Manipal, Karkala/Moodbidri, Surthakal/Mulki, Bantwal/Belthangady, Puttur/Sullia, Ullal, Madikeri and Virajpet.

2016 edition of league featured below 12 franchise.

- Surathkal Strikers
- Coastaldigest Mangaluru
- United Ullal
- Udupi Tigers
- Karavali Warriors
- President Sixers, Kundapur
- Kankanadi Knight Riders
- Team Elegant Moodbidri
- Red Hawks Kudla
- Karkala Gladiators
- Spark Avengers, Bolar
- Maestro Titan

Mangalore Premier League 2018 Season 4 featured below 12 franchise.

- Coastaldigest Mangaluru
- United Ullal
- Wise Warriors
- T4 Super Kings
- Classic Bantwal
- Mangalore United
- Team Elegant
- Bedra Bulls
- Karkala Gladiators
- Ali Warriors
- Maestro Titan
- AK Sports Udupi
