= MLP =

MLP may refer to:

== Groups, organizations, companies ==
- Master limited partnership, a type of business entity
- MLP SE (formerly Marschollek, Lautenschläger und Partner), a German financial services consulting firm
- Major League Productions, a British record label
- Manchester Literary and Philosophical Society (M. L. & P.), a British learned society
- Marriage Law Project, an organization against same-sex marriage
- Maui Land & Pineapple Company (ML&P), an American land holding company in Hawaii
- Municipal Light & Power (ML&P), Anchorage, Alaska, USA; the municipal electric utility

=== Sports ===
- Major League Pickleball, a professional pickleball league
- Maple Leaf Pro Wrestling, a professional wrestling promotion and revival of Frank Tunney's Maple Leaf Wrestling

=== Political parties ===
- Marxist–Leninist Party (disambiguation)
- Hungarian Liberal Party (Hungarian: Magyar Liberális Párt), a liberal political party in Hungary
- Malta Labour Party
- Manitoba Labour Party, a defunct left-wing political party in Manitoba, Canada
- Manitoba Liberal Party, a centrist political party in Manitoba, Canada
- Manx Labour Party, a political party on the Isle of Man
- Melanesian Liberal Party, a political party in Papua New Guinea
- Memel Agricultural Party (German: Memelländische Landwirtschaftspartei), a defunct pro-German political party in the Memel Territory
- Mexican Liberal Party, an anarchist group co-founded by Ricardo Flores Magón in 1905, in opposition to the rule of Porfirio Díaz

== Computing ==
- Memory-level parallelism, a computer architecture feature
- Meridian Lossless Packing, a lossless compression codec for audio data
- Micro Leadframe Package, a surface mount integrated circuit package
- Mobile Location Protocol, an application-level protocol for receiving the position of Mobile Stations
- Multilayer perceptron, a class of artificial neural network
- Multilink PPP, a networking technology
- Multilink Procedure, a networking technology

== People ==
- Master of Legal Practice (M. L. P.), a law degree; a type of Master of Laws
- Mid-level practitioner, a category of health-care providers with less training and more restricted scope of practice than physicians
- Marine Le Pen (born 1968), a French politician
- Mauricio López-Roberts (1873–1940), Spanish noble, diplomat and politician

== Transportation and vehicular ==
- Mobile Landing Platform, original name for the Expeditionary Transfer Dock of the United States Navy
- Mobile launcher platform, a steel structure to support the launch vehicles
- Volkswagen Group MLB platform, from German Modularer Längsbaukasten

== Other uses ==
- Bargam language (ISO 639 language code: mlp), a Papuan language
- Municipal Light Plant, historic building in Columbus, Ohio, US
- Mini-LP (mini-album), a short record album
- My Little Pony, a toy originating in the 1980s which has also spawned multiple TV shows
- /mlp/, the My Little Pony board on 4chan
- Machine-learned interatomic potential

== See also ==
- MLPS (disambiguation)
