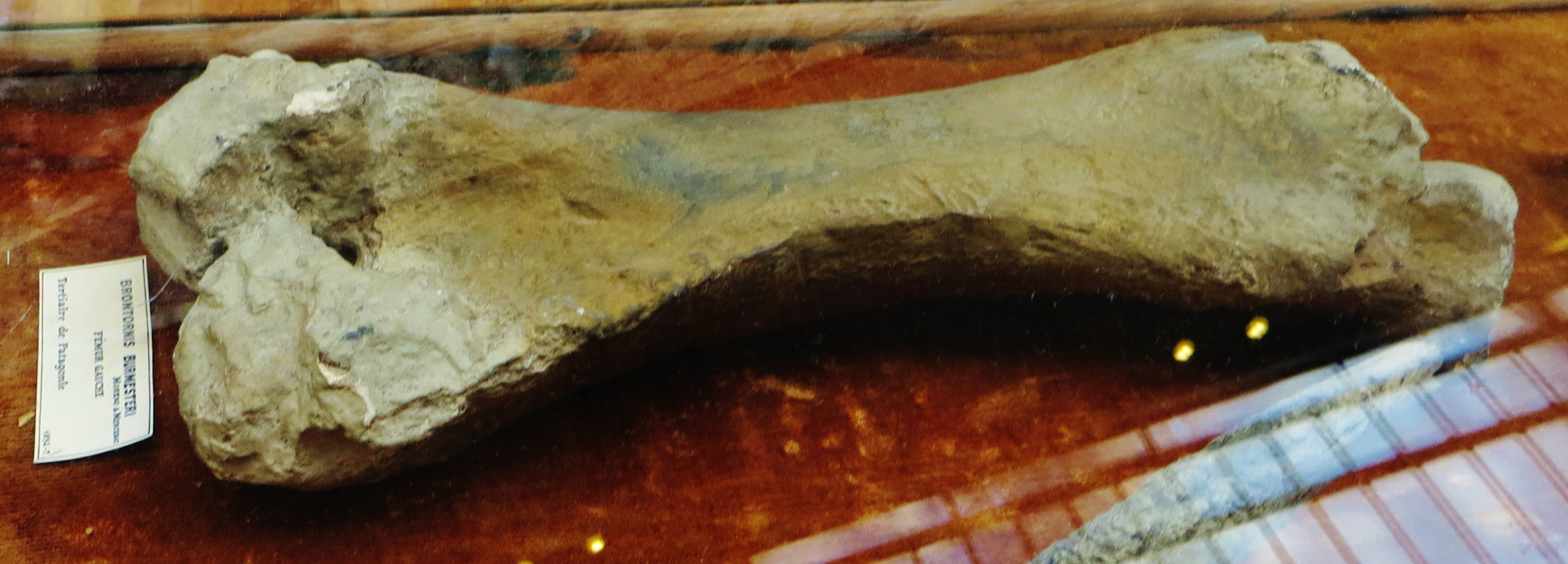
- Fossil femur
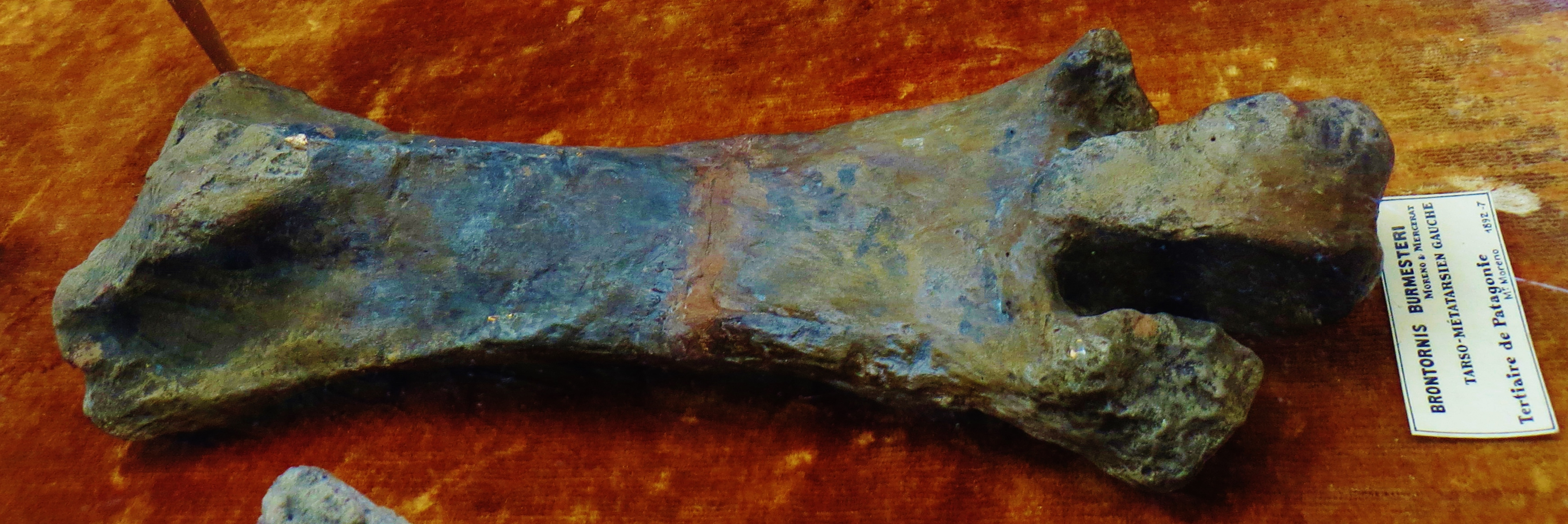
- Fossil tarsometatarsus

Scientific classification
- Kingdom: Animalia
- Phylum: Chordata
- Class: Aves
- Infraclass: Neognathae
- Genus: †Brontornis; Moreno & Mercerat 1891

Type species
- †Brontornis burmeisteri Moreno & Mercerat 1891

Synonyms
- Genus synonymy: Rostrornis Moreno & Mercerat 1891; Liornis Moreno & Mercerat 1891 (in part); Species synonymy: Rostrornis floweri Moreno & Mercerat 1891; Brontornis platyonyx Ameghino 1895; Liornis floweri Ameghino 1895

= Brontornis =

Brontornis Temporal range: Early-Mid Miocene (Santacrucian-Laventan) ~17.5–11.6 Ma

Extinct genus of birds

Brontornis is an extinct genus of giant bird that inhabited Argentina during the Early to Middle Miocene. Its taxonomic position is highly controversial, with authors alternatively considering it to be a cariamiform, typically a phorusrhacid (terror bird) or an anserimorph.

== Taxonomy ==
The first fossils of Brontornis burmeisteri were described by paleontologists Francisco Moreno and Alcides Mercerart in 1891, the fossils being a left femur, tibiotarsus, fibula, and tarsometatarsus all from the same individual found in the Lower-Middle Miocene strata of the Santa Cruz Formation in Santa Cruz Province, Argentina. In the same paper, two distal tibiotarsi from the same area were referred to Brontornis as well. Unknowingly, Moreno & Mercerat also named a species now seen as synonymous with Brontornis burmeisteri, Rostrornis floweri, that includes: various bill and skull fragments, seven vertebrae and fragments, femoral head, lower part of left femur, ectocondyle of right tibiotarsus. Some pedal phalanges and a trochleae of tarsometatarsus were also referred to the type, but they haven't been described in detail. These fossils were found in the lower Miocene Monte León Formation, one of the two formations the taxon is definitively known from. Some additional fossils, including a quadrate, were referred to Brontornis by Moreno & Mercerart in 1891, but these were dubiously referred. Mercerat named another taxon synonymized with Brontornis, Stephanornis princeps, in 1893, though the fossil is now lost so this assessment is unverifiable.

Moreno's rival, Florentino Ameghino, also found fossils of Brontornis which he named Brontornis platyonyx in 1895 based on four pedal phalanges found at Monte Leon. The species has been synonymized with Brontornis. Ameghino also named Liornis floweri based on a distal tibiotarsus, distal tarsometatarsus, and two pedal phalanges of a juvenile that was synonymized with Brontornis in 1967. Liornis minor was also synonymized in 1967, but it has since been synonymized with Phorusrhacos. Callornis giganteus, another Ameghino taxon, may also be a synonym of Brontornis or a distinct close relative. Recently, the affinities of some Brontornis specimens has come into question due to the uncertain and debated phylogenetic position of the genus and its synonyms.

=== Evolution ===
Recent work has cast doubt on the hypothesis that Brontornis is a phorusrhacid. Brontornis may actually represent an anseriform, with other genera traditionally assigned to Brontornithinae (Physornis and Paraphysornis) being true phorusrhacids. The subfamily containing the latter two had been proposed to be renamed to Physornithinae, with Physornis fortis as the type species. If these conclusions are valid, this would mean that there are three groups of giant basal anseriformes, in chronological order of divergence: the gastornithids (Gastornis and kin), Brontornis, and finally the mihirungs of Australia. However, other analyses have also argued that Brontornis exhibits thoracic vertebrae diagnostic of phorusrhacids, supporting its placement within that group.

Brontornis is a genus of birds (Aves), which is sometimes referred to its own family Brontornithidae. These are very large, flightless birds from the Miocene of South America and are known from very fragmentary material. The exact systematic assignment of Brontornis and the Brontornithidae is very uncertain and in a constant flux, which is largely due to the fragmentary nature of the remains. Originally placed on the base of the Phorusrhacidae ("terror birds"), there are several different views on its classification today. After several cladistic studies, the Brontornithidae have been found as basal geese relatives. On the other hand, they also form the sister group of the Cariamiformes, which combine today's seriema and the Phorusrhacidae. Since the introduction of the Brontornithidae as a family group, this has mostly been considered monogeneric or monospecific. Some authors have considered other genera as possible relatives, but most of these have been regarded as synonyms of Brontornis or Phorusrhacos. However, a tibiotarsus of a large bird similar to Brontornis was found in Oligocene strata in Salla-Luribay, Bolivia, making it the oldest known Brontornithid fossil known.

Traditionally, Brontornis was usually attributed as a genus to the extinct family of the Phorusrhacidae ("Terror birds"), which was quite widespread in South America and comprises large to very large, mostly predatory birds. These are related to the seriama, sharing features such as a hook-shaped upper beak and the curved ungues, which had sharp claws and thus distinguish the birds as predatory carnivores. Within the Phorusrhacids, Brontornis was referred to their own subfamily of Brontornithinae, very large and massive birds which also included physical territories and paraphysis. The allocation to the Phorusrhacidae was mainly based on the strong lower jaw symphysis and the targeted Tarsometatatarsus at the front and back, and was supported by Herculano M. F. Alvarenga and Elizabeth Höfling in 2003. A revision of the genre of Federico L. Agnolin in 2007 rejects the assignment based on these characteristics to the Phorusrhacids, since they also occur in other early large running birds, for example in Anserimorphs or within the Dromornithidae. The rotation of the middle shape of the Tibiotarsus and the construction of the square leg suggest for a closer relationship with the goose family (aneriform) rather than Phorusrhacidae. For these reasons, Brontornis was excluded from the Phorusrhacids and moved to the base of the goose birds by Agnolin. Physornis and Paraphysornis, on the other hand, have been considered close relatives of Brontornis in their own subfamily in Phorusrhacidae, Brontornithinae, though it is sometimes referred to as Physornithinae.

This phylogenetic position for Brontornis had originally been favored by the first descriptions of the genus, but Mathilde Dolgopol de Sáez classified it as a relative of geese and Gastornis in 1927. Subsequently, after Agnolin's revision, his analysis was met with some approval from other paleontologists, but disagreements from other.

A phylogenetic analysis of Phorusrhacidae in 2011 again concluded that Brontornis was justified in the placement with the special expression of a fragmented thoracic vertebrae. Once again, suggesting that Brontornis sat within Anserimorpha.

With other cladist analyses suggested the structure of resemble that of Anserimorphs. The lack of the striking bone footbridge (Pons Supratendineus) on the front of the lower joint of the tibiotarsus of Brontornis was also pointed out several times, which in occurs in the Phorusrhacidae. Furthermore, the short and robust construction of the mandible contrasts to the long and slim mandibles of Phorusrhacids, again suggested that Brontornis isn't a phorusrhacid. According to the examinations already mentioned, the different design of the lower jaw also results in a different diet of Brontornis than Phorusrhacids.

However, a study from 2017 suggested that Brontornis belonged to sister taxon to Cariamiformes. As a result, the genus moved close to the Phorusrhacidae, but not directly in it. Suggesting that the previous study a misinterpreted the orientation of the tarsometatarsus as a central point of systematic assignment of Brontornis. It was pointed out that, the previous studies only used sparse material of Brontornis. However, a 2021 study once again found Brontornis to be a Gastornithiform.

== Description ==
=== Size ===
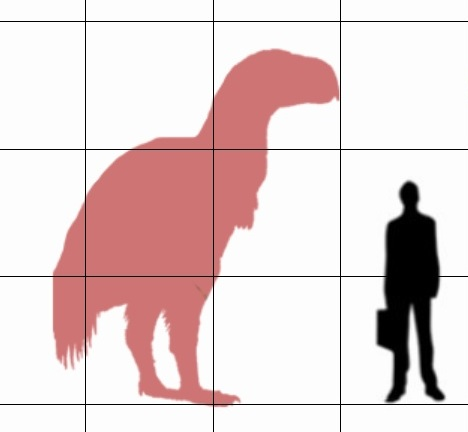
Brontornis (red) compared to a human

Due to the size of the finds, a height of 280 centimetres (9.2 ft) is assumed. The pronounced massiveness of the bones leads to weight estimates between 350 and 400 kilograms (770 and 880 lb) or 319 to 350 kilograms (703 to 772 lb), however, some finds have clear size differences that can reach up to 33% based on the tarsometatarsus. A comparison of the tarsometatarsi of two B. burmeisteri specimens, FM-P13259 and MLP-91 (lectotype), both coming from the same geographical region and geological formation, shows them as not to present any anatomical differences, apart from size, where in the first is around one third smaller than the second. The idea is that they are examples of intraspecific variation, possibly sexual dimorphism. There is the possibility that they represent two species. These measures would make Brontornis the fourth-heaviest bird found thus far, after Aepyornis maximus, Dromornis, and Pachystruthio.

== Paleobiology ==
=== Diet ===
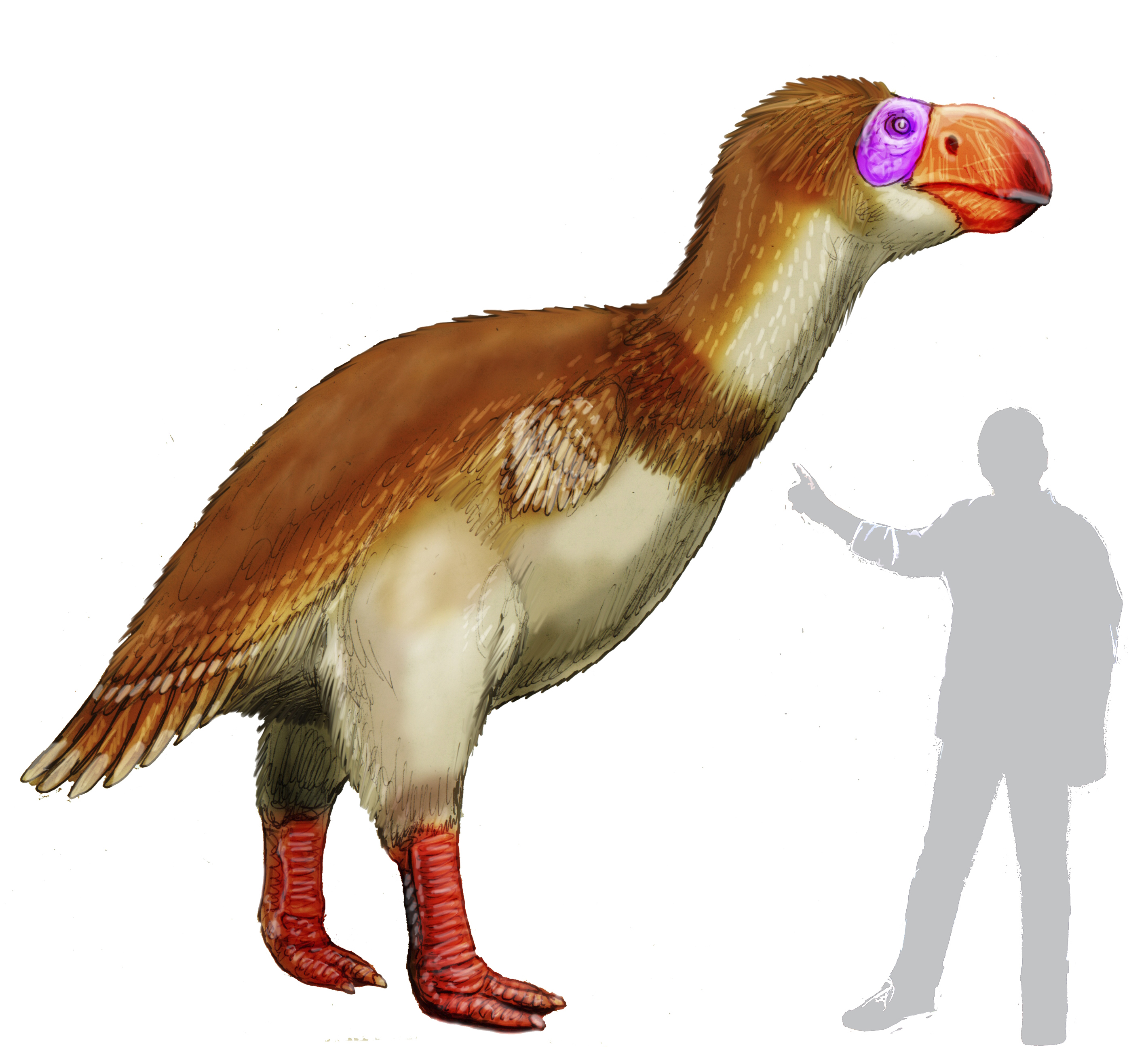
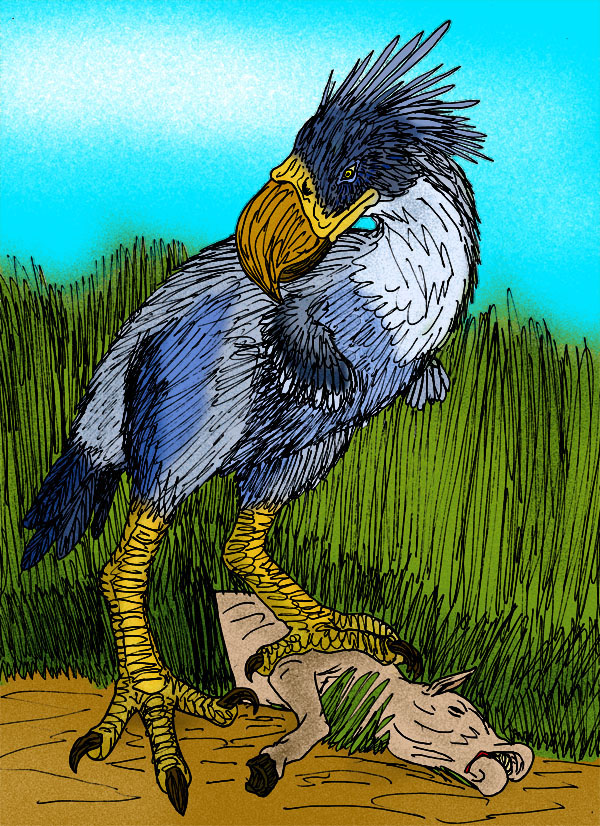
Speculative life restoration of Brontornis as an anserimorph (left), and as a Phorusrhacid (right).

There is uncertainty about the species' diet, due to the lack of well preserved skull material and overlap between specimens. Due to the original placement within the "terror birds" grouping, some researchers believe that Brontornis could have been a carrion eater. Correspondingly, art and skull reconstructions depicted Brontornis with a sharp and hooked top beak, though paleontologists are unsure because the tip of the preserved mandibles is missing.

Contrarily, some paleontologists have proposed an herbivorous diet for Brontornis. Studies on the lower jaw indicate that it was most likely not suitable for tearing animal food. The width and strong lower jaw is similar to that of Gastornis and Aepyornis, two herbivorous large birds. Likewise, the ungues of Brontornis do not show stronger bends compared to Phorusrhacids and thus do not allow raptor-like claws for tearing meat, which suggests a more plant-based diet. Considering its enormous body size, it is assumed that Brontornis inhabited more open landscapes, as they have also been proven for the Santa Cruz formation. The short and wide Tarsometatarsus compared to the Tibiotarsus suggests a slow locomotion adapted to the enormous body mass.
