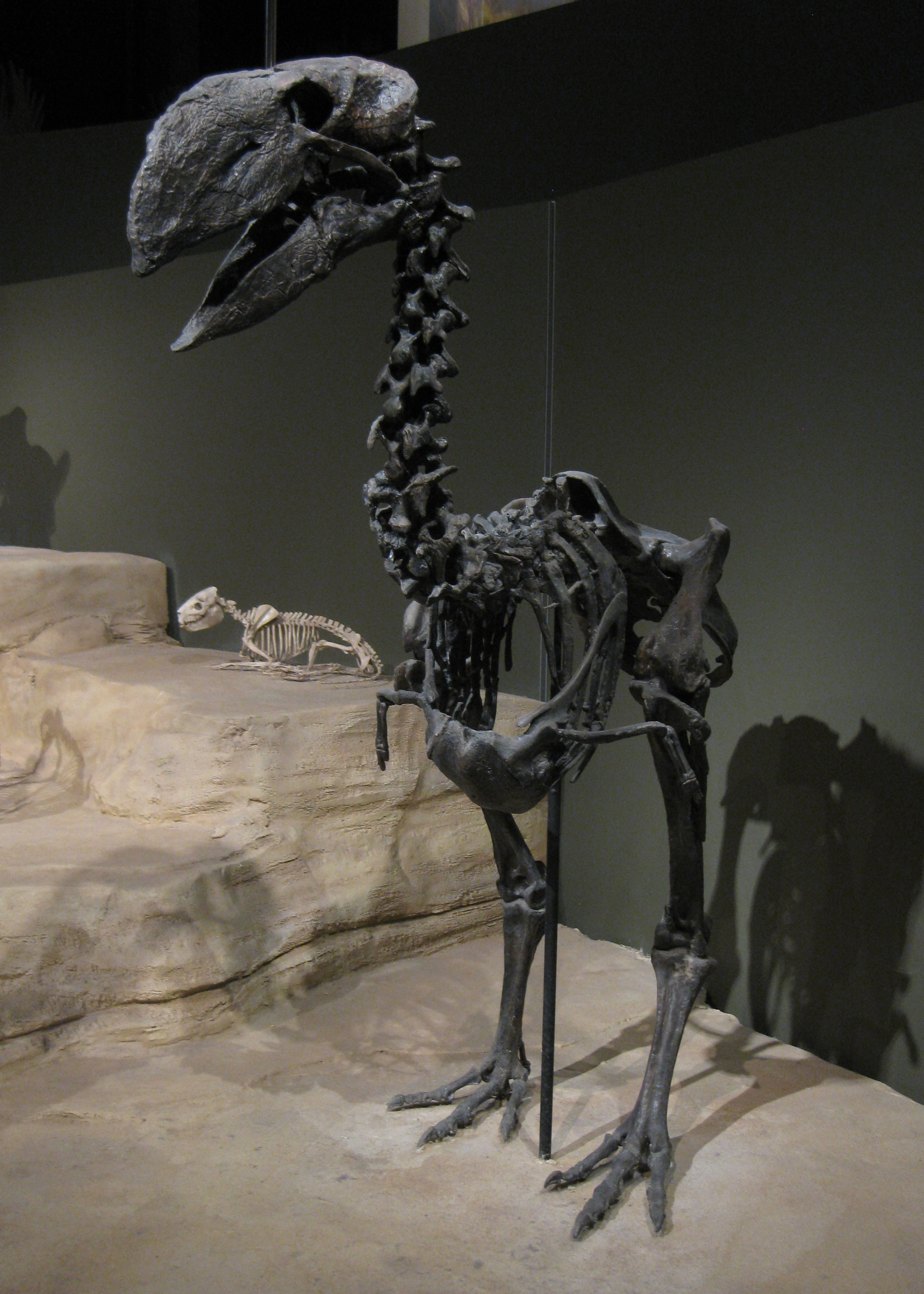
- Mounted skeleton of Gastornis giganteus, sometimes referred to as Diatryma gigantea

Scientific classification
- Kingdom: Animalia
- Phylum: Chordata
- Class: Aves
- Order: †Gastornithiformes
- Family: †Gastornithidae; Fürbringer, 1888
- Genus: †Gastornis; Hébert, 1855 (vide Prévost, 1855)

Type species
- †Gastornis parisiensis Hébert, 1855

Other species
- †G.? giganteus (Cope, 1876); †G.? sarasini Schaub, 1929; †G.? geiselensis Fischer, 1978; †G. russelli Martin, 1992; †G.? xichuanensis (Hou, 1980); †G. laurenti Mourer-Chauviré & Bourdon, 2020

Synonyms
- Palaeornis Bonaparte, 1856; Diatryma? Cope, 1876; Barornis? Marsh, 1894; Omorhamphus? Sinclair, 1928; Zhongyuanus? Hou, 1980

= Gastornis =

Gastornis Temporal range: Paleocene – mid Eocene, Selandian–Lutetian

Extinct genus of birds

Gastornis is an extinct genus of large, flightless birds that lived from the middle Paleocene to the middle Eocene epochs of the Paleogene. Most known fossils have been recovered from Europe, although species historically assigned to the genus have also been reported from North America and Asia. Several genera, including the well-studied Diatryma, have traditionally been regarded as junior synonyms of Gastornis. This classification has been challenged by more recent studies, however, and some researchers regard Diatryma as a distinct and valid genus.

Gastornis species were very large birds historically considered to be predators of small mammals, including early, diminutive equids. This interpretation has since been questioned by several lines of evidence. The absence of hooked claws in known Gastornis footprints, together with analyses of its beak morphology and the isotopic signatures of its bones, suggests that it was more likely herbivorous, feeding primarily on tough plant material and seeds. Gastornis is generally considered to be related to the Galloanserae, the clade comprising modern waterfowl and gamebirds.

== History ==
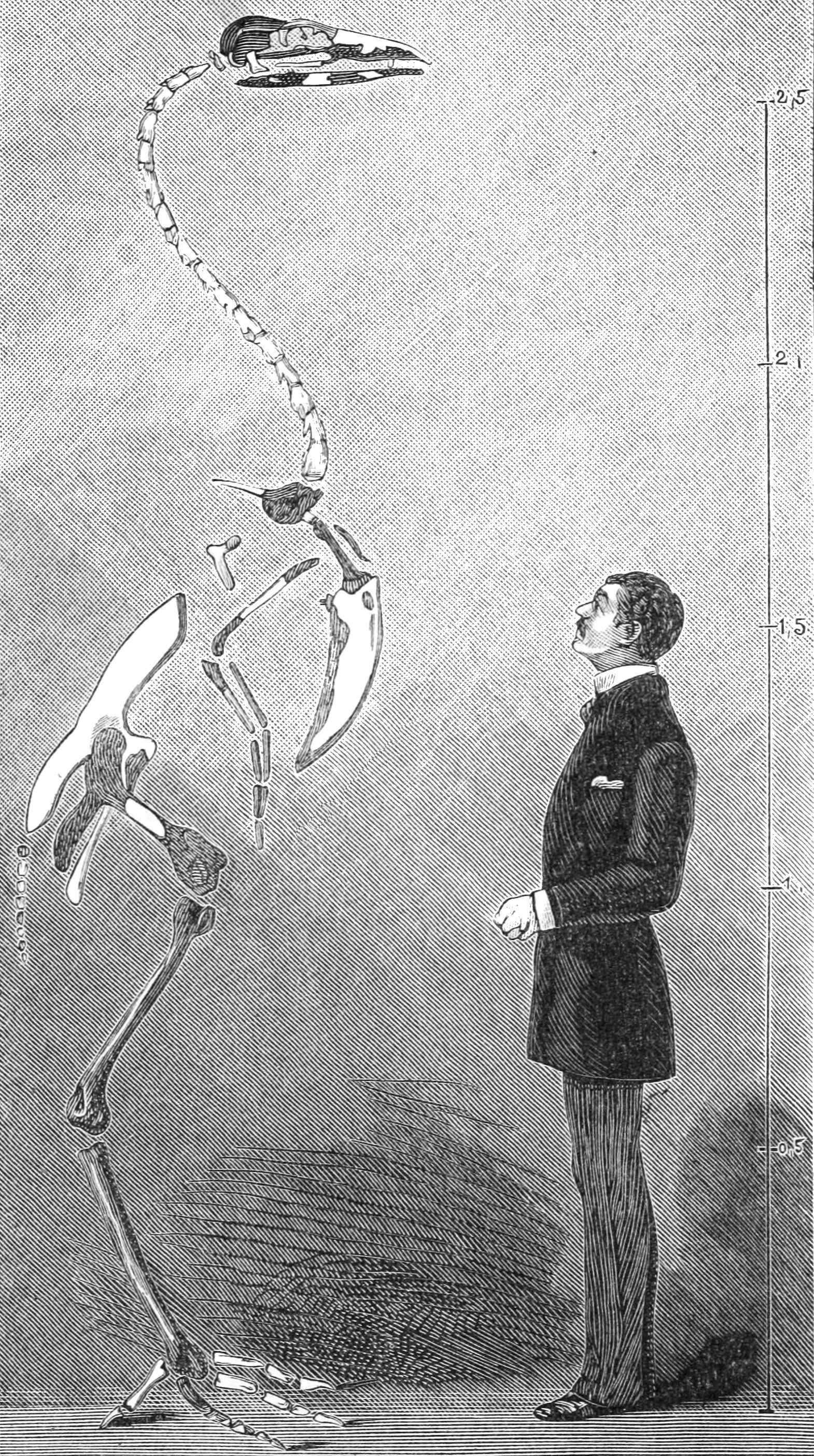
Lemoine's incorrect 1881 illustration of G. edwardsii (now G. parisiensis)

Gastornis was first described in 1855 from a fragmentary skeleton. It was named after Gaston Planté, described as a "studious young man full of zeal", who had discovered the first fossils in clay (Argile Plastique) formation deposits at Meudon, near Paris. The discovery was notable, due to the large size of the specimens, and because, at the time, Gastornis represented one of the oldest known birds. Additional bones of the first known species, G. parisiensis, were found in the mid-1860s. Somewhat more-complete specimens, then referred to the new species G. edwardsii (now considered a synonym of G. parisiensis), were found a decade later. These specimens, found in the 1870s, formed the basis for a widely circulated and reproduced skeletal restoration by Lemoine. The skulls of these original Gastornis fossils were unknown, other than nondescript fragments and several bones used in Lemoine's illustration, which turned out to be those of other animals. Thus, this European specimen was long reconstructed as a sort of gigantic "crane-like" bird.

In 1874, the American paleontologist Edward Drinker Cope discovered another fragmentary set of fossils at the Wasatch Formation, New Mexico. Cope considered the fossils to be of a distinct genus and species of giant ground bird; in 1876, he named the remains Diatryma gigantea (/ˌdaɪ.əˈtraɪmə/ DY-ə-TRY-mə), from the Ancient Greek διάτρημα (diatrema), meaning "through a hole", in reference to the large foramina (perforations) that penetrated some of the foot bones. In 1894, a single gastornithid toe bone from New Jersey was described by Cope's "rival" Othniel Charles Marsh, and classified as a new genus and species: Barornis regens. In 1911, it was recognized that this, too, could be considered a junior synonym of Diatryma (and therefore, later, Gastornis). Additional, fragmentary specimens were found in Wyoming in 1911, and assigned (in 1913) to the new species Diatryma ajax (also now considered a synonym of G. giganteus). In 1916, an American Museum of Natural History expedition to the Bighorn Basin (Willwood Formation, Wyoming) found the first nearly-complete skull and skeleton, which was described in 1917 and gave scientists their first clear picture of the bird. Matthew, Granger, and Stein (1917) classified this specimen as yet another new species, Diatryma steini.

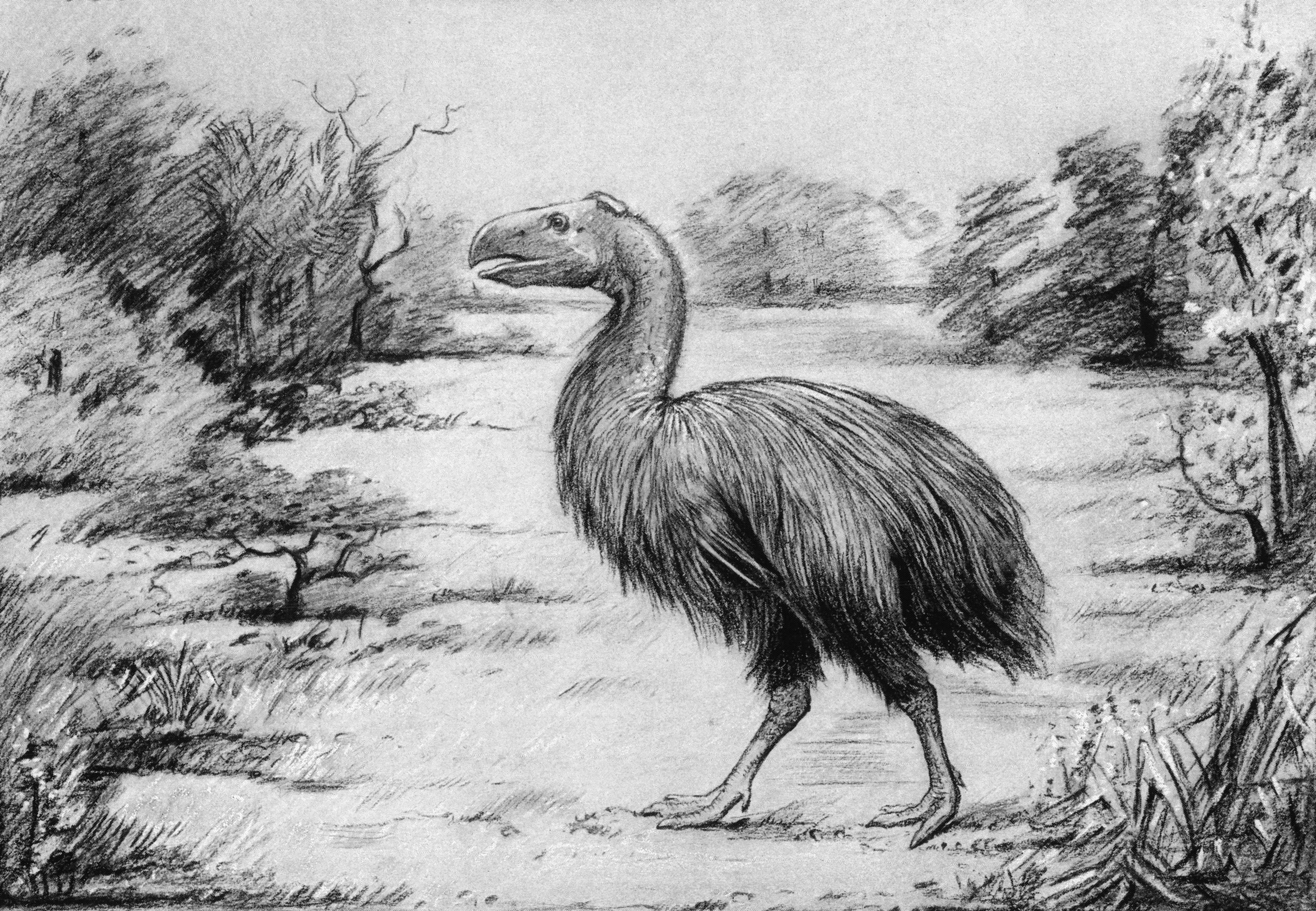
Life restoration of G. steini (now G. giganteus) with outdated, ratite-like plumage, 1917

After the description of Diatryma, most new European specimens were referred to this genus, instead of Gastornis; however, after the initial discovery of Diatryma, researchers recognized the similarity between the two genera as early as 1884 when Elliott Coues placed Diatryma gigantea under the genus Gastornis as G. giganteus, a synonymy agreed upon by the American Ornithologists' Union in 1886. Further meaningful comparisons between Gastornis and Diatryma were made more difficult by Lemoine's incorrect skeletal illustration, the composite nature of which was not discovered until the early 1980s. Following this, several authors began to recognize a greater degree of similarity between the European and North American birds, often placing both in the same order (†Gastornithiformes) or even family (†Gastornithidae). This newly realized degree of similarity caused many scientists to, tentatively, accept the animals' synonymy pending a comprehensive review of the anatomy of both genera, in which Gastornis has the taxonomic priority. Some subsequent studies either continued to use the genus Diatryma or argued against the synonymy, since a detailed comparison of type specimens has not been done yet and notable differences can be found in the species originally assigned to Diatryma from the type species of Gastornis.

== Description ==
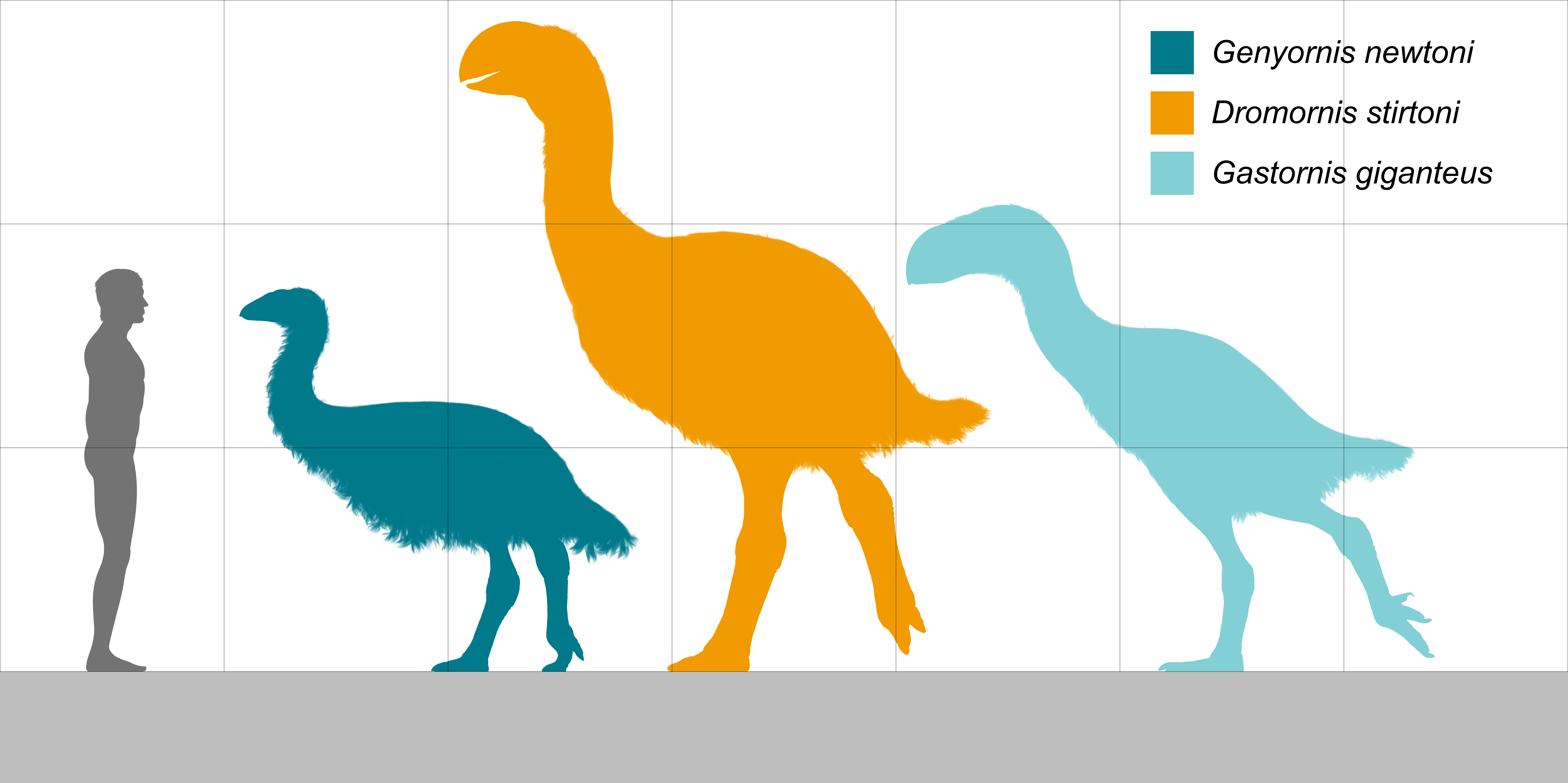
Size comparison of Gastornis giganteus (light blue) with the dromornithids (another group of flightless Galloanserae known from Australia) Dromornis and Genyornis

Gastornis is known from a large amount of fossil remains, but the clearest picture of the bird comes from a few nearly complete specimens of the species G. giganteus. These were generally very large birds, with huge beaks and massive skulls superficially similar to the carnivorous South American "terror birds" (phorusrhacids). The largest-known species, G. giganteus would have reached about 2.15 m (7 ft 1 in) in maximum height, and weighed up to 175–225 kg (386–496 lb) in mass.

The skull of G. giganteus was huge compared to the body and powerfully built. The beak was extremely tall and compressed (flattened from side to side). Unlike other species of Gastornis, G. giganteus lacked characteristic grooves and pits on the underlying bone. The 'lip' of the beak was straight, without a raptorial hook as found in the predatory phorusrhacids. The nostrils were small and positioned close to the front of the eyes about midway up the skull. The vertebrae were short and massive, even in the neck. The neck was relatively short, consisting of at least 13 massive vertebrae. The torso was relatively short. The wings were vestigial, with the upper wing-bones small and highly reduced, similar in proportion to the wings of the cassowary. A largely complete skull specimen (GMH XVIII-1178-1958) of G. geiselensis was also described in 2024 after its discovery in 1958. The upper beaks of G. geiselensis show possible sexual dimorphism and are wider than those of G. giganteus and proportionally longer than those of G. laurenti.

== Classification ==
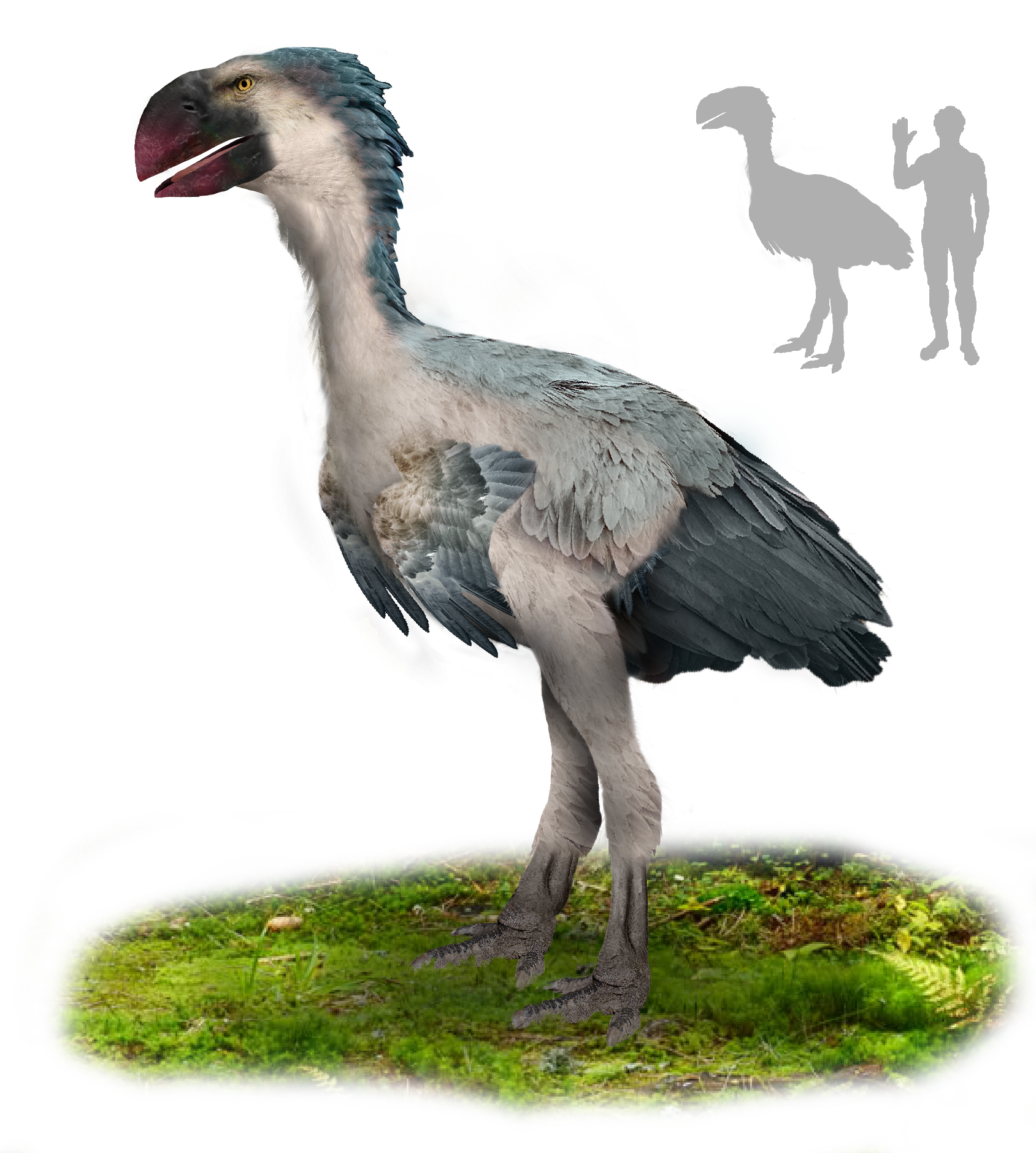
Restoration and size comparison

Gastornis and its close relatives are classified together in the family Gastornithidae, and were long considered to be members of the order Gruiformes. However, the traditional concept of Gruiformes has since been shown to be an unnatural grouping. Beginning in the late 1980s with the first phylogenetic analysis of gastornithid relationships, consensus began to grow that they were close relatives of the lineage that includes waterfowl and screamers, the Anseriformes. A 2007 study showed that gastornithids were a very early-branching group of anseriformes, and formed the sister group to all other members of that lineage.

Recognizing the apparent close relationship between gastornithids and waterfowl, some researchers classify gastornithids within the anseriform group itself. Others restrict the name Anseriformes only to the crown group formed by all modern species, and label the larger group, including extinct relatives of anseriformes like the gastornithids, with the name Anserimorphae. Gastornithids are therefore sometimes placed in their own order, Gastornithiformes. A 2024 study, however, found little support for Gastornithiformes and instead places Gastornis as a member of the Galliformes crown group, as more closely related to Phasianoidea than to megapodes, being sister to the extinct Sylviornithidae, a recently extinct group of medium-sized flightless birds known from subfossil deposits in the Western Pacific.

A simplified version of the family tree found by Agnolin et al. in 2007 is reproduced below.

- Anseriformes
  - †Gastornithidae
  - - †Brontornis
    - - †Dromornithidae
      - Anseres
        - Anatoidea (ducks & geese)
        - - Anseranatidae (magpie geese)
          - Anhimidae (screamers)

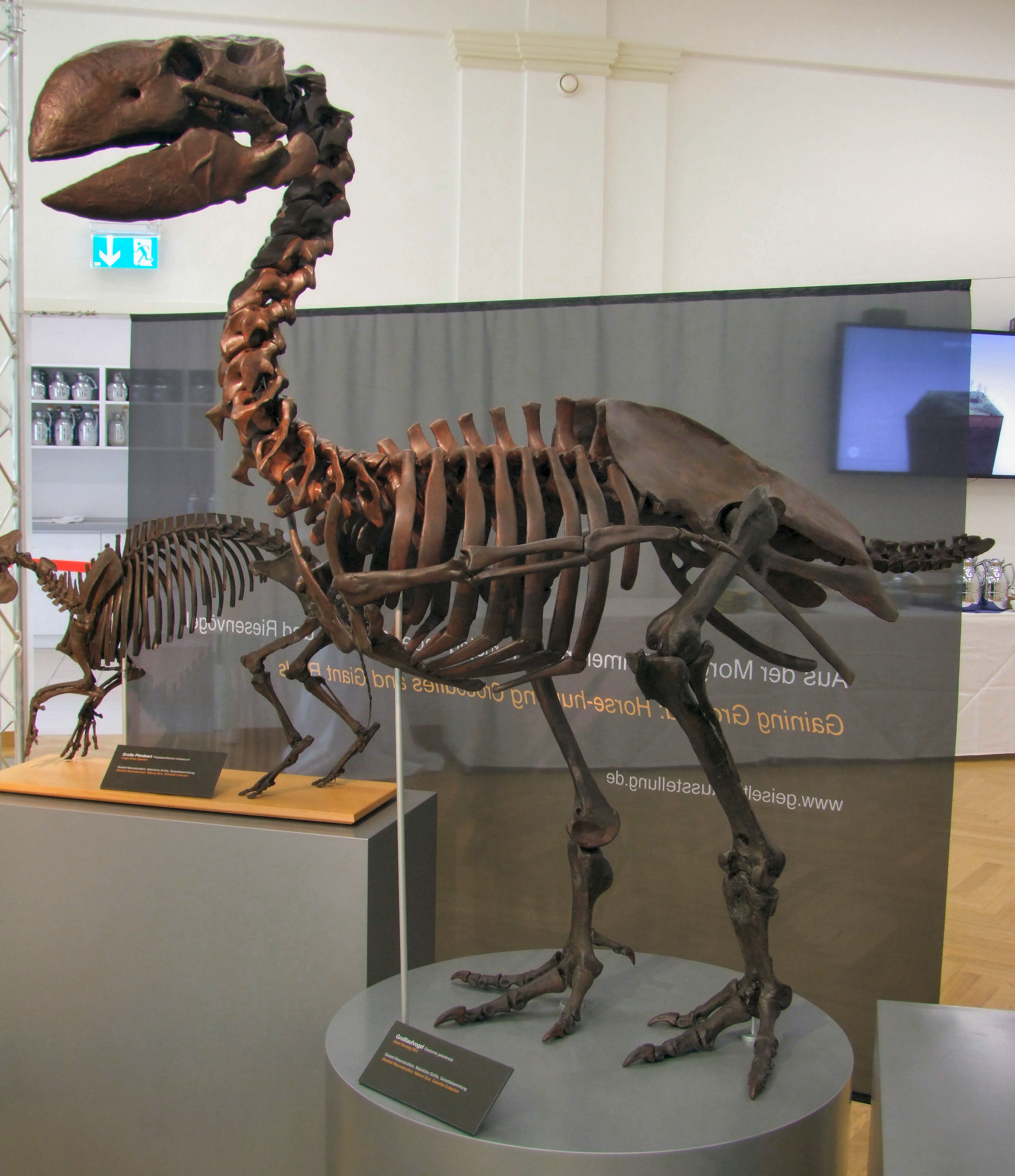
Reconstructed G. geiselensis skeleton

As of 2024, at least three species are confidently placed within the genus Gastornis: G. parisiensis (type species), G. russelli and G. laurenti. The type species, Gastornis parisiensis, was named and described by Hébert in two 1855 papers. It is known from fossils found in western and central Europe, dating from the late Paleocene to the early Eocene. Other species previously considered distinct, but which are now considered synonymous with G. parisiensis, include G. edwardsii (Lemoine, 1878) and G. klaasseni (Newton, 1885). Additional European species of Gastornis are G. russelli (Martin, 1992) from the late Paleocene of Berru, France, and G. sarasini (Schaub, 1929) from the early-middle Eocene. The supposed small species G. minor is considered to be a nomen dubium.

Eggshells and a tibiotarsus of Gastornis recovered in southwestern France near Saint-Papoul were originally classified as part of the type species G. parisiensis. In 2020, however, additional specimens from this location were identified as a distinct species and named G. laurenti, making them the most recently described species of Gastornis. The holotype (MHNT.PAL.2018.20.1) is a nearly complete mandible which differs from other species within the genus, and the paratypes consist of the maxilla, right quadrate, femur shaft, tibiotarsus (two left and one right) and six cervical vertebrae. A 2024 study attributed more postcranial remains from the same locality to G. laurenti.

=== Possible species and synonyms ===
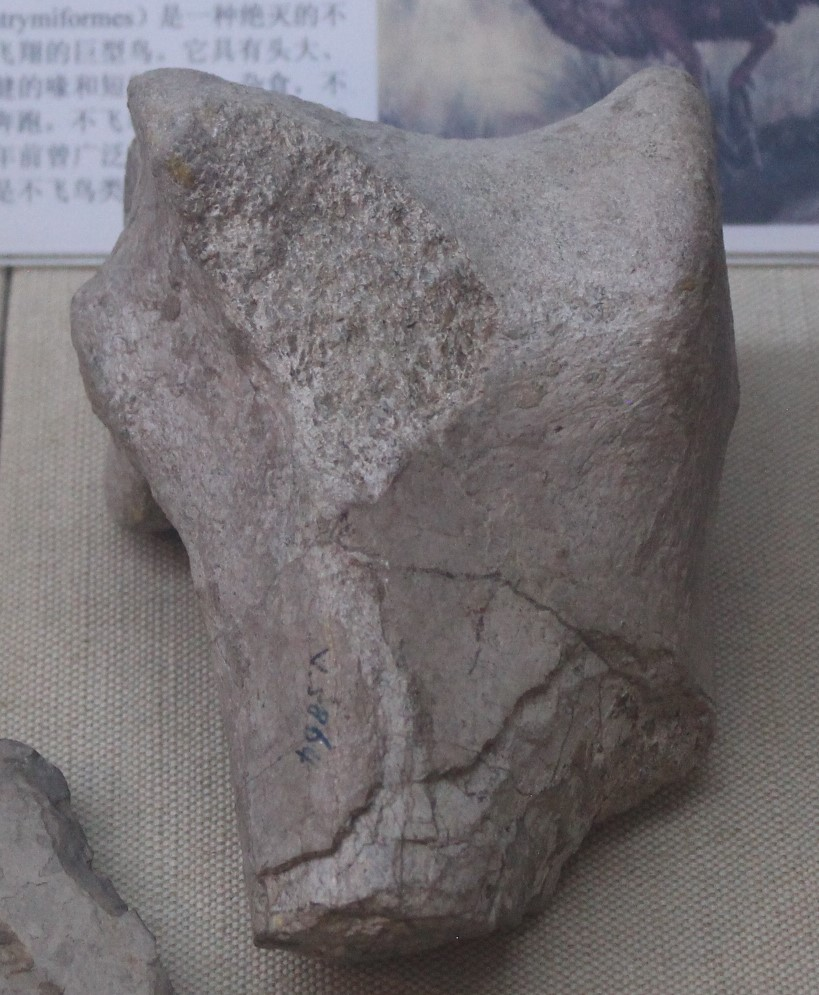
Holotype tibiotarsus (IVPP V5864) of G.? xichuanensis

Gastornis giganteus (Cope, 1876), formerly Diatryma gigantea, dates from the middle Eocene of western North America. Its junior synonyms include Barornis regens (Marsh, 1894) and possibly Omorhamphus storchii (Sinclair, 1928). O. storchii was described based on fossils from lower Eocene rocks of Wyoming. The species was named in honor of T. C. von Storch, who found the fossils remains in Princeton 1927 Expedition. The fossil bones originally described as Omorhamphus storchii are considered to be the remains of a juvenile Gastornis giganteus by Brodkorb (1967), but Louchart et al. (2021) argued that no definitive juvenile specimens of G. giganteus are known and that the two taxa have no known association, so there is no unambiguous evidence to support this synonymy. Specimen YPM PU 13258 from lower Eocene Willwood Formation rocks of Park County, Wyoming also seems to be a juvenile—perhaps also of G. giganteus, in which case it would be an even younger individual.

G. geiselensis, from the middle Eocene of Messel, Germany, has been considered a synonym of G. sarasini; however, other researchers have stated that there is currently insufficient evidence to synonymize the two, and that they should be kept separate at least pending a more detailed comparison of all gastornithids.

In 2024, Gerald Mayr and colleagues argued against the synonymy of Diatryma with Gastornis based on the distinct features of the coracoid and tarsometatarsus of G. giganteus and G. geiselensis, referred to as D. gigantea and D. geiselensis in the paper, when compared to those of G. parisiensis. They further suggested that these two features support the placement of G. sarasini within Diatryma as D. sarasini, and that assigning all species of gastornithiforms to the genus Gastornis would not properly reflect the interrelationships of this taxonomic group. A simplified version of their phylogenetic analysis is reproduced below:

- Gastornithiformes
  - Walbeck gastornithiform
  - Gastornis russelli
  - - Gastornis parisiensis
    - Gastornis laurenti
    - Louvois gastornithiform
    - - London Clay Diatryma
      - Diatryma sarasini
      - Diatryma geiselensis
      - Diatryma gigantea

A tibiotarsus (upper foot bone) originally described in 1980 as Zhongyuanus xichuanensis from the early Eocene of Henan, China, was suggested to be an Asian species of Gastornis in 2013. However, the 2024 study which argued against the synonymy of Diatryma with Gastornis suggested that this fragmentary Chinese taxon cannot be confidently assigned to either Diatryma or Gastornis, and thus more evaluation is required to clarify its taxonomic affinities.

== Paleobiology ==
=== Diet ===
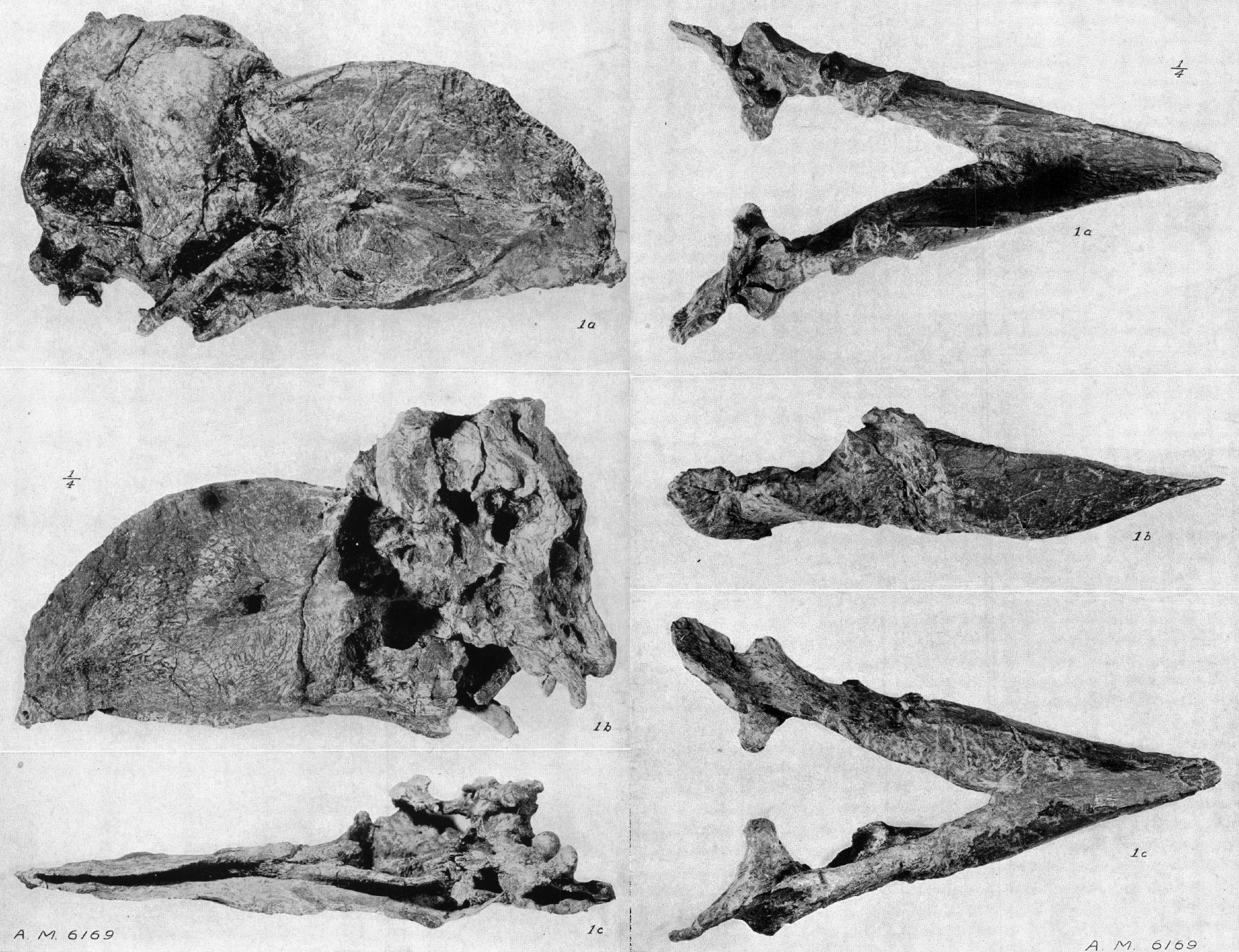
Skull and mandible of G. giganteus specimen AMNH 6169

A long-standing debate surrounding Gastornis is the interpretation of its diet. It has often been depicted as a predator of contemporary small mammals, which famously included the early horse Eohippus. However, with the size of Gastornis legs, the bird would have had to have been more agile to catch fast-moving prey than the fossils suggest it to have been. Consequently, Gastornis has been suspected to have been an ambush hunter and/or used pack hunting techniques to pursue or ambush prey; if Gastornis was a predator, it would have certainly needed some other means of hunting prey through the dense forest. Alternatively, it could have used its strong beak for eating large or strong vegetation.

The skull of Gastornis is massive in comparison to those of living ratites of similar body size. Biomechanical analysis of the skull suggests that the jaw-closing musculature was enormous. The lower jaw is very deep, resulting in a lengthened moment arm of the jaw muscles. Both features strongly suggest that Gastornis could generate a powerful bite. Some scientists have proposed that the skull of Gastornis was 'overbuilt' for a herbivorous diet and support the traditional interpretation of Gastornis as a carnivore that used its powerfully constructed beak to subdue struggling prey and crack open bones to extract marrow. Others have noted the apparent lack of predatory features in the skull, such as a prominently hooked beak, as evidence that Gastornis was a specialized herbivore (or even an omnivore) of some sort, perhaps having used its large beak to crack hard foods like nuts and seeds. Footprints attributed to gastornithids (possibly a species of Gastornis itself), described in 2012, showed that these birds lacked strongly hooked talons on the hind legs, another line of evidence suggesting that they did not have a predatory lifestyle.

Recent evidence suggests that Gastornis was likely a true herbivore. Studies of the calcium isotopes in the bones of specimens of Gastornis by Thomas Tutken and colleagues showed no evidence that it had meat in its diet. The geochemical analysis further revealed that its dietary habits were similar to those of both herbivorous dinosaurs and mammals when it was compared to known fossil carnivores, such as Tyrannosaurus rex, leaving phorusrhacids and bathornithids as the only major carnivorous flightless birds. The first in situ preserved gastroliths in a specimen of G. geiselensis (or D. geiselensis) also conforms to its herbivorous diet.

=== Eggs ===
Shell fragments of huge eggs have turned up in Late Paleocene deposits of Spain and early Eocene deposits of France, namely in Provence. These were described as the ootaxon Ornitholithus and are presumably from Gastornis. While no direct association exists between Ornitholithus and Gastornis fossils, no other birds of sufficient size are known from that time and place; while the large Diogenornis and Eremopezus are known from the Eocene, the former lived in South America (still separated from North America by the Tethys Ocean then) and the latter is only known from the Late Eocene of North Africa, which also was separated by an (albeit less wide) stretch of the Tethys Ocean from Europe.

Some of these fragments were complete enough to reconstruct a size of 24 by 10 cm (about 9.5 by 4 inches) with shells 2.3–2.5 mm (0.09–0.1 in) thick, roughly half again as large as an ostrich egg and very different in shape from the more rounded ratite eggs. If Remiornis is indeed correctly identified as a ratite (which is quite doubtful, however), Gastornis remains as the only known animal that could have laid these eggs. At least one species of Remiornis is known to have been smaller than Gastornis, and was initially described as Gastornis minor by Mlíkovský in 2002. This would nicely match the remains of eggs a bit smaller than those of the living ostrich, which have also been found in Paleogene deposits of Provence, were it not for the fact that these eggshell fossils also date from the Eocene, but no Remiornis bones are yet known from that time.

=== Footprints ===
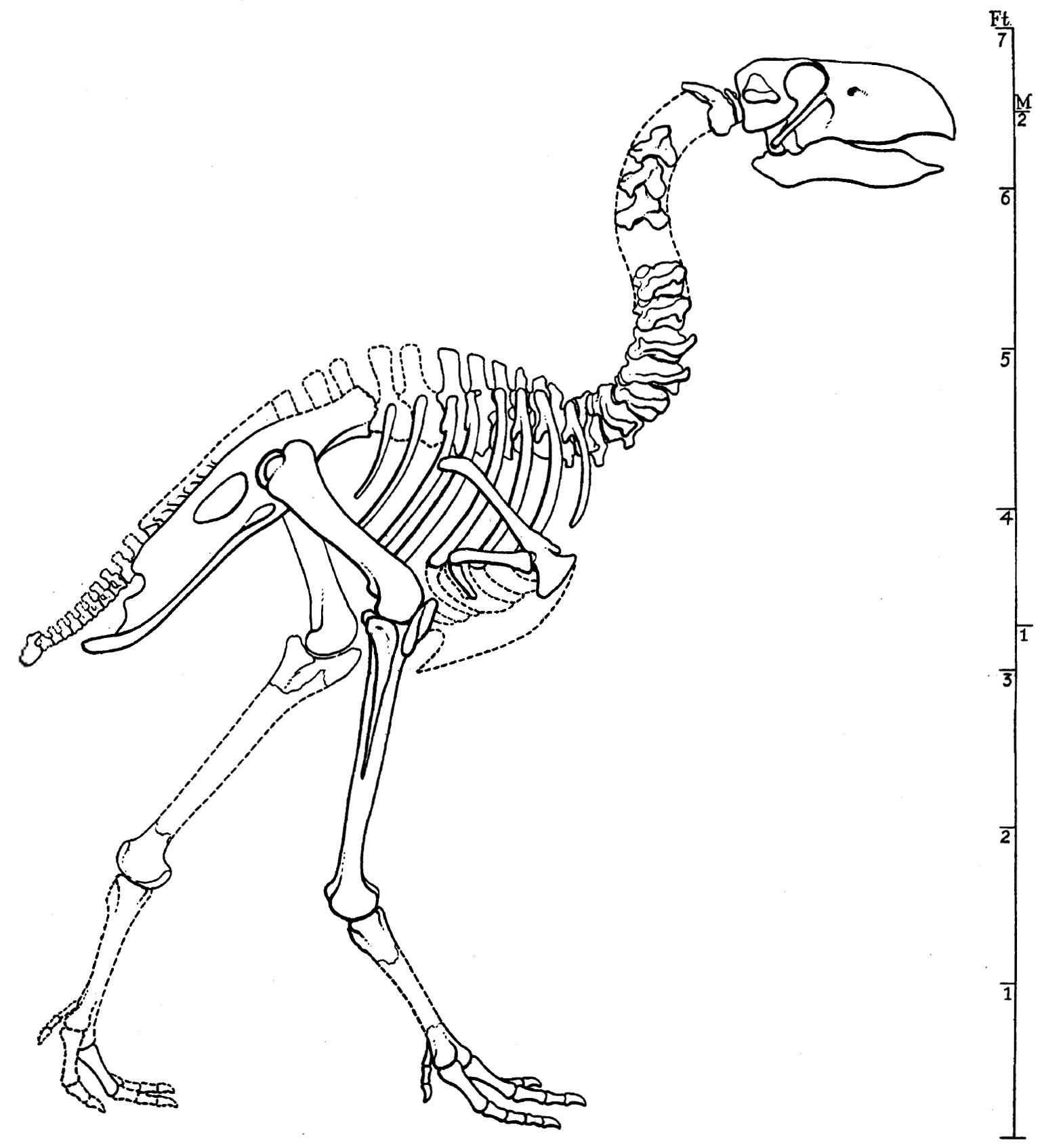
Skeletal restoration of G. giganteus

Several sets of fossil footprints are suspected to belong to Gastornis. One set of footprints was reported from late Eocene gypsum at Montmorency and other locations of the Paris Basin in the 19th century, from 1859 onwards. Described initially by Jules Desnoyers, and later on by Alphonse Milne-Edwards, these trace fossils were celebrated among French geologists of the late 19th century. They were discussed by Charles Lyell in his Elements of Geology as an example of the incompleteness of the fossil record—no bones had been found associated with the footprints. Unfortunately, these fine specimens, which sometimes even preserved details of the skin structure, are now lost. They were brought to the Muséum national d'histoire naturelle when Desnoyers started to work there, and the last documented record of them deals with their presence in the geology exhibition of the MNHN in 1912. The largest of these footprints, although only consisting of a single toe's impression, was 40 cm (16 in) long. The large footprints from the Paris Basin could also be divided into huge and merely large examples, much like the eggshells from southern France, which are 20 million years older.

Another footprint record consists of a single imprint that still exists, though it has proven to be even more controversial. It was found in late Eocene Puget Group rocks in the Green River valley near Black Diamond, Washington. After its discovery, it raised considerable interest in the Seattle area in May–July 1992, being subject of at least two longer articles in The Seattle Times. Variously declared a hoax or genuine, this apparent impression of a single bird foot measures about 27 cm (11 in) wide by 32 cm (13 in) long and lacks a hallux (hind toe); it was described as the ichnotaxon Ornithoformipes controversus. Fourteen years after the initial discovery, the debate about the find's authenticity was still unresolved. The specimen is now at Western Washington University.

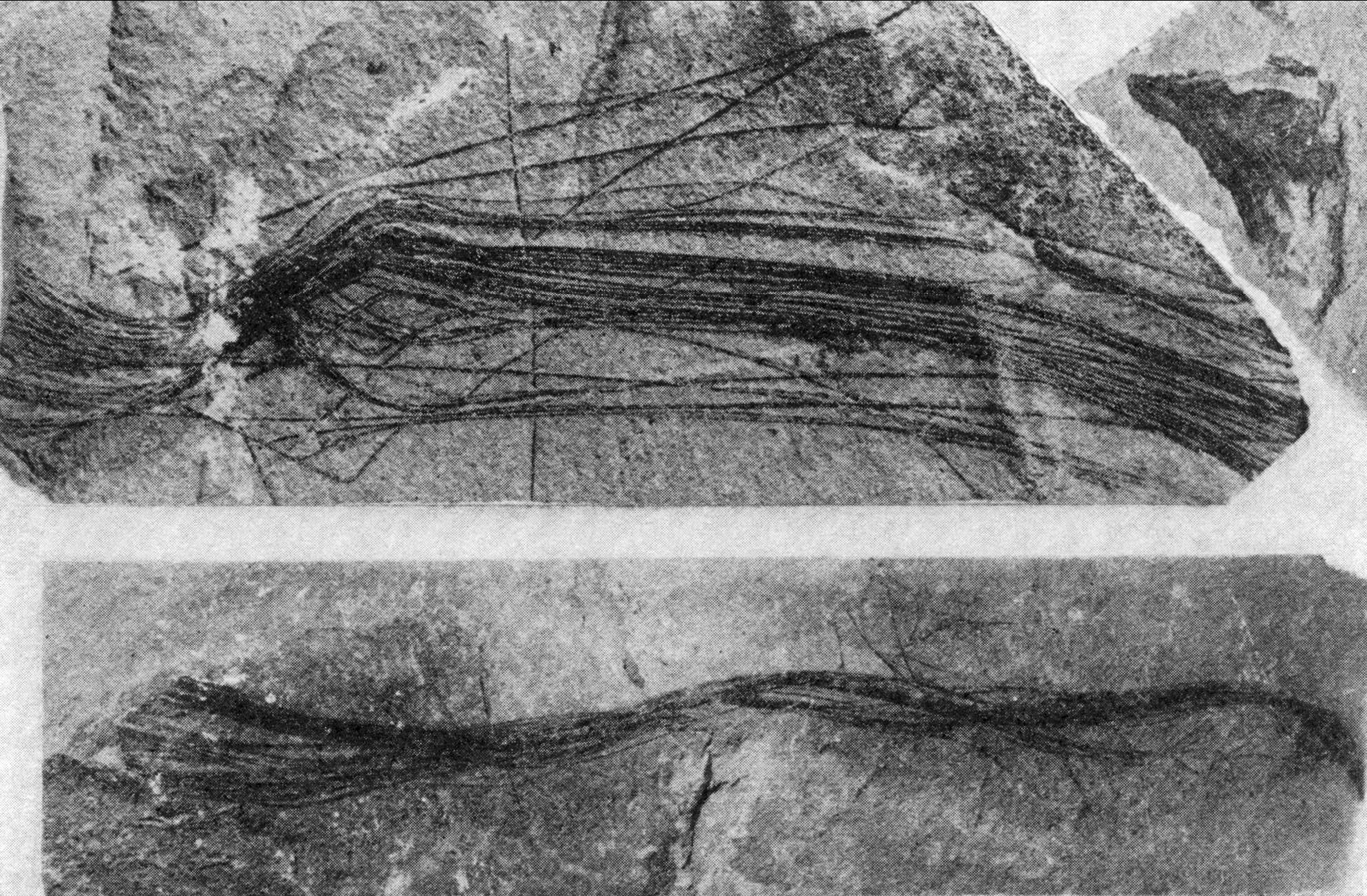
Supposed Gastornis feathers, which turned out to be plant material

The problem with these early trace fossils is that no fossil of Gastornis has been found to be younger than about 45 million years. In North America, the fossil record of unequivocal gastornithids seems to end even earlier than in Europe. However, in 2009, a landslide near Bellingham, Washington exposed at least 18 tracks on 15 blocks in the Eocene Chuckanut Formation. The anatomy and age (about 53.7 Ma old) of the tracks suggest that the track maker was Gastornis. Although these birds have long been considered to be predators or scavengers, the absence of raptor-like claws supports earlier suggestions that they were herbivores. The Chuckanut tracks are named as the ichnotaxon Rivavipes giganteus, inferred to belong to the extinct family Gastornithidae. At least ten of the tracks are on display at Western Washington University.

=== Feathers ===
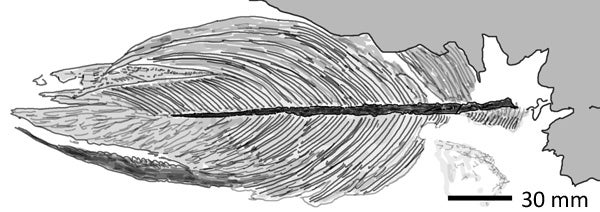
Drawing of probable Gastornis feather from the Green River Formation. By Darren Naish

The plumage of Gastornis has generally been depicted in art as a hair-like covering similar to some ratites. This has been based in part on some fibrous strands recovered from a Green River Formation deposit at Roan Creek, Colorado, which were initially believed to represent Gastornis feathers and named Diatryma? filifera. Subsequent examination has shown the fossil material to not actually be feathers, but root fibers and the species renamed as Cyperacites filiferus.

A second possible Gastornis feather has since been identified, also from the Green River Formation. Unlike the filamentous plant material, this single isolated feather resembles the body feathers of flighted birds, being broad and vaned. It was tentatively identified as a possible Gastornis feather based on its size; the feather measured 240 mm (9.4 in) long and must have belonged to a gigantic bird.

== Distribution ==
It has been argued that Gastornis has a Holarctic distribution with fossils found in western Europe, North America (including an indeterminate specimen identified as Gastornis sp. from Arctic Canada), and possibly central China. The earliest (Paleocene) fossils all come from Europe, and it is likely that the genus originated there. Europe in this epoch was an island continent, and Gastornis was the largest terrestrial tetrapod of the landmass. This offers parallels with the Malagasy elephant birds, herbivorous birds that were similarly the largest land animals in the isolated landmass of Madagascar, in spite of otherwise mammalian megafauna.

All other fossil remains are from the Eocene, though it is currently unknown how the genus Gastornis dispersed out of Europe and into other continents, and whether such assertion is even true given the potential validity of Diatryma. Given the possible presence of Gastornis fossils in the early Eocene of western China, these birds may have spread east from Europe and crossed into North America via the Bering land bridge. Gastornis also may have spread both east and west, arriving separately in eastern Asia and in North America across the Turgai Strait. Direct landbridges with North America are also known. European Gastornis survived somewhat longer than their North American counterparts, which seems to coincide with a period of increased isolation of the continent.

== Extinction ==
The reason for the extinction of Gastornis is currently unclear. Competition with mammals has often been cited as a possible factor, but in Asia and North America Gastornis occurred in faunas dominated by mammalian megafaunal herbivores like pantodonts. Likewise, extreme climatic events like the Paleocene–Eocene thermal maximum (PETM) appear to have had little impact. Nonetheless, the extended survival in Europe is thought to coincide with increased isolation of the landmass.
