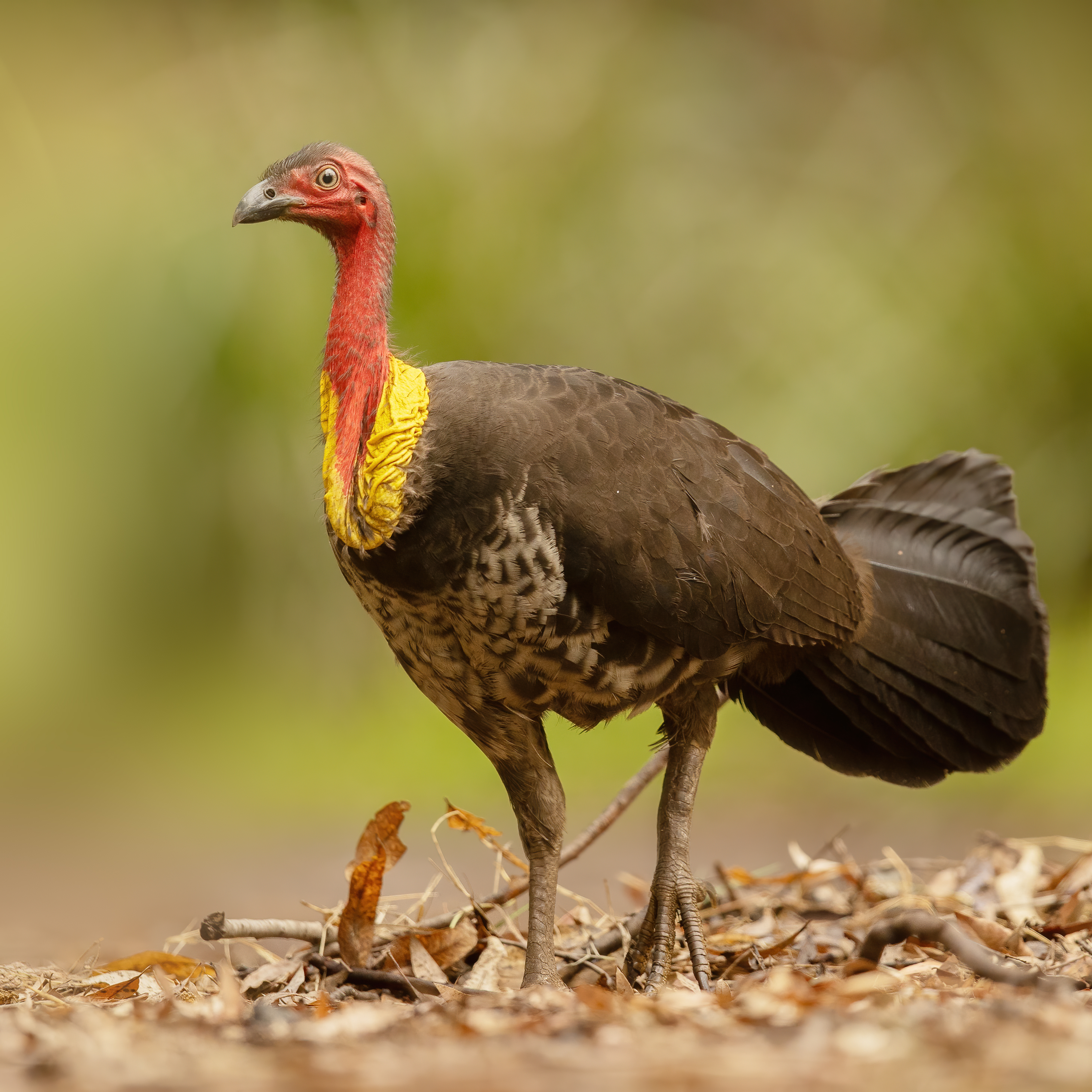
- Australian brushturkey (Alectura lathami)

Scientific classification
- Domain: Eukaryota
- Kingdom: Animalia
- Phylum: Chordata
- Class: Aves
- Infraclass: Neognathae
- Clade: Pangalloanserae; Gauthier and de Queiroz, 2001

Subgroups
- †Asteriornis; Galloanserae; Odontoanserae; Pangalliformes

Synonyms
- Pananatophasianae

= Pangalloanserae =

Pangalloanserae Temporal range: Maastrichtian–Recent Possibly an earlier origin based on molecular clock

Clade of birds

Pangalloanserae is a clade of birds defined in a 2001 study by Jacques Gauthier and Kevin de Queiroz as "most inclusive clade containing Galloanserae but not Neoaves". It contains crown Galloanserae as well as all stem-galloanserans.
