= Asteriornis =

Asteriornis Temporal range: Late Maastrichtian 66.8–66.7 Ma
- Skull in lateral view

Scientific classification
- Kingdom: Animalia
- Phylum: Chordata
- Class: Aves
- Infraclass: Neognathae
- Clade: Pangalloanserae
- Genus: †Asteriornis; Field et al. 2020

Type species
- †Asteriornis maastrichtensis Field et al. 2020

Fossil bird genus from Belgium

Asteriornis ("Asteria's bird") is an extinct genus of bird from the Late Cretaceous of Belgium which is known from a single species, Asteriornis maastrichtensis. It was a small, long-legged bird that lived near the coastline and co-existed with more "primitive" types of birds such as Ichthyornis. Asteriornis is one of the oldest-known birds irrefutably belonging to the group Neornithes, which encompasses all modern birds, and is possibly closely related to birds of the extant superorder Galloanserae such as chickens and ducks. It possesses characteristics of both galliformes (chicken-like birds) and anseriformes (duck-like birds), indicating its position as a close relative of the last common ancestor for both groups.

Asteriornis may shed light on why Neornithes were the only dinosaurs to survive the Cretaceous–Paleogene extinction event. Its coexistence with non-neornithean birds such as Ichthyornis implies that competition was not a primary factor for the extinction of non-neornitheans, which resembled modern birds in most respects but died out with other non-avian dinosaurs. Small size, a terrestrial lifestyle, and a generalist diet have all been inferred as ecological advantages possessed by early neornithes, allowing them to survive and diversify in the wake of the extinction. Asteriornis fulfills these qualities, suggesting that such suspicions were justified. Asteriornis is also evidence against a different hypothesis stating that modern birds originated from southern continents. This was supported by biogeographic ancestral reconstructions using phylogenies and the discovery of Vegavis (a possible neornithean from Antarctica), but Asteriornis's presence in Europe suggests that modern birds may have been widespread in northern continents in their early evolution.

== Discovery and naming ==
Asteriornis is based on specimen NHMM 2013 008, held in the Maastricht Natural History Museum (Dutch: Natuurhistorisch Museum Maastricht), which consists of an almost complete skull and fragments of leg bones and a radius. It was retrieved from four blocks of sediment found at the CBR-Romontbos quarry near Eben-Emael in the Maastricht Formation of Belgium, and was first unearthed in 2000, by amateur paleontologist Maarten van Dinther, who donated it to the museum. This geological formation is the namesake of the Maastrichtian stage, which was the last stage of the Cretaceous period and the Mesozoic era. It is dated to around 66.8 to 66.7 million years old, less than a million years before the arrival of the asteroid that caused the Cretaceous–Paleogene extinction event, killed off all non-avian dinosaurs (and many other animals), and began the Cenozoic era.

The genus name, Asteriornis, was constructed from ornis, the Greek word for bird, and from Asteria, a Greek goddess who was associated with falling stars, and about whom there is a famous myth in which she transforms herself into a quail. The Asteri part of the genus name thus alludes to the Chicxulub impactor (a "falling star"), and also alludes to quails which are members of the galloanserans. The species name A. maastrichtensis is named after the Maastricht Formation. The researchers who discovered and described the fossil gave Asteriornis the nickname "Wonderchicken", which was picked up by various news outlets.

== Description ==
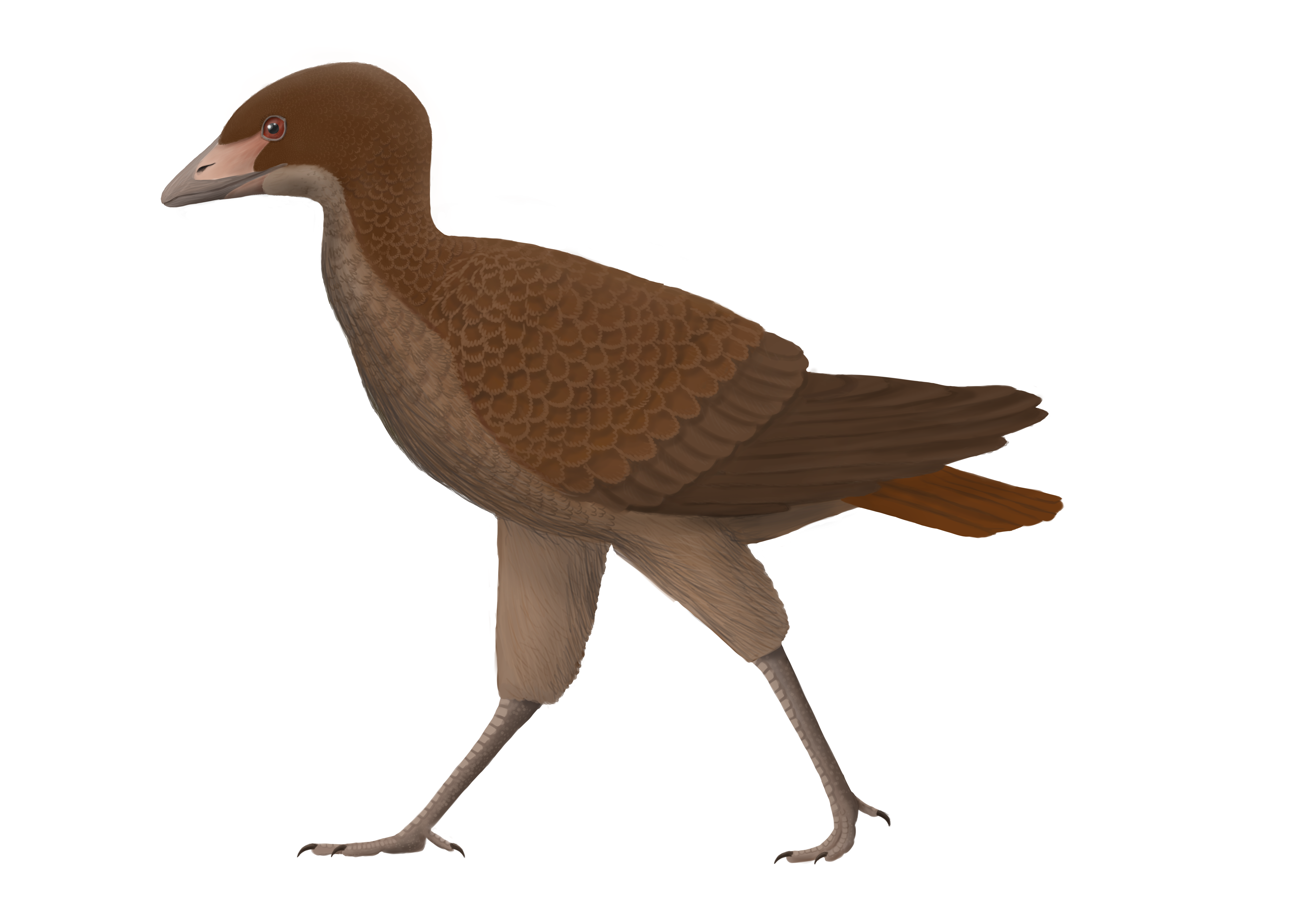
Life restoration

The holotype of Asteriornis is estimated around 394 grams [13.9 oz], and likely reached skeletal maturity or was close to it before death.

The beak was slightly downcurved and lightweight. Unlike galloanserans, the beak did not have any specialized connections to the rest of the skull, nor a hooked tip. Instead its front tip was slightly rounded. The skull was narrowest over the orbits (eye sockets), where the frontal bones were incised by a V-shaped part of the nasal bones. The bones forming the jaw joint were very galloanseran-like. The quadrate bone (the cranium's contribution to the jaw joint) connected to the skull roof via two pronounced knobs, which were adjacent to a third smaller knob, the tuberculum subcapitulare. The mandible (lower jaw) connected to the quadrate with a pair of sockets, and the rear end of the lower jaw had a large hooked rearward-facing retroarticular process of the jaw as well as a smaller inward-facing medial process. All of these characteristics are considered unique to (or at least most common in) galloanserans. However, Crane et al. (2025) were unable to confirm the putative galloanseran-like retroarticular process based on their re-examination of the mandible.

In some respects the skull seems more similar to galliform birds such as chickens and pheasants. These include unfused snout bones and nasal bones which fork in front of the eyes. In other respects it resembles anseriform birds such as ducks and geese. Such features include the postorbital process (the portion of bone forming the rear edge of the eye socket) which curves forward at its lower extent. These demonstrate a principle of evolution that animals close to the common ancestor of two groups share some similarities with each group.

The radius fragment flattens and widens towards the wrist, where it possesses a large hooked bump. Leg bones are elongated and slender, similar in proportions and structure to modern ground-living birds. The femur has well-developed muscle ridges and a large, angular medial condyle. The tibiotarsus is widest towards the knee, while the tarsometatarsus is thinner and covered with ridges.

== Classification ==
A phylogenetic analysis placed Asteriornis near the base of Galloanserae, an expansive superorder containing birds such as chickens, ducks, pheasants, and other types of fowl and gamebirds. The precise placement varied based on whether the analysis used parsimony or Bayesian protocol. Parsimony placed it as the sister taxon to Galloanserae, meaning that it was a distant relative of the last common ancestor of chickens and ducks. Bayesian protocol instead placed it within Galloanserae, specifically as the sister taxon to Galliformes. This means that it was more closely related to chickens than to ducks, but also that was not a direct ancestor of modern chicken-like birds.

Classifying Asteriornis as a relative of chickens and ducks means that it is unequivocally a neornithean. This is important because Neornithes originated at the last common ancestor of all living birds, and corresponds to the term "bird" as it refers to modern-day animals. Pre-neornithean birds such as Ichthyornis, enantiornitheans, or Archaeopteryx generally resemble modern birds but retain primitive features such as teeth or wing claws. Neornithean fossils are extremely rare from the Mesozoic age, and are generally fragmentary or poorly described. One of the oldest known neognath, specifically a stem-anseriform, is the presbyornithid Teviornis from the Nemegt Formation of Mongolia around 70 million years ago. The taxonomic identity of Vegavis from the Late Cretaceous (~69.2–68.4 Ma) of Antarctica was debated among paleontologists until a nearly complete skull was described in 2025, which confirmed its identity as a crown group anseriform. Asteriornis is based on diagnostic and well-preserved skull material and its status is less unstable, so it can be considered among the oldest known undisputed fossil of a modern-style neornithean bird.

At least two studies in 2021 and 2024 recovered Asteriornis as a paleognath, sister to Lithornithidae and Tinamidae, albeit "with limited support". Other researchers still support Asterornis as a neornithean closely related to or within Galloanserae based on morphometric and phylogenetic analyses. In February 2025, the phylogenetic analyses by Torres and colleagues recovered Asteriornis within Neognathae, a sister taxon of Palaeognathae, or as a sister taxon of Galliformes. In June 2025, Crane and colleagues placed Asteriornis within the crown-group Galloanserae based on their phylogenetic analyses, specifically as a stem-galliform, though the authors were unable to find a galloanseran-like retroarticular process unlike previously assumed. In December 2025, Crane and colleagues further supported this position based on the unambiguous galloanseran-like feature found in the rostral surface of the quadrate bone.

== See also ==
- List of bird species described in the 2020s
