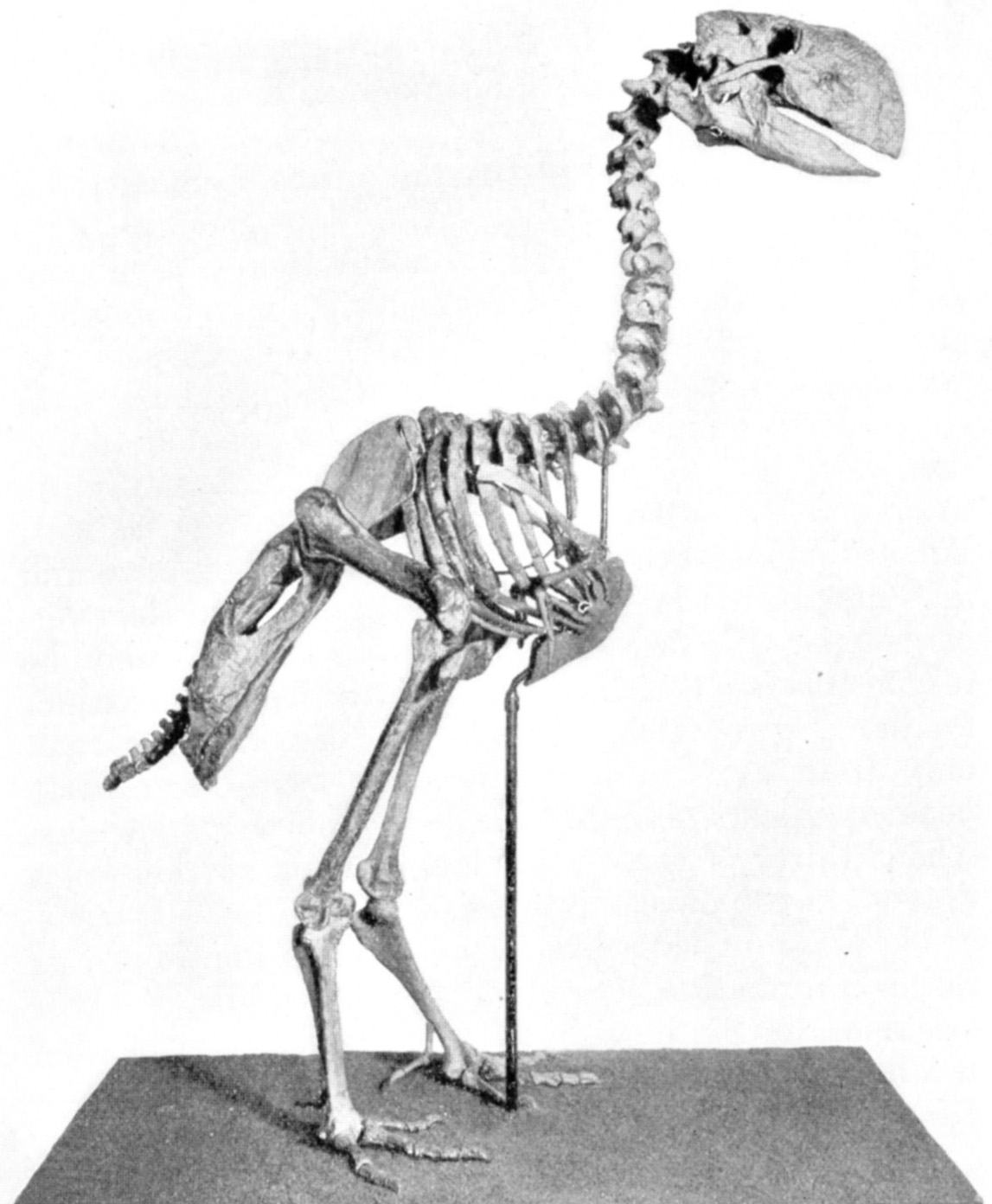

Scientific classification
- Kingdom: Animalia
- Phylum: Chordata
- Class: Aves
- Superorder: Galloanserae
- Order: †Gastornithiformes; Stejneger, 1885

Subgroups
- †Gastornithidae; ?†Brontornis; ?†Dromornithidae; ?†Sylviornithidae

= Gastornithiformes =

Gastornithiformes Temporal range: Middle Paleocene - middle Eocene Possible Neogene and Pleistocene records

Extinct order of birds

Gastornithiformes are an extinct order of giant flightless fowl with fossils found in North America, Eurasia, and possibly Australia and Argentina.

Members of Gastornithidae were long considered to be a part of the order Gruiformes. However, the traditional concept of Gruiformes has since been shown to be polyphyletic.

Beginning in the late 1980s and the first phylogenetic analysis of gastornithid relationships, consensus began to grow that they were close relatives of the lineage that includes waterfowl and screamers, the Anseriformes. Recognizing the apparent close relationship between gastornithids and waterfowl, some researchers even classified them within Anseriformes. While the order Gastornithiformes is generally considered to include one family, Gastornithidae, a 2017 study concerning the evolution and phylogeny of giant fowl by Worthy and colleagues found phylogenetic support for a close relationship between the Dromornithidae and Gastornithidae.

The dromornithids are another family of giant flightless birds that have been classified either as crown group anseriforms closely related to the screamers (Anhimidae) or the sister taxon to Anseriformes. Worthy et al. (2017) did note that their findings were weakly supported and one of their phylogenies even found a similarly weakly supported branch including gastornithids and dromornithids to be stem-galliforms instead. Below is simplification of their parsimony-based phylogeny supporting gastornithiforms as anserimorphs.

- Anserimorphae
  - Anseriformes (waterfowl)
  - - †Vegaviiformes
    - Gastornithiformes
      - †Gastornithidae
      - †Dromornithidae (mihirungs)

In a 2021 paper by Agnolin found the enigmatic Argentinian genus Brontornis from the Miocene deposits, often considered to be a terror bird, to be the sister taxon to the dromornithids, in a clade that was sister to species of Gastornis.

Subsequent phylogenetic analyses by McInerney et al. (2024), using an updated dataset with a focus on skull characters, resolved dromornithids as crown group members of Anseriformes closely related to modern screamers, while gastornithids were resolved as members of the Galliformes. They also found weak support for the Sylviornithidae (another enigmatic family of giant birds from Oceania that went extinct during the Quaternary) potentially being a sister group to Gastornithidae. The lineage containing these two families was found to either represent a group of stem-Galliformes, or a group of crown group Galliformes sister to Phasianoidea.
