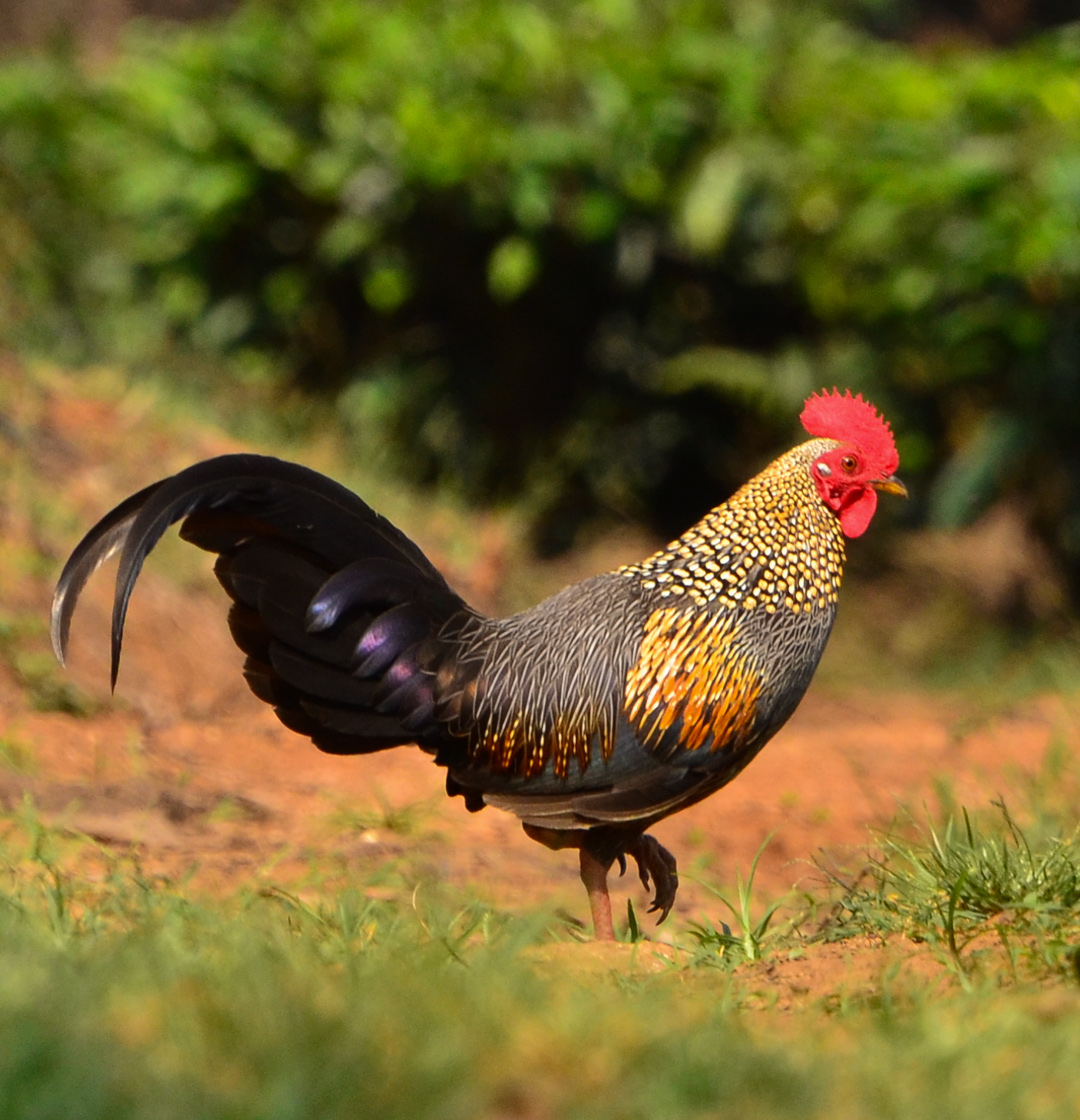
- Male grey junglefowl, Gallus sonneratii

Scientific classification
- Kingdom: Animalia
- Phylum: Chordata
- Class: Aves
- Superorder: Galloanserae
- Clade: Pangalliformes; Clarke, 2004

Subgroups
- †Gallinuloididae; †Paraortygidae; †Quercymegapodiidae; †Sylviornithidae; ?†Dromornithidae; ?†Gastornithiformes; Galliformes

Synonyms
- Panphasianiformes; Gallimorphae; Phasianimorphae

= Pangalliformes =

Pangalliformes Temporal range: Paleogene–Recent

Clade of birds

Pangalliformes is the scientific name of a provisional clade of birds within the group Galloanserae. It is defined as all birds more closely related to chickens than to ducks, and includes all modern chickens, turkeys, pheasants, and megapodes, as well as extinct species that do not fall within the crown group Galliformes.

== Classification ==
Galliform-like pangalliformes are represented by extinct families from the Paleogene, namely the Gallinuloididae, Paraortygidae and Quercymegapodiidae. In the early Cenozoic, some additional birds may or may not be early Galliformes, though even if they are, it is rather unlikely that these belong to extant families:

- †Argillipes (London Clay Early Eocene of England)
- †Coturnipes (Early Eocene of England, and Virginia, USA?)
- †Paleophasianus (Willwood Early Eocene of Bighorn County, USA)
- †Percolinus (London Clay Early Eocenee of England)
- †"Palaeorallus" alienus (middle Oligocene of Tatal-Gol, Mongolia)
- †Anisolornis (Santa Cruz Middle Miocene of Karaihen, Argentina)

More recently, Sylviornis and its sister taxon Megavitiornis was considered as stem-galliforms, suggesting that at least one lineage of Pangalliformes outside the crown group Galliformes survived to the Holocene. This same study also presents Dromornithidae as possibly closer to Galliformes than to Anseriformes as traditionally expected, though it acknowledges that more work is required for confirmation. A 2024 study alternatively classified dromornithids as crown anseriforms and suggested that Gastornithiformes and sylviornithids are crown-group galliforms.

=== Putative Late Cretaceous records ===
A few fragmentary fossils have been described as pangalliforms from the Late Cretaceous. Asteriornis, one of the earliest known pangalloanserine birds, likely belongs to the pangalliforms. Austinornis lentus (formerly referred to as Ichthyornis lentus, Graculavus lentus, or Pedioecetes lentus) was found in the Late Cretaceous Austin Chalk near Fort McKinney, Texas. In 2004, Clarke classified it within Pangalliformes rather than true Galliformes, pending further fossil finds. However, other researchers have disputed its classification and dismissed it in phylogenetic analyses due to the fragmentary nature of the holotype. Notably, in 2014, Gerald Mayr suggested that Austinornis is a non-neornithine from the Coniacian or Santonian age and that the specimen probably belongs to the ornithurine Apatornis or Iaceornis.

Another specimen, PVPH 237, from the Late Cretaceous Portezuelo Formation (Turonian-Coniacian, about 90 Ma) in the Sierra de Portezuelo (Argentina) has also been suggested to be an early relative of true galliformes, though the study did not specifically classified the specimen as a pangalliform. This is a partial coracoid of a possible neornithine bird, which in its general shape and particularly the wide and deep attachment for the muscle joining the coracoid and the humerus bone resembles the more basal lineages of galliforms.
