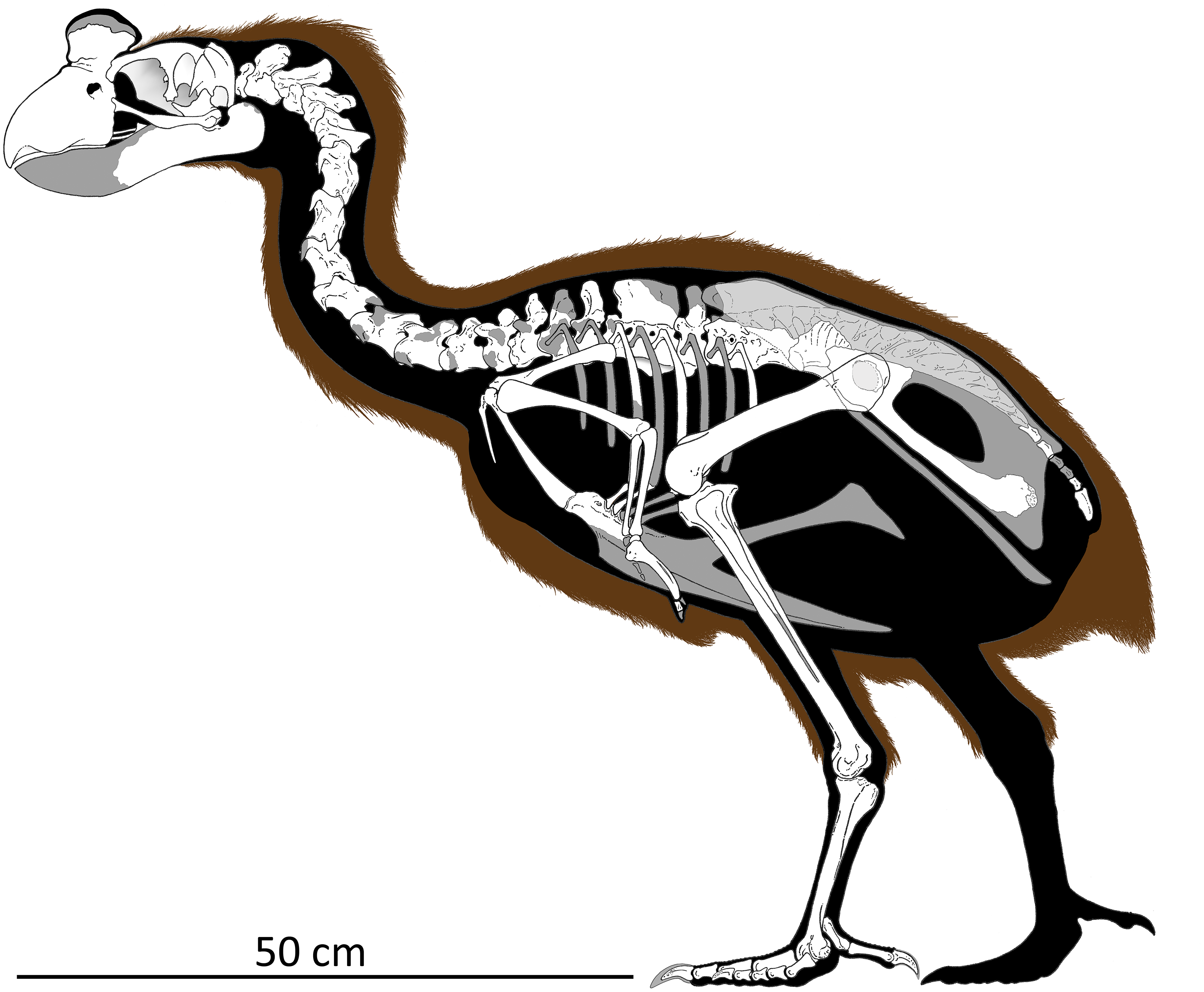
- Skeletal reconstruction, with known bones in white

Scientific classification
- Kingdom: Animalia
- Phylum: Chordata
- Class: Aves
- Family: †Sylviornithidae
- Genus: †Sylviornis; Poplin, 1980
- Species: †S. neocaledoniae

Binomial name
- †Sylviornis neocaledoniae Poplin, 1980

= Sylviornis =

Sylviornis Temporal range: Holocene

Extinct genus of birds

Sylviornis is an extinct genus of large, flightless bird that was endemic to the islands of New Caledonia in the Western Pacific. It is considered to constitute one of two genera in the extinct family Sylviornithidae, alongside Megavitiornis from Fiji, which are related to the Galliformes, the group containing the turkeys, chickens, quails and pheasants. Sylviornis was never encountered alive by scientists, but it is known from many thousands of subfossil bones found in deposits, some of them from the Holocene, on New Caledonia and the adjacent Île des Pins. It was likely hunted to extinction, shortly after the first human arrival to New Caledonia around 1500 BC.

== Description ==
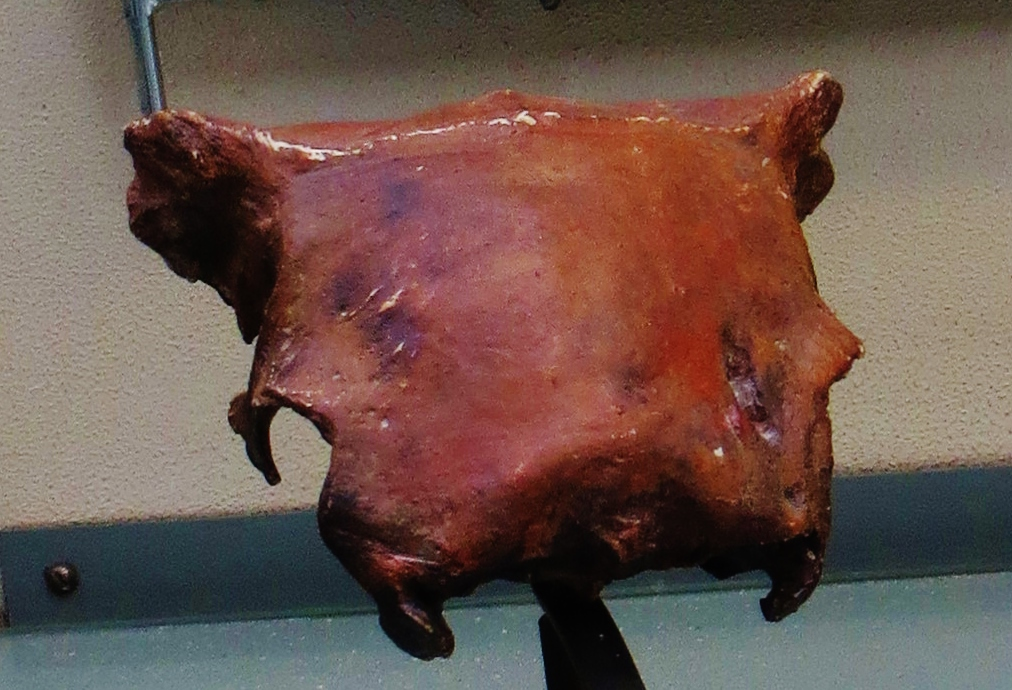
Skull

Size of Sylviornis compared to a human

Sylviornis was a huge flightless bird, around 80 centimetres (31 in) tall, and weighing around 27–34 kg (60–75 lb). It is the most massive pangalliform known to have ever existed. It had a large skull with a high and laterally compressed beak surmounted by a bony knob. Its legs were rather short, but had strong toes with long nails. The skeleton has a number of peculiarities and differences that make Sylviornis stand apart from all other known birds: the clavicles were not fused to a furcula, the number of caudal vertebrae was very high, and the ribcage and pelvis were almost dinosaurian in appearance. The wings were reduced to small stubs.

Native accounts believed to be based on Sylviornis describe a bird reddish in color, with a star-shaped calque on its head, and fast despite being flightless because it used its reduced wings for balance while running.

== Behaviour and ecology ==
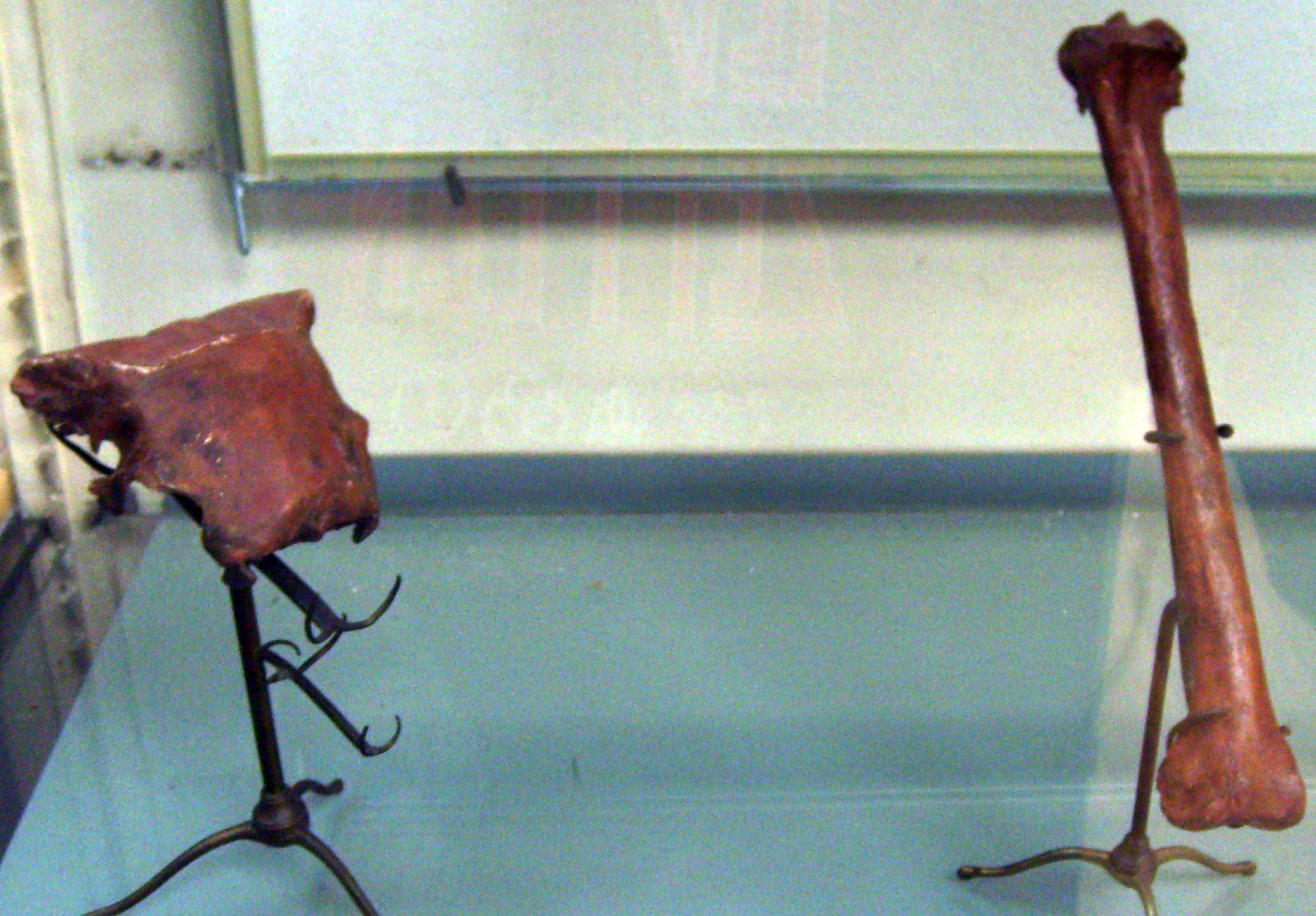
Sylviornis neocaledoniae skull fragment and tibia, Muséum national d'histoire naturelle, Paris

The anatomy of its skull suggests that it had a reduced optic lobes, with a well developed sense of smell and somatosensorial system, adapted for being active during twilight conditions (crepuscular) in search of food. The diet is unknown. Because of its beak morphology and chicken-like feet, some authors guessed that the species was a herbivore that fed on low vegetation and dug up roots and tubers, but others that it was a specialized invertebrate predator.

A large proportion—up to 50% in some deposits—of the remains found were from juvenile animals. Thus, it has been theorized that Sylviornis had a clutch of at least two, more probably closer to 10 eggs, and that the average lifespan was not much more than 5–7 years, which would be extremely low for such a large bird. It was thought that the bird did not incubate its eggs but built a mound similar to the megapodes. Tumuli on the Île des Pins which were initially believed to be graves were found to contain no human remains or grave goods, and it has been hypothesized that they were the incubation mounds of Sylviornis. As these mounds are up to 5 m (16 ft) high and 50 m (160 ft) wide even after nearly four millennia, they seem too large to have been made by the giant scrubfowl (Megapodius molistructor), an extinct New Caledonian species of megapode. However, recent assessment of this bird as outside and not even particularly closely related to megapodes make the possibility that it was a mound-builder like them strictly unlikely.

In native accounts, the bird only laid one egg between November and April that was not incubated, covered, or protected in any way. However, the adults were aggressive.

== Extinction ==
Sylviornis is the most common fossil animal in New Caledonia and its remains are often found in human contexts. The bird was likely hunted to extinction by the Lapita ancestors of the Kanak people, who settled New Caledonia around 1500 BCE. The most recent evidence of the species is a bone from the Pindai Caves carbon dated to 1120–840 BCE. If native accounts about its breeding habits are accurate, the eggs and hatchlings would also be vulnerable to introduced mammalian predators.

== See also ==
- Biodiversity of New Caledonia
- Holocene extinction
- Island gigantism
- Late Quaternary prehistoric birds
- Dodo
