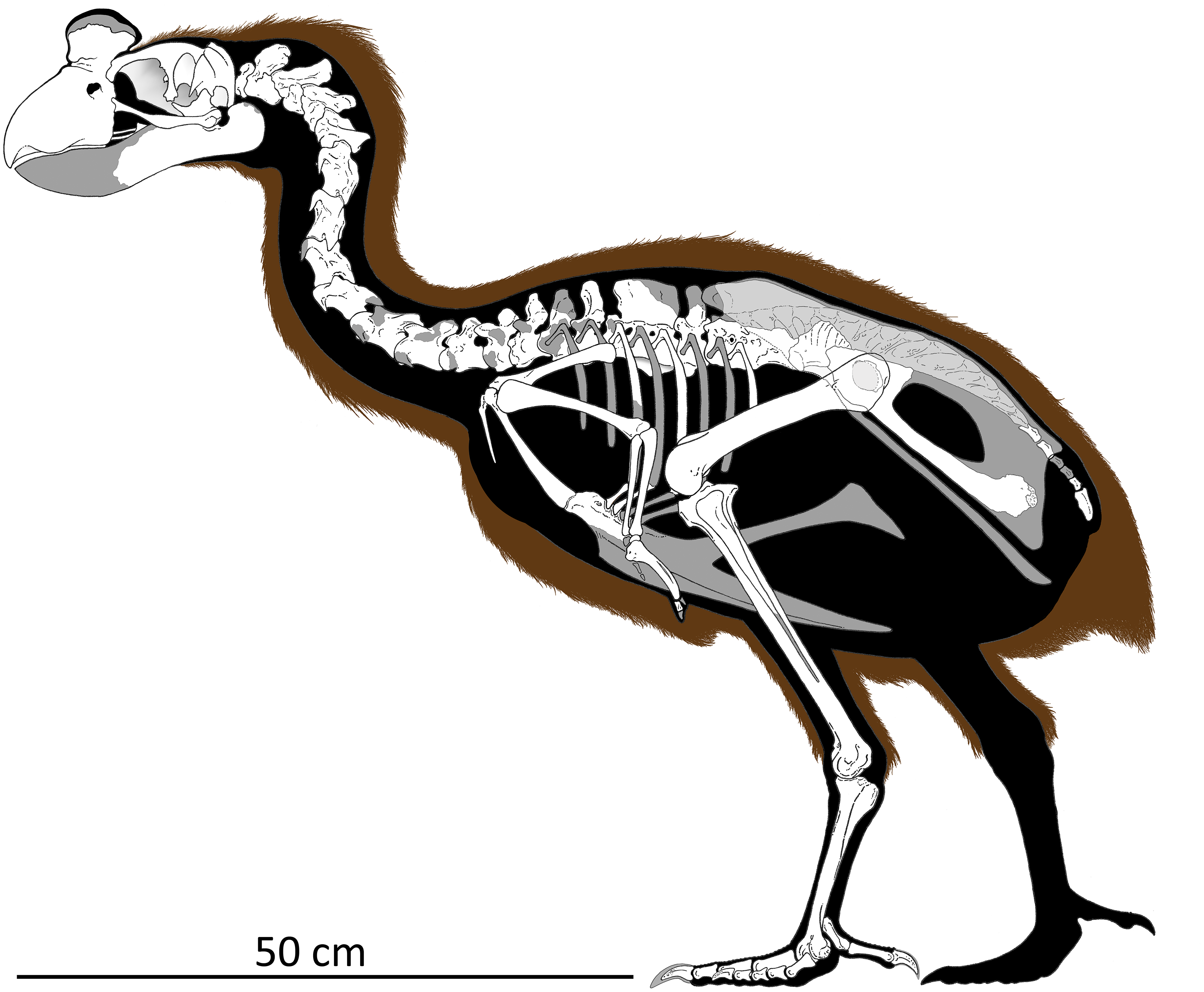
- Skeletal reconstruction of Sylviornis

Scientific classification
- Domain: Eukaryota
- Kingdom: Animalia
- Phylum: Chordata
- Class: Aves
- Clade: Pangalliformes
- Family: †Sylviornithidae; Mourer-Chauviré & Balouet, 2005

Genera
- †Megavitiornis; †Sylviornis

= Sylviornithidae =

Sylviornithidae Temporal range: Holocene

Extinct family of birds

Sylviornithidae is an extinct family of flightless birds, known from subfossil bones found in Holocene aged deposits on the Melanesian islands of New Caledonia and Fiji. For many years it was considered a monotypic family consisting of the New Calendonia Sylviornis alone, but recent studies show that the Fijian Megavitiornis was part of this clade as well. Long considered to have galliform affinities, a 2016 study suggested that they were outside the Galliformes crown group, while a 2024 study suggested that they were members of the Galliformes crown group as more closely related to Phasianoidea than to Megapodiidae, and were most closely related to the extinct giant gastornithids.
