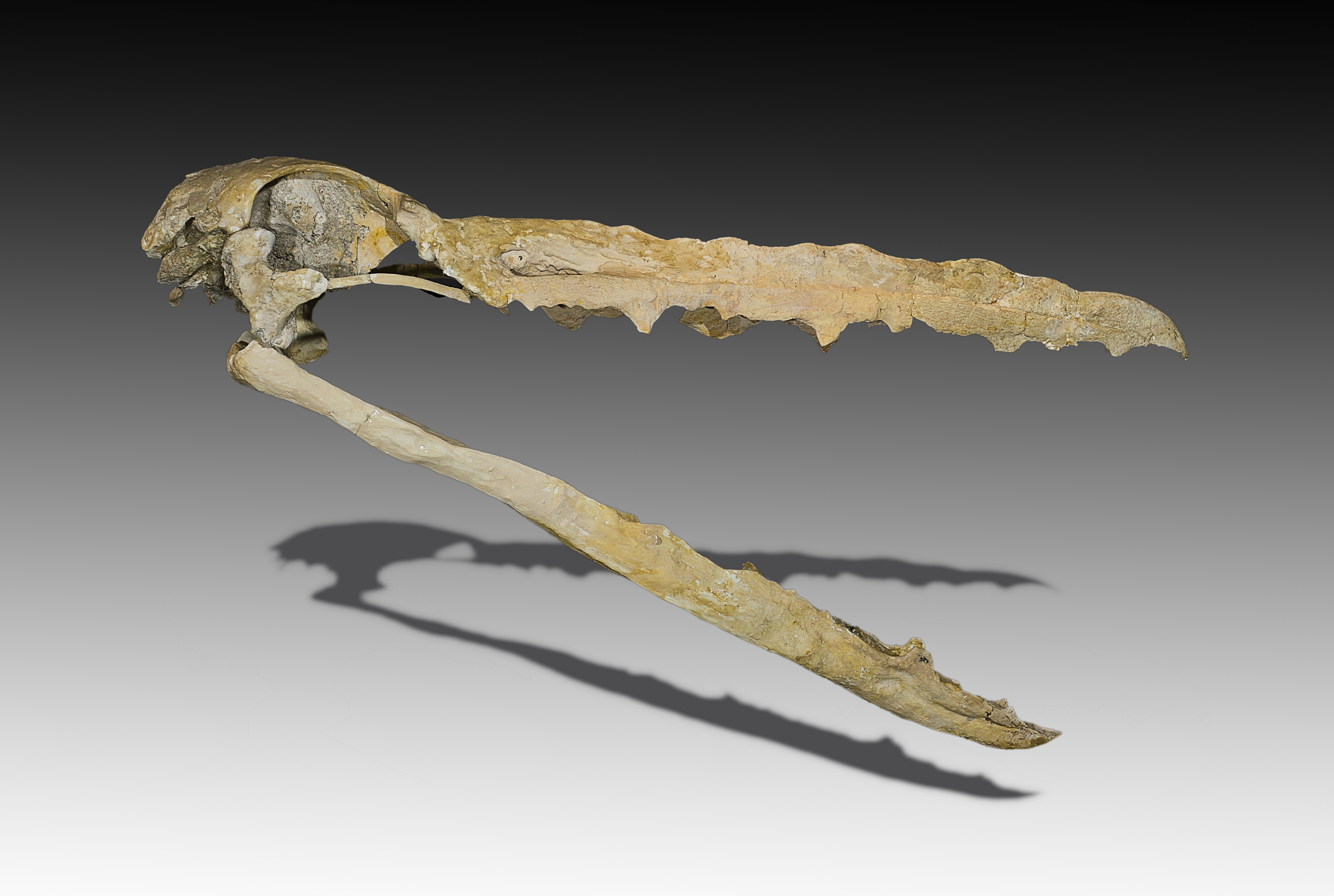

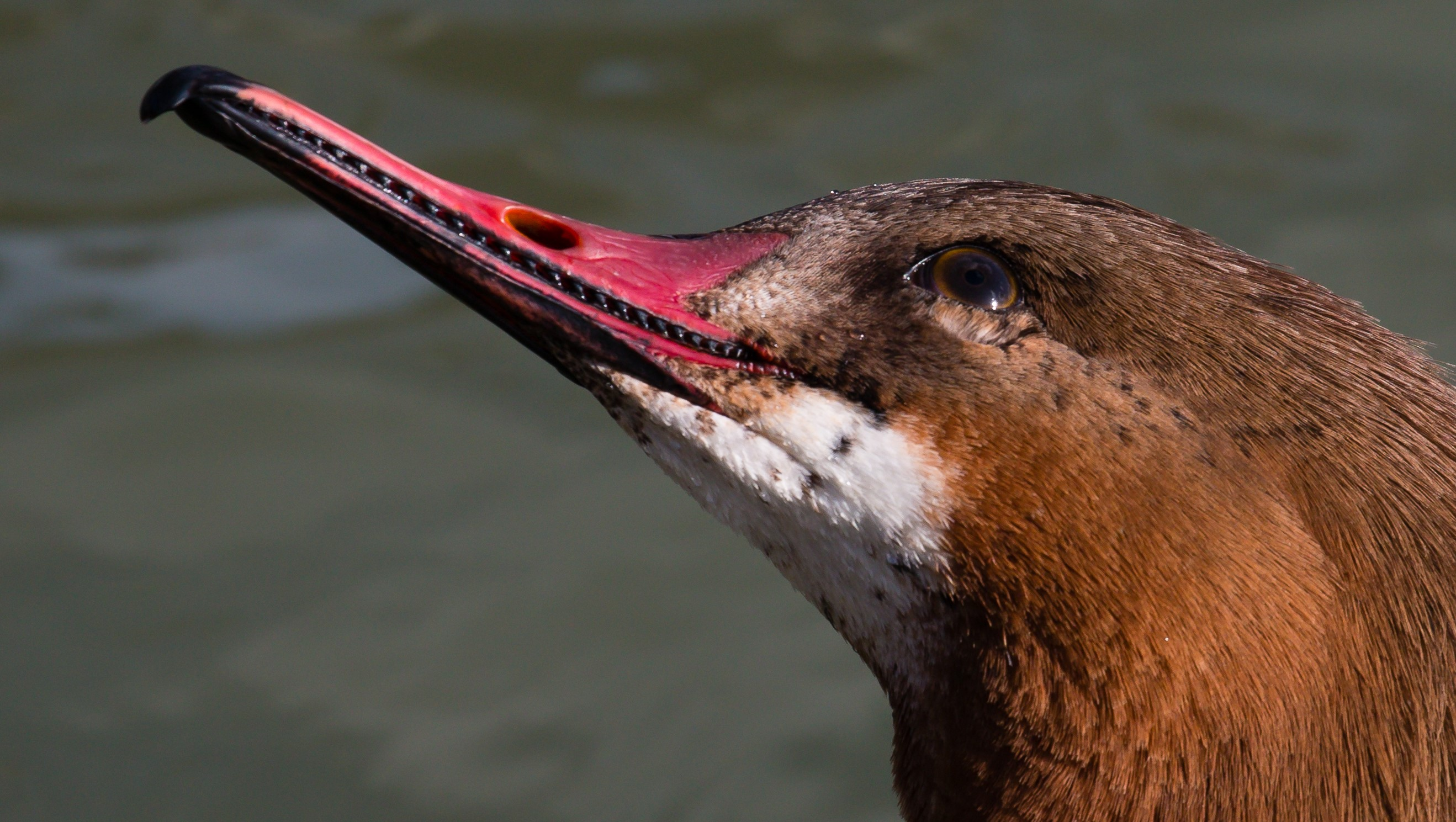
- The skull of Pelagornis mauretanicus (top) and the head of common merganser (bottom) showing the serrated edge common in this group

Scientific classification
- Kingdom: Animalia
- Phylum: Chordata
- Class: Aves
- Superorder: Galloanserae
- Clade: Odontoanserae; Bourdon, 2005

Subgroups
- †Odontopterygiformes?; Anserimorphae Sibley & Ahlquist, 1988; †Gastornithiformes?; †Dromornithidae?; Anseriformes sensu lato; †Conflicto; †Anatalavis; †Presbyornithidae; Anseriformes sensu stricto

= Odontoanserae =

Odontoanserae Temporal range: Maastrichtian–Present

Clade of birds

The Odontoanserae is a proposed clade that includes the family Pelagornithidae (pseudo-toothed birds) and the clade Anserimorphae (the order Anseriformes and their stem-relatives). The placement of the pseudo-toothed birds in the evolutionary tree of birds has been problematic, with some supporting the placement of them near the orders Procellariiformes and Pelecaniformes based on features in the sternum.

In 2005 a cladistic analysis had found support in placing pseudo-toothed birds as the sister group to waterfowl. Evidence for this comes from shared characteristics in the skull such as lack of a crest on the underside of the palatine bone and two condyles on the mandibular process of the quadrate bone, with the middle condyle beakwards of the side condyle. In addition to that, both groups have similar features in their pelvic and pectoral regions. Furthermore, a 2013 study on the growth pattern and structure of the pseudoteeth in Pelagornis mauretanicus shows more support of Odontoanserae as both groups have "soft rhamphotheca, or delayed hardening of the rhamphotheca." In addition to Pelagornithidae and Anseriformes paleontologists also have support in placing mihirungs (Dromornithidae) and Gastornithids into this group, as they also share anatomical features in the skull and pelvic bones with waterfowl. The mihirungs and the gastornithids are more derived than the pseudo-tooth birds and are closer to Anseriformes. One hypothesis is that diatrymas and mihirungs are successive sister groups to anseriforms and another hypothesis places mihirungs as crown anseriforms closely related to the screamers (Anhimidae).

Below is the general consensus of the phylogeny.

- Odontoanserae
  - †Pelagornithidae (pseudo-tooth birds)
  - Anserimorphae
    - †Gastornithidae
    - - †Dromornithidae (mihirungs)
      - - †Vegaviidae
        - Anseriformes (screamers and waterfowl)

However, a 2017 paper by Worthy and colleagues found an alternative phylogeny concerning Anserimorphae. By adding additional new characters, as well as incorporating several new taxa into established matrices, the authors have found gastornithids and mihirungs to be sister taxa which could be placed in the order Gastornithiformes. In addition, they have found support that the family Vegaviidae (usually classified as crown anseriforms or their sister taxon) are more related to gastornithiforms than to anseriforms; accordingly, they have created the monotypic order Vegaviiformes. The authors did note the bootstrap support is weakly supported and several alternative phylogenies in their paper found gastornithiforms to be stem galliforms instead. These too were weakly supported as well. Below is a simplified phylogeny showing their one phylogeny supporting gastornithiforms as anserimorphs.

- Anserimorphae
  - Anseriformes (screamers and waterfowl)
  - - †Vegaviiformes
    - †Gastornithiformes
      - †Gastornithidae
      - †Dromornithidae (mihirungs)

In 2019 a new species Conflicto antarcticus was described from Early Paleocene deposits in Antarctica. Known completely from associated bones from a single individual, Tambussi et al. (2019) incorporated the new taxon into a phylogenetic analysis using the matrix data from Worthy et al. (2017). Their results not only supported the sister grouping of vegaviids with gastornithids and mihirungs (which included Vegaviidae into Gastornithiformes), but also found two taxa, Anatalavis rex and the tall, wading presbyornithids, traditionally placed as part of the anseriform crown, to be stem-anseriforms. Below is the Tambussi et al. (2019) phylogeny.

- Anserimorphae
  - - †Gastornithiformes
      - †Vegaviidae
      - - †Gastornithidae
        - †Dromornithidae (mihirungs)
    - Anseriformes sensu lato
      - - †Conflicto antarcticus
        - †Anatalavis rex
      - - †Presbyornithidae
        - Anseriformes (screamers and waterfowl)

In 2024, the Gastornithiformes was recovered as a paraphyletic group closer to basal Galliformes, while the Dromornithidae was recovered within or close to the Anseriformes.
