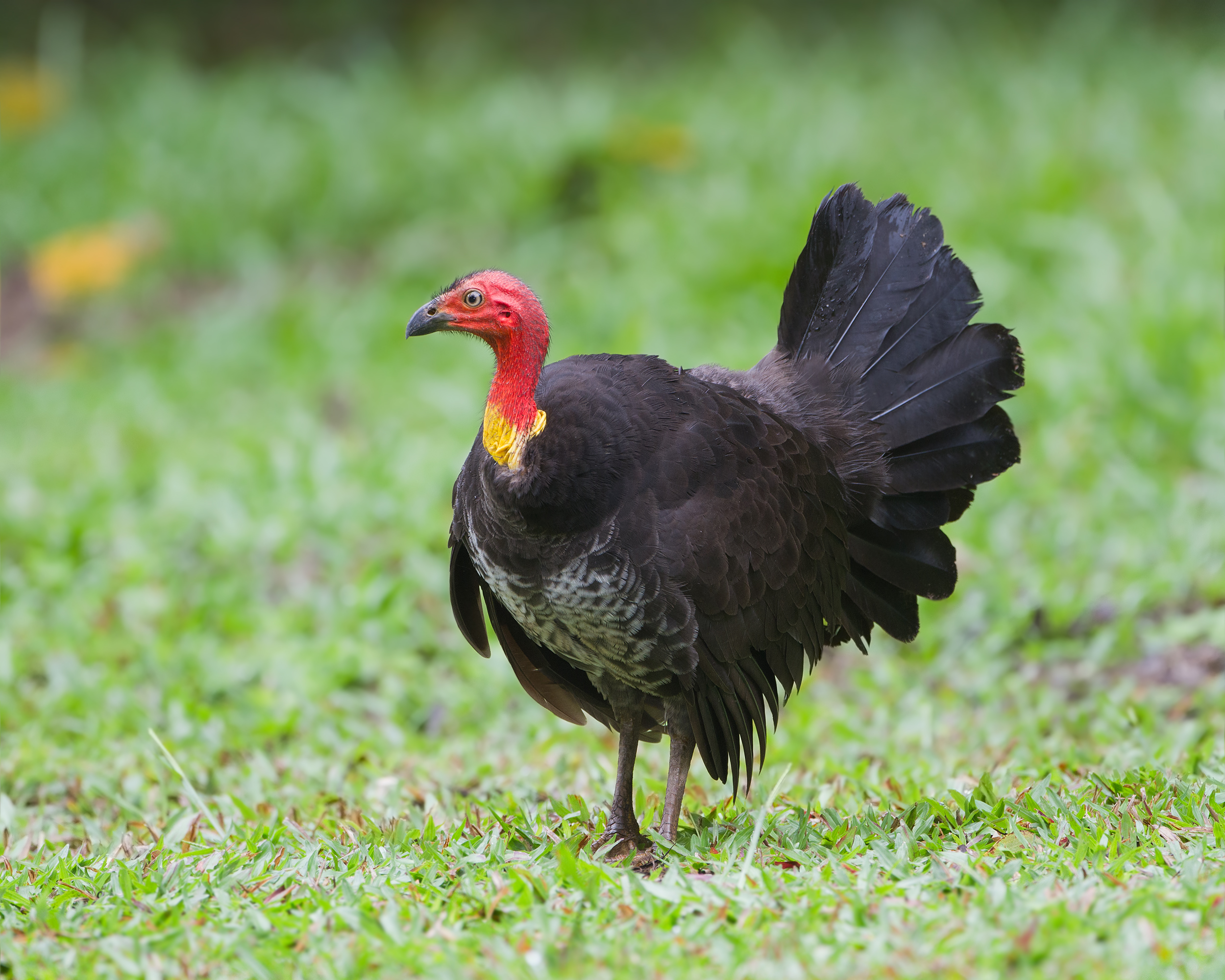
- Australian brushturkey (Alectura lathami)

Scientific classification
- Kingdom: Animalia
- Phylum: Chordata
- Class: Aves
- Infraclass: Neognathae
- Clade: Pangalloanserae
- Superorder: Galloanserae; Sclater, 1880

Subgroups
- Odontoanserae; Pangalliformes; †Gastornithiformes; †Dromornithidae

Synonyms
- Anatophasianae

= Fowl =

Fowls Temporal range: Maastrichtian–Recent Possibly an earlier origin based on molecular clock

Superorder of birds

Fowl are birds belonging to one of two biological orders, namely the gamefowl or landfowl (Galliformes) and the waterfowl (Anseriformes). Anatomical and molecular similarities suggest these two groups are close evolutionary relatives; together, they form the fowl clade which is scientifically known as Galloanserae or Galloanseres (initially termed Galloanseri) (Latin gallus ("rooster") + ānser ("goose")). This clade is also supported by morphological and DNA sequence data as well as retrotransposon presence/absence data.

== Terminology ==
As opposed to "fowl", "poultry" is a term for any kind of domesticated bird or bird captive-raised for meat, eggs, or feathers; ostriches, for example, are sometimes kept as poultry, but are neither gamefowl nor waterfowl. In colloquial speech, however, the term "fowl" is often used near-synonymously with "poultry", and many languages do not distinguish between "poultry" and "fowl". Nonetheless, the fact that the Galliformes and Anseriformes most likely form a monophyletic group makes a distinction between "fowl" and "poultry" warranted.

The historic difference in English is due to the Germanic/Latin split word pairs characteristic of Middle English; the word 'fowl' is of Germanic origin (cf. Old English "fugol", West Frisian fûgel, Dutch vogel, German Vogel, Swedish fågel, Danish/Norwegian fugl), whilst 'poultry' is of Latin pullus ("chicken") via Norman French origin poule ("chicken"); the presence of an initial /p/ in poultry and an initial /f/ in fowl is due to Grimm's Law.

Many birds that are eaten by humans are fowl, including poultry such as chickens or turkeys, game birds such as pheasants or partridges, other wildfowl like guineafowl or peafowl, and waterfowl such as ducks or geese.

== Characteristics ==
While they are quite diverse ecologically and consequently, in an adaptation to their different lifestyles, also morphologically and ethologically, some features still unite water- and landfowl. Many of these, however, are plesiomorphic for Neornithes as a whole, and are also shared with paleognaths.

- Galloanserae are very prolific; they regularly produce clutches of more than five or even more than 10 eggs, which is a lot for such sizeable birds. By comparison, birds of prey and pigeons rarely lay more than two eggs.
- While most living birds are monogamous, at least for a breeding season, many Galloanserae are notoriously polygynous or polyandrous. To ornithologists, this is particularly well known in dabbling ducks, where the males band together occasionally to forcefully mate with unwilling females. The general public is probably most familiar with the polygynous habits of domestic chickens, where usually one or two roosters are kept with a whole flock of females.
- Hybridization is extremely frequent in the Galloanserae, and genera, not usually known to produce viable hybrids in birds, can be brought to interbreed with comparative ease. Guineafowl have successfully produced hybrids with domestic fowl and Indian peafowl, to which they are not particularly closely related as Galliformes go. This is an important factor complicating mtDNA sequence-based research on their relationships. The mallards of North America, for example, are apparently mostly derived from some males which arrived from Siberia, settled down, and mated with American black duck ancestors. See also Gamebird hybrids.
- Galloanserae young are remarkably precocious. Anseriform young are able to swim and dive a few hours after hatching, and the hatchlings of mound-builders (megapodes) are fully feathered and even able to fly for prolonged distances as soon as they emerge from the nest mound.

=== Anatomy ===
Most members of the fowl have the same body configuration. The Bird anatomy page has a description of generalized bird anatomy and physiology, but fowl have some traits specific to them.

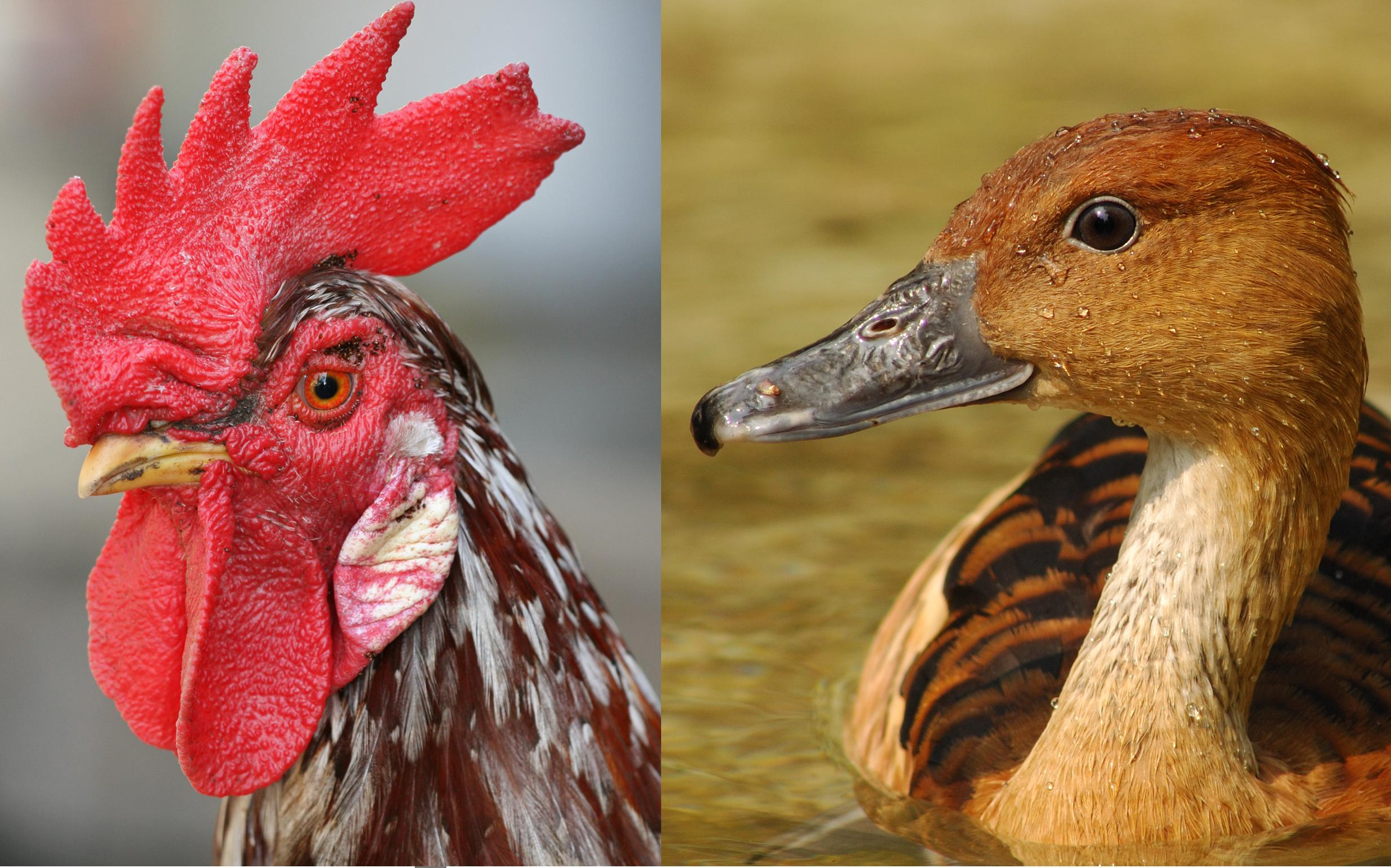
Visual differences between the galliformes and anseriformes beak structures.

Beak differences are visually apparent. The duck and other waterfowl have a flatter bill with a protrusion on the top surface, known as the bean.

The hindlimbs of Galliformes and Anseriformes show major differences. Ducks have a wide, flat underbody with short legs. Their center of gravity is lower compared to Galliformes, and their legs are set further back on the body. This build has been influenced over millions of years to adapt to the aquatic lifestyle and prey capture. Duck leg bones are weaker than ground-adapted fowl, so domestic ducks are not handled by their legs. Waterfowl have greater bending strength in their tibiotarsal bone than Domestic chickens and tolerance for bending stress increased with age. Chickens have stronger legs and are regularly grasped by their legs when picked up.

The feet of each group are unique. The waterfowl are adapted for quickly moving on the surface of the water, and their feet are webbed to allow for this kind of locomotion. Birds that spend long periods standing on ice or cool ground have adapted specialized thermoregulation in their webbed feet. A countercurrent heat exchange system consisting of the warm blood traveling from the body to the foot is grouped near veins that are sending cool blood back to the body. This adaptation minimizes energy expenditure in cold environments.

Chickens are digitigrade, putting their weight on their toes. Most chickens have four digits: three pointing forward and one pointing backward. Their feet are covered in reticulate scales consisting of smooth, overlapping sheets of keratin.

== Systematics and evolution ==
From the fossils that have been recovered, the conclusion that the Galloanserae were already widespread by the end of the Cretaceous is generally accepted. A combination of fossils and molecular clocks estimated the origin of Galloanserae at 85 million years ago. Fossils such as Vegavis indicate that essentially modern waterfowl, albeit belonging to a now-extinct lineage, were contemporaries of the non-avian dinosaurs. While the dominant avialans of the Mesozoic Era, the Enantiornithes, died out with all other non-avian dinosaurs, the Galloanserae (fowl) survived to become the first successful group of modern birds after the other dinosaurs died out.

As opposed to the morphologically fairly conservative Galliformes, the Anseriformes have adapted to filter-feeding and are characterized by many autapomorphies related to this lifestyle. The extremely advanced feeding systems of the Anseriformes, together with similarities of the early anseriform Presbyornis to shorebirds, had formerly prompted some scientists to ally Anseriformes with Charadriiformes, instead. However, as strong support for the Galloanserae has emerged in subsequent studies, the fowl clade continues to be accepted as a genuine evolutionary lineage by the vast majority of scientists.

== Relationship with humans ==
=== Spiritual meanings and representations ===
Fowl have deep spiritual meanings and roots in ancient cultures, such as Hinduism in India and in many Pagan cultures throughout the world. The peacock, for example, represents truth, beauty, honor, and strength and dreams of peacocks are referred to as good omens.

=== As food ===
Fowl are frequently kept for both meat and eggs. Chickens, by far, are the most heavily consumed and farmed out of all of them. Other fowl commonly used in cooking include ducks, geese, turkeys and quail.

=== As game ===
Various species of fowl are hunted for both sport and food. Pheasants have been widely introduced and naturalized outside of their native range in Asia to Europe and North America for use as food and sport.
