= Burke, Wills, King and Yandruwandha National Heritage Place =

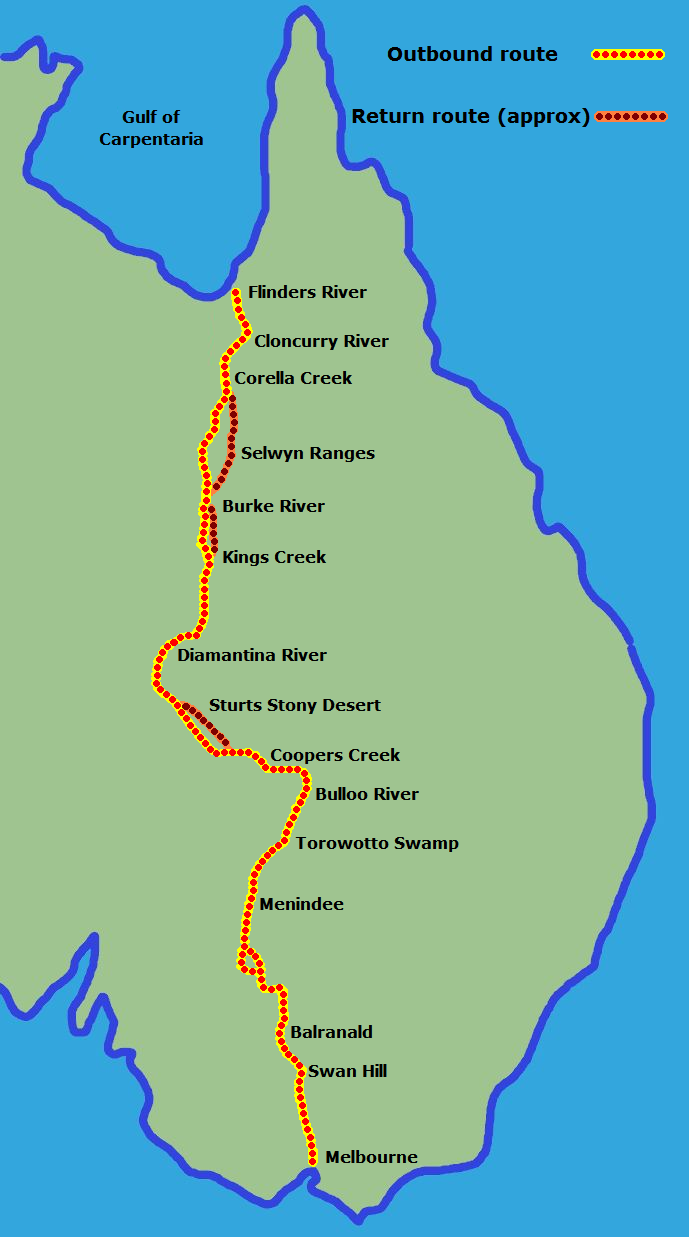
- Burke and Wills route
- Interactive map of Burke, Wills, King and Yandruwandha National Heritage Place
- 27.7008°S 140.8379°E
- Location: Birdsville Track, Innamincka, South Australia

Australian National Heritage List
- Official name: The Burke, Wills, King and Yandruwandha National Heritage Place
- Type: Listed place (Historic)
- Designated: 22 January 2016
- Reference no.: 106061

The Burke, Wills, King and Yandruwandha National Heritage Place is a heritage-listed historic precinct on the Birdsville Track, Innamincka, South Australia, Australia. It was added to the Australian National Heritage List on 22 January 2016.

== History ==
The Birdsville and Strzelecki Tracks have an earlier history and are part of Aboriginal trails, trade and custom. Neither has ever been a single fixed route for long. Over time, the footprint and hoofprint trails of both tracks have shifted, fluctuated and occasionally disappeared, only to reemerge later.

It is generally accepted that Australia's desert regions have been occupied since approximately 30,000 to 40,000 BP. In the preliminary assessment area, archaeologists have found some sites that are between 12,000 and 15,000 years old. Prior to the establishment of 19th century European and Afghan settlements in the region, evidence exists which points to Aboriginal people from fourteen or more language groups moving through and living in the rugged arid lands of central Australia.

The Birdsville and Strzelecki tracks extend over various Aboriginal territories, including those of the Yandruwandha people (including Innamincka), Diyari people (Dieri), Wonkangurru, Ngamini, Gawarawarga, Garanguru and Yarlijandi. The explorer John King did not record information about the language or identity of the people who saved his life except that they knew the word "White Man", which suggests a degree of prior knowledge and possibly contact with Europeans.

News of the arrival of people from Europe, Asia and elsewhere could have arrived through the network of traditional routes whereby goods and cultural knowledge were communicated far and wide across the continent. In this region, "networks of contact between individuals and groups allowed prized goods to be distributed across the region," including red ochre, gypsum for rain making ceremonies, hardwoods and softwoods, stone axe heads, shells, weapons and tools. The waters of Strzelecki Creek, the Cooper Creek system and the Great Artesian Basin dictated the cultural geography and survival.

The movement along these routes not only allowed for the distribution of objects, resources and goods, but also culture. The movement helped to establish important relationships between groups, and connection with country as the rituals, ceremonies and myths that reinforced them (the trade routes) were of great social importance. These trade routes and tracks were used by Indigenous Australians for thousands of years and many tracks remain culturally significant today. Non-Indigenous people utilised Indigenous pathways in their attempts to explore and settle this part of the country. The Birdsville and Strzelecki Tracks were used as stock routes for overlanding sheep and cattle from the centre of Australia to southern markets. The tracks became the traditional transport corridors across the north-east of South Australia, to the east of Lake Eyre and connected the former railhead at Marree to the Channel Country of south-western Queensland. Some of ancient trade routes "now form the origin of the highways where modern tourists now travel".

=== Early Exploration in the centre of Australia ===
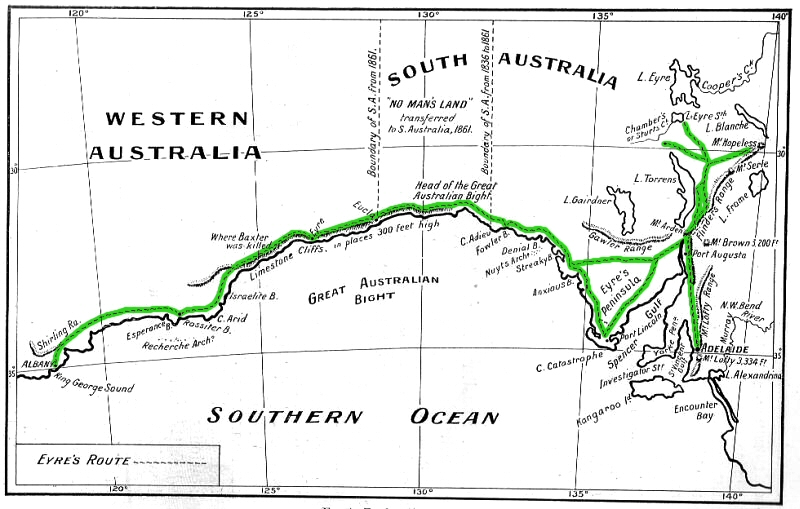
Routes of Eyre (1840 and 1841)

In 1839 and 1840 Edward Eyre, supported by the recently established government in Adelaide, travelled into northern South Australia in search of grazing land. Each of the colonies was very interested in the great unknown which was central and northern Australia. The reports made by Eyre were disappointing; he travelled past the Flinders Ranges to discover a horseshoe of impassable salt lakes: Lake Torrens, Lake Eyre, Lake Blanche, Lake Callabonna and Lake Frome. Eyre's expedition coincided with a dry period; from the aptly named "Mount Hopeless" he described inland South Australia as a "dreary waste".

In 1844 Charles Sturt followed Eyre and discovered the Strzelecki Creek which he named after his colleague, Paul Edmond de Strzelecki, and the main watercourses which fed Lake Eyre: Cooper Creek, Eyre Creek and the Georgina River. Sturt failed to realise the significance of his discoveries and corroborated Eyre's reports that the region would not support grazing.

The thirst of pastoralists for new grazing land in South Australia was unquenchable. Graziers began squatting past the surveyed boundaries of the northern frontier. They were frustrated by the slow pace of government surveys and the land tenure principles of the Wakefield Plan which favoured landownership over leasehold. In 1842 the South Australian Legislative Council broke away from the Wakefield Plan by passing An Act to Protect the Waste Lands of the Crown from Encroachment, Intrusion and Trespass. This act allowed pastoralists to lease land on an annual renewable basis based on a system of sight-lines between landmarks rather than formal survey. This provided a degree of security for pastoralists and allowed the government to collect revenue from the lease agreements.

In 1851 the Waste Lands Act was enacted which extended leases from one year to fourteen years and an incentive scheme was introduced which gave preferential leasing rights to the discoverer of new grazing land. A number of other changes also supported pastoral expansion in South Australia during the 1850s: a decade of high rainfall, the high price of wool, and the availability of easy finance thanks to the wealth created by the gold rush.

Water, geographic and climatic knowledge of the Birdsville and Strzelecki region improved in the 1850s thanks to a series of expeditions and discoveries made by Benjamin Herschel Babbage, Sir Augustus Gregory, John Stuart and Peter Warburton.

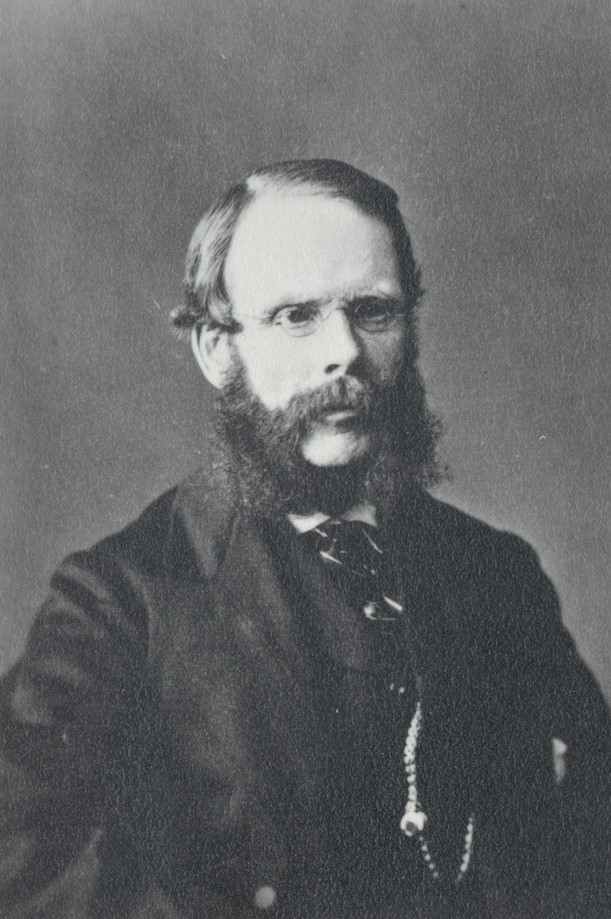
Benjamin Herschel Babbage, 1873

In 1856 Babbage, an engineer searching for gold, discovered two permanent waterholes in the MacDonnell River that led him to believe that he could pass Eyre's impassable horseshoe. In 1858 Babbage and Warburton discovered the Mound Springs and the following year John Stuart discovered a permanent waterhole known today as Stuart Creek.

In 1858 Sir Augustus Gregory was asked by the NSW Government to search for the missing explorer, Ludwig Leichhardt, who in 1846 set out on an expedition to cross the continent from east to west and was never seen again. After the search for Leichhardt was abandoned, Gregory travelled into South Australia via the Strzelecki Creek and dispelled Eyre's impassable horseshoe theory. These discoveries led to a wave of pastoral expansion in the Birdsville and Strzelecki Tracks region.

By the middle of the 19th century, Europeans had explored large parts of the Australian continent but had failed to cross the country from south to north. The need to connect the isolated settlements of the north coast, facilitate trade and communication with the rest of the world and secure grazing land culminated in a race between South Australia and Victoria across the continent.

In the early 19th century three theories existed about what lay at the heart of Australia: a vast desert, an inland sea or a great river. The drawing up of colonial boundaries in 1860 had left a large tract of unclaimed land on the northern coast of Australia. The land remained nominally a part of New South Wales who showed little interest in exploring and opening it up. Visions of rich grazing land and other natural assets piqued the interest of Queensland, South Australia and Victoria who each set about claiming it for themselves.

South Australia and Queensland both made submissions to the Colonial Office to have the land incorporated into their territory or alternatively divided between them. Victoria was a small colony which had expanded to its territorial limits, and with no adjacent unclaimed land looked to the north to fulfil its ambitions. The gold rush of the 1850s had enabled Victoria to amass a substantial wealth that led to the creation of numerous scientific and cultural societies such as the Royal Society of Victoria. The mystery of Australia's center was at odds with Victoria's new sense of cultural and scientific sophistication. Victorian hubris refused to let the mystery remain unsolved and the Royal Society of Victoria set about filling in the blanks on the map of Australia by organizing an expedition which would cross the continent from south to north.

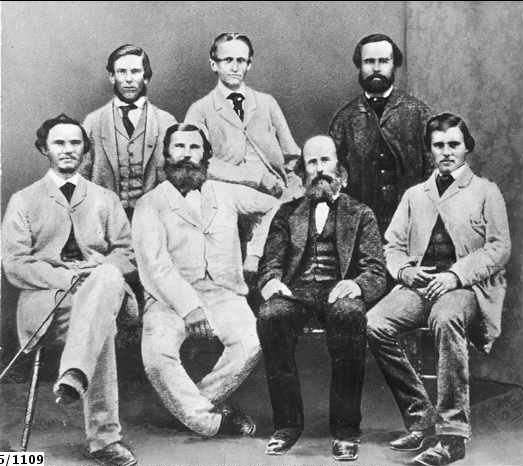
Sixth Stuart Expedition party, 1861

The race to discover the center of Australia and claim the northern land was between South Australia and Victoria. The South Australian government offered a reward of £2,000 for the first successful crossing to the north coast of Australia. In March, 1860, John McDouall Stuart set out from Chambers Creek and travelled north past the Mound Springs system and passed through the MacDonnell Range which he named after the then Governor of South Australia. Stuart and his party arrived at Tennant Creek in June 1860 but were pushed back by the hostile environment.

In 1861 Stuart and his party of ten men and forty-seven horses attempted a second crossing of the continent, well aware that Burke and Wills had already set off from Victoria with the same goal in mind. Stuart was again turned back and returned to Adelaide suffering blindness. Stuart recovered and within the month launched another expedition. On 24 July 1862 Stuart and his party reached the north coast of Australia at the Arafura Sea. Stuart had discovered a route from south to north. His expedition had enormous implications for both South Australia and Australia. Stuart retired soon after and returned to England but his years of exploration caught up with him and he died three years later.

=== The Burke and Wills Expedition 1860-1861 ===
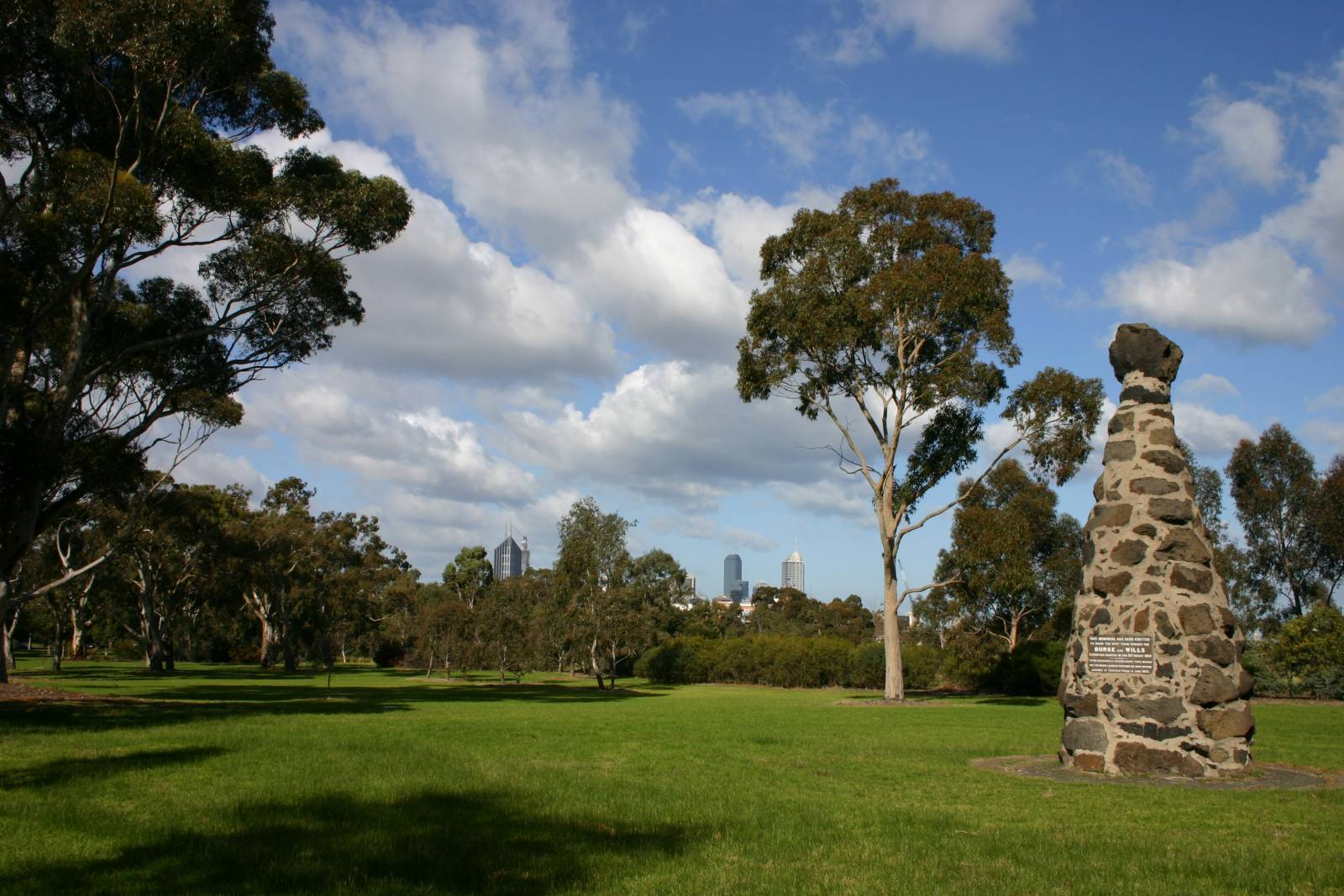
Royal Park from where the expedition departed, a memorial commemorates the event

Melbourne was 23 years old in 1858, and had been established as the Colony of Victoria for just seven years. Citizens of the Australian colonies at that time knew very little of the "ghastly blank" in the centre of the continent. In 1860 the Royal Society of Victoria established the Exploration Committee. The committee was a consortium of Victoria's scientific, social and economic elite charged with organizing the Victorian Exploring Expedition. The Victorian Exploring Expedition was the most "lavishly equipped exploration party in Australian history" assembled for the purpose of crossing the continent and incorporating the unclaimed grazing land into its territory. The Victorian Exploring Expedition was posthumously renamed the "Burke and Wills Expedition". The expedition involved 19 men, 26 camels, 23 horses, and several supply wagons.

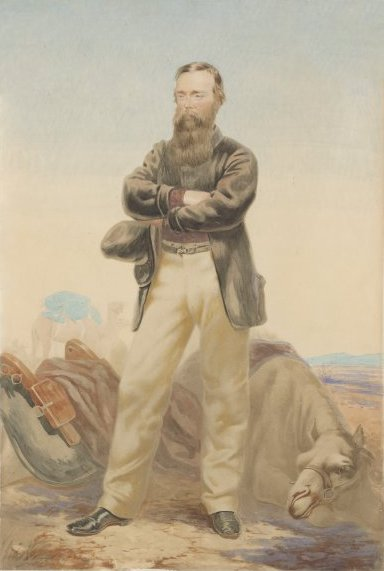
Portrait of Robert O'Hara Burke, by William Strutt, 1860

The expedition was led by Robert Burke, an Irish superintendent, who was "...a product of that heroic age of empire which believed that a gentleman of good breeding with a confident military manner and an impressive beard must make an effective leader". Burke was considered a hot tempered man known for his penchant for gambling and the opposite sex. Burke's prowess did not extend to the field of exploration and was notorious for not having a sense of direction. A local newspaper once wrote that Burke "could not tell the north from the south in broad daylight, and the Southern Cross as a guide was a never ending puzzle to him". During the process of selecting an expedition leader, rival factions emerged within the Exploration Committee who each championed their own man. Burke's appointment was highly controversial and attracted criticism from the media who questioned his experience and suitability for the position.

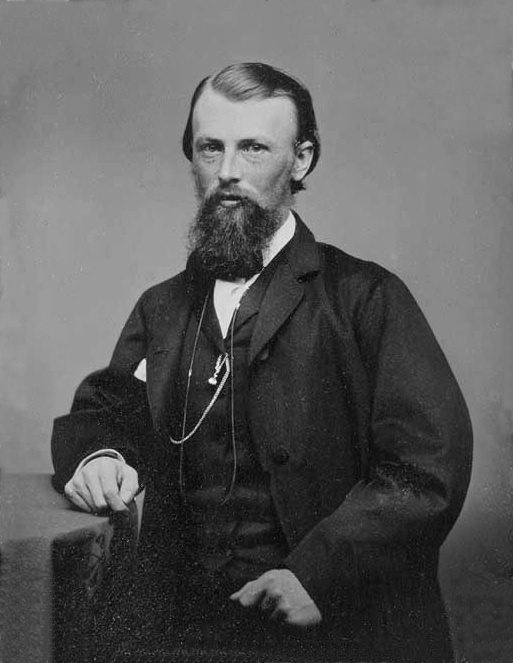
William John Wills

The members of the expedition party generally fell into two categories; the scientists and the labourers. The scientific members of the party included William Wills who was the party's surveyor, meteorological and astronomical observer and originally the third-in-command. Wills was a talented and devout scientist who had a passion for the Australian outback; his cool and collected manner helped to balance out Burke's temper and capricious nature. Dr. Hermann Beckler was the medical officer and botanist. Ludwig Becker completed the scientific contingent and was recruited for the position of naturalist.

The Exploration Committee, conscious of Stuart's expeditions, ordered the party to travel quickly; a directive at odds with the amount of equipment being transported which reportedly included twelve sets of dandruff brushes, four enema kits, a large bathtub and an oak and cedar table complete with stools. The equipment was estimated to weigh in excess of 20 tonnes including food that was expected to last two years.

The expedition set out from Royal Park in Melbourne on 20 August 1860 to considerable fanfare from around 15,000 spectators. The party consisted of 22 men however by the time of its final reorganisation at Menindee in October 1860, some 30 men had been employed. A stone cairn that marks the expedition's departure point from Royal Park was erected in 1890 and is located at the corner of The Avenue and Macarthur Road. Controversy followed the party every step of the way and by the time they arrived in Menindee, their spirits were low. Along the way some of the men had been fired or had resigned whilst others had been recruited. The trundling party took a staggering 56 days to make the 750 kilometre journey to Menindee. The expedition was experiencing financial hardship and had begun to auction its supplies in an effort to raise funds and increase speed. George Landells was originally appointed as second-in-command and was responsible for importing the camels and communicating with their foreign handlers. Landells and Burke had a number of arguments which resulted in a challenge to a pistol duel and Landell's resignation. Wills was promoted by Burke to replace Landells as the second in command of the expedition.

From the outset the expedition relied on Aboriginal guides and messengers to assist their progress. Becker's third report notes: "We left Terickenkom (north of Balranald as they headed towards the Darling) at 11 a.m. and marched slowly over a heavy ground. A black fellow guided us through the Mallee scrub however the old track was visible enough even for a white fellows eye". Wills' diary of 22 and 23 September acknowledge Aboriginal guides "Martin the black fellow" and "a guide from Eungin "Simon" a blackfellow who took us along an out station track".

A few days later Dr Beckler recorded that his wagon group left Cole's water hole (known as Cole Lagoon north of Swan Hill NSW) on 24 September. "Marched at 71/4am in a N.W by N. Direction. A young native, acting as a guide, sat on one of the wagons, while his uncle Whitepepper (Watpiba) the "old man"... walked in front of us with a fire-stick in one hand and a yam-stick in the other". Becker's fourth report of 25 September notes he "learned that Mr Burke has send [sic] a black-fellow with a message to Dr Beckler, and the Native advised him to take another, a shorter, trip through the bush, the road I have taken being a longer one. Having lost my way in the open plain I was by this saved from being bushed for the night, as I never could have met in time my fellow travelers".

==== The Menindee Depot ====
Burke established a depot at Menindee under the charge of Dr Beckler. Burke instructed the Menindee party to construct a fortified supply depot and await further instructions. Burke's "advanced party" would travel north to locate a suitable site for the second supply depot that would support the final leg of the expedition to the Gulf of Carpentaria. Whilst in Menindee, Burke procured the services of an experienced bushman named William Wright who acted as a guide to the remainder of the expedition party on their journey towards Cooper Creek.

The Menindee party, under the leadership of Dr Beckler, consisted of Dr Ludwig Becker (artist, naturalist, and geologist); William Hodgkinson (artist); Alexander McPherson (saddler); Myles Lyons (trooper); and Belooch Khan (cameleer). Wright later recruited Charles Stone (an 'experienced bushman'); William Purcell (depot cook) and John Smith, a part-Aboriginal bushman (cameleer).

On 10 November 1860 Lyons and McPherson set out from Menindee, accompanied by the Aboriginal tracker known to them as "Dick", to follow Burke's trail and pass him urgent dispatches from the Exploration Committee in Melbourne. Dick guided the party as far as Torowoto but as the weeks past and they failed to find Burke, they ran short of water and supplies. The party had travelled over 400 miles and their horse had died. Their situation compelled them to give up their search for Burke and return to their camp. Lyons and McPherson became increasingly weakened and Dick realised they were unfit to travel. He left the pair in the care of some Aboriginal people near Torowoto and returned to the Menindee Depot to raise the alarm. Dr. Beckler's diary notes that "he: saw a native approaching our camp... it must be Mountain (Dick)... His previously fall [sic] face was sunken, his tottering legs could hardly carry him, his feet were raw...".

Under orders from Wright, Dr. Beckler set out on 21 December to find McPherson and Lyons, accompanied by Belooch and the Aboriginal, Peter, "to whom Mountain (Dick) had described our route as well as possible".

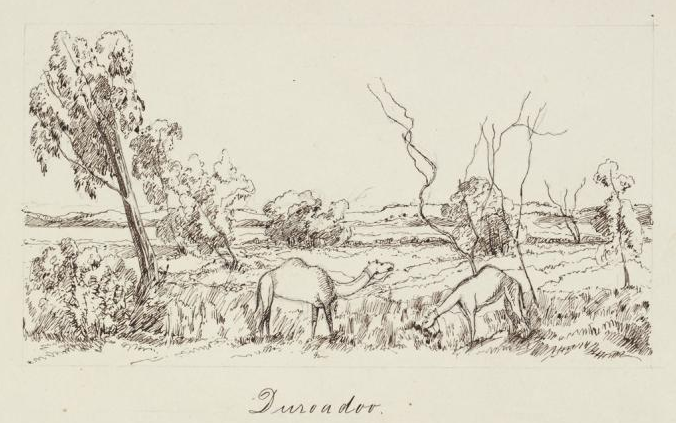
Duroadoo, sketched by Hermann Beckler, 1861

Two of the natives that had accompanied Burke for a good stretch from Duroadoo (Torowoto) (north of the first main camp at Menindee NSW)] came to us after Dick had spoken to them and they promised us some water fowl. They stayed with us for two days longer than the other natives... Sometimes they brought us an iguana (goanna) at other times a snake or several large insect larvae (Witchetty grubs). In return we gave them all our spare clothing... After many questions... three guides finally led us to Lyon's and McPherson's camp site.... We gave the guides gifts.... They were overjoyed and took pains to show their gratitude in every way.

Lyons and McPherson were subsequently found and returned safely to the depot.

A week later, on 28 December Dr. Beckler's party returned from Torowoto to Cooper Creek with Lyons and McPherson (who) rode on the camels and the rest walked.... Peter led the way to a broad creek where the fire was blazing on the opposite bank, in the camp site of a large group of natives. They waded across the creek to meet us and when they recognised Peter as one of their own, they became very excited and crowded around us give us the universal greeting "Belara, Knappa, balera, imba, imba, belara" (Good, I good, you good).

The guide's heroic action was commemorated in a portrait drawn by Dr. Ludwig Becker entitled "Dick, the brave and gallant native guide". Dick was later presented with a medal (breast plate) and five sovereigns at a ceremony in Melbourne. An extract from The Bendigo Advertiser (26 September 1861) records "On Monday afternoon (23 September 1861) at the Hall of the Royal Society, His Excellency Henry Barkly, in the presence of several gentlemen, presented Dick... with a brass plate and chain and five sovereigns... Dick. I understand this has been given to you by the Queen's Government for rescuing Trooper Lyons and Saddler McPherson". It was fitting that this award, the only bravery award made as a result of the expedition, should have been made to an Aboriginal person.

==== The Fort Wills Depot ====
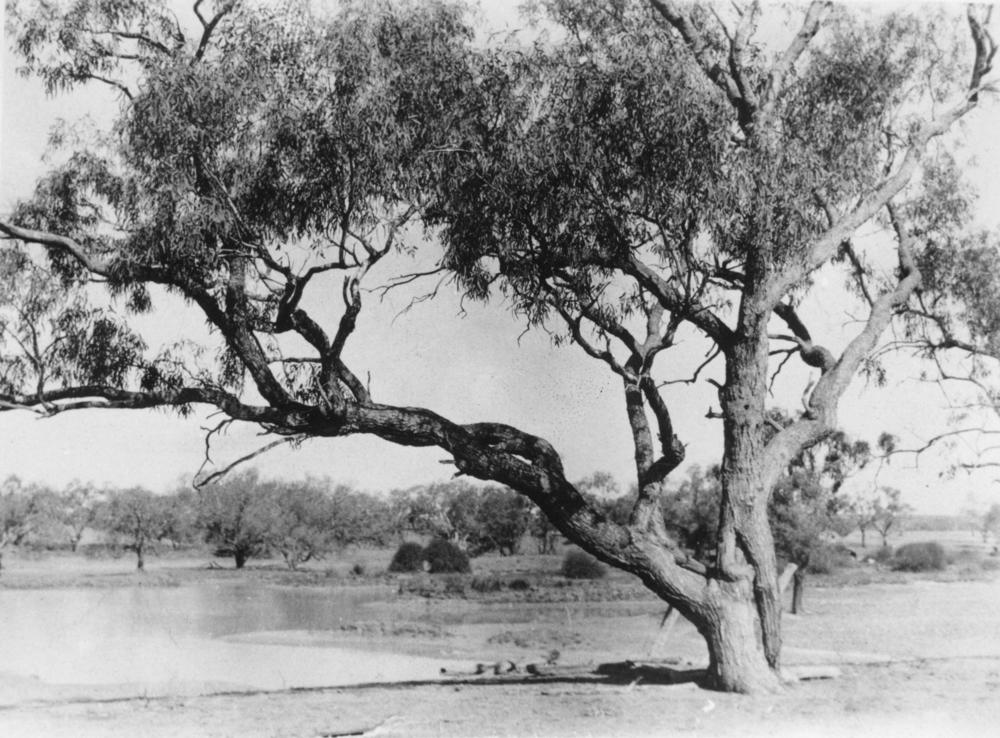
Fort Wills

Burke's advanced party consisted of William John Wills (surveyor, astronomical observer and second-in-command), John King (assistant and cameleer), Charles Gray (horse and supply handler and cook), William Brahe, William Patten and Thomas McDonough (assistants) and Dost Mahomet (cameleer). William Wright (now third-in-command) travelled with the advance party as far as Torowoto to find water and the best course northwards before being sent back to Menindee by Burke to command the supply party. Wright along with two Aboriginal boys, Dick and an unnamed boy acted as guides for the party.

The party made a total of eight camp sites as they travelled northwards along the Cooper Creek. They established the Fort Wills Depot on 11 November on the northern bank of the Bulloo Bulloo Waterhole. At Fort Wills, Burke once again split the party, forming his gulf party that would make its final dash to the Gulf of Carpentaria. Burke placed Brahe in charge of the "depot party" and instructed him to construct a fort to hold the remaining ammunition and supplies. Burke ordered Brahe to wait for the gulf party at Fort Wills for three months or until their supplies had been exhausted. Brahe was then to return to the Menindee Depot. Wills secretly instructed Brahe to wait for four months. Before leaving, Burke cautioned Brahe to have minimal contact with the Aboriginal people and use force if necessary to deter them. Despite this, local Aboriginal people visited the camp regularly and exchanged food and goods; there were incidents of occasional petty thieving.

Brahe and the men under his charge remained at Fort Wills for four months. During this time they constructed a timber stockade to protect their supplies. The friendly overtures of the Aboriginal people that frequented the camp were often repelled by European gunfire. During the time that Brahe was at the depot he "shouted at, physically hit or fired on Aborigines on four occasions". Brahe's diary of 16 December notes that: "a large tribe of blacks came pestering us to go to their camp and have a dance, which we declined. They were very troublesome, and nothing but the threat to shoot them will keep them away".

The Aboriginal people often persisted with efforts to engage with the explorers. Brahe noted:

"Blacks passing now and then offering us nets and fish; we made it a rule never to accept the least thing from them, but made some of them little presents of left off clothes".

==== The Gulf Party ====
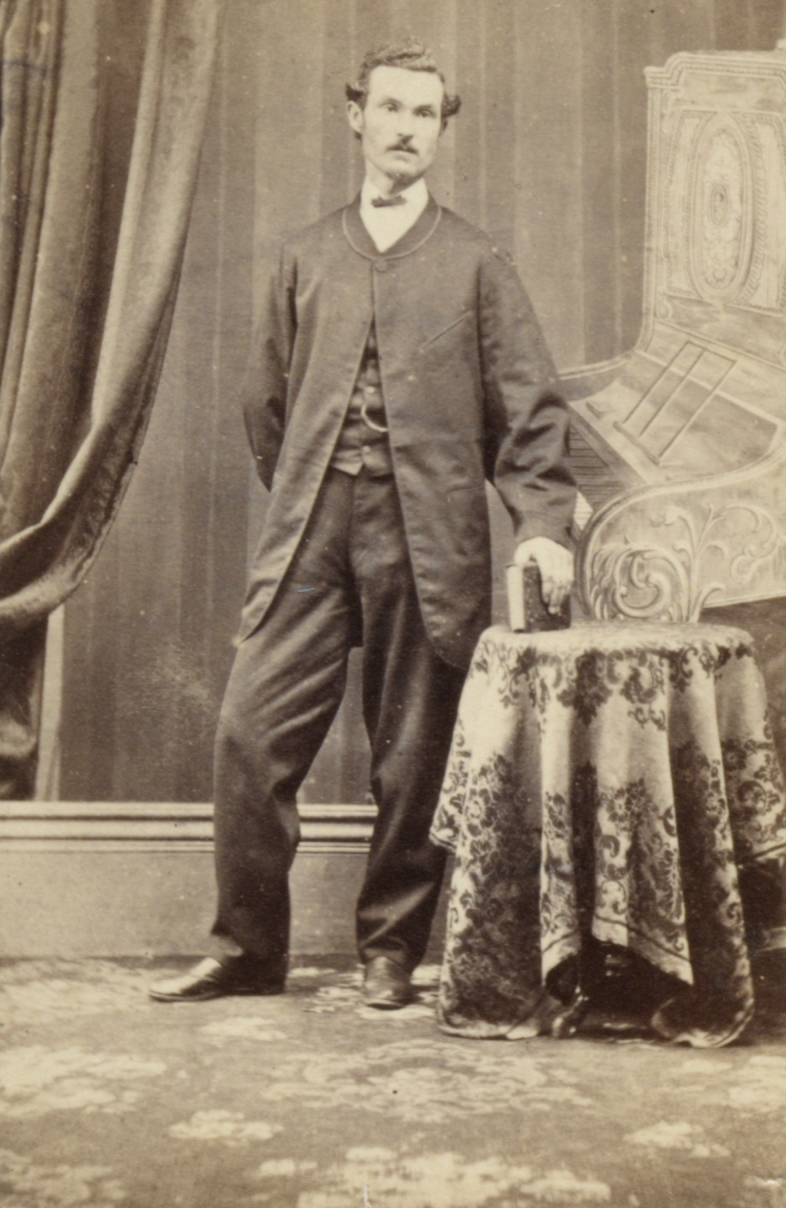
John King, circa 1861

On 16 December 1860, in the height of summer, the forward party consisting of Burke, Wills, John King and Charles Gray left the Fort Wills depot along with six camels, one horse and three months' worth of supplies.

Despite Burke's resolve to refrain from contact with Aboriginal people, his party continued to engage with and rely on Aboriginal hospitality as he passed through their country. Wills' Field Book 1 of 16 December notes:

"There was a large camp of not less than forty or fifty black near where we stopped. They brought us presents of fish, for which we gave them some beads, and matches. These fish we found to be a most valuable addition to our rations ".

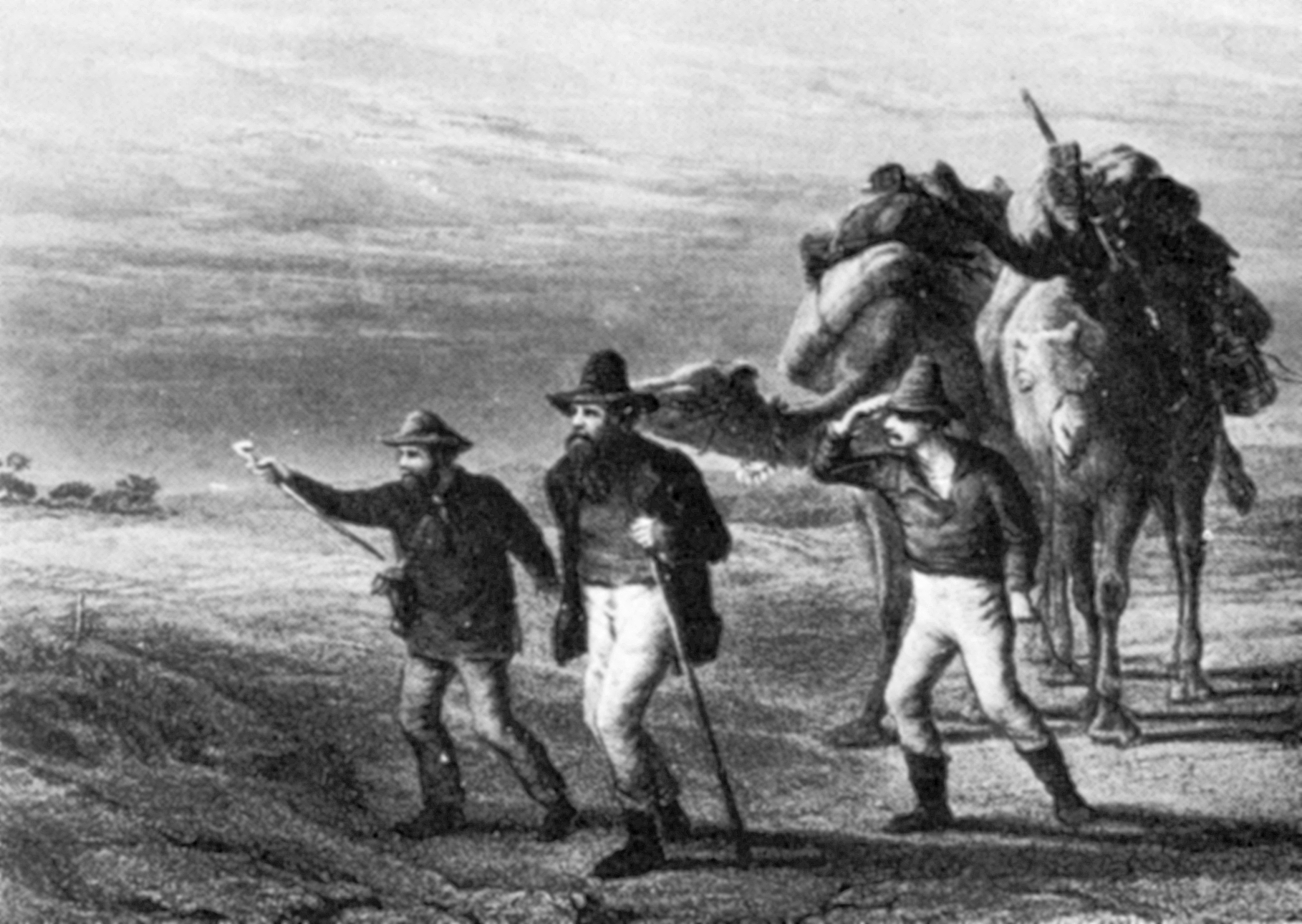
"Burke, Wills and King on the way back from the Gulf of Carpentaria", by Nicholas Chevalier, 1868

Rather than being aggressive, both the Yandruwandha, on the Cooper, and the Diyari closer to Lake Eyre were hospitable, shared food and generally attempted to draw the Europeans into a web of relations through invitations of a social or sexual nature. Four days after the journey to the Gulf had begun; Burke observed further attempts by the Aboriginal people to extend social relations to include the explorers, noting, "we found a great many natives. They presented us with fish, and offered their women".

Wills' field journal notes that as the explorers neared the Gulf of Carpentaria they:

...came to a channel through which the sea water enters. Here we passed three blacks, who, as is universally their custom, pointed out to us, unasked, the best part down. This assisted us greatly, for the ground we were taking was very boggy.

On 10 February 1861 Burke's party reached the tidal channel, technically fulfilling their objective of traversing the country, but were unable to cross dense mangrove swamps and reach the sea. Tired and hungry, they failed to leave a monument of their achievement, but instead contemplated the long march back to Fort Wills with only a quarter of their supplies remaining. The race to the north was for their glory, the march back south was for their survival.

On the return leg of their journey to Fort Wills, Burke had to introduce strict rationing. The humid conditions of the tropics gave way to the dry heat of the desert and the men's strength began to ebb away. As the supplies dwindled, animals were slaughtered and equipment abandoned. By the end of March they were desperately short of provisions, killing their camel and drying the meat for supplies. Gray became ill and stole some flour for which he was severely beaten by Burke. Gray died from hunger and exhaustion on 17 April and the party stopped for a day to bury him before continuing south.

==== The return to Fort Wills ====
As the deadline came and went, Brahe became increasingly anxious as scurvy and hunger spread through the camp. Brahe abandoned Fort Wills on the morning of 21 April, four months and one week after their arrival, believing Burke and his party must have perished or turned to Queensland for their return journey home. Brahe's party left for Menindee after burying supplies near a tree and blazing a message that indicated the location of the supplies in its trunk. The exact wording and content of the message has been subject to considerable debate over the years.

In an extraordinary twist of fate, Burke, Wills and King arrived at the Cooper Creek depot on the afternoon of 21 April only to discover that the camp had been abandoned by Brahe's party just nine hours earlier. Their weakened state prevented them from attempting to catch up with them. Searching the camp they discovered the Dig Tree message and recovered the small cache of supplies.

Burke, Wills and King debated their options. Wills and King were in favour of retracing their steps to Menindee which was 650 km away. Burke suggested making the 240 km trip down the Strzelecki Creek to Mount Hopeless Station. The three men recuperated at the depot, before heading south down the Strzelecki Track towards South Australia and Mt Hopeless Station on 22 April. They continued to receive friendly overtures from the Aboriginal people in the area. On 24 April Wills' diary records:

As we about to start this morning some blacks came by from whom we were fortunate enough to get about twelve pounds of fish for a few pieces of straps and some matches, &c. This is a great treat for us as well as a valuable addition to our rations.

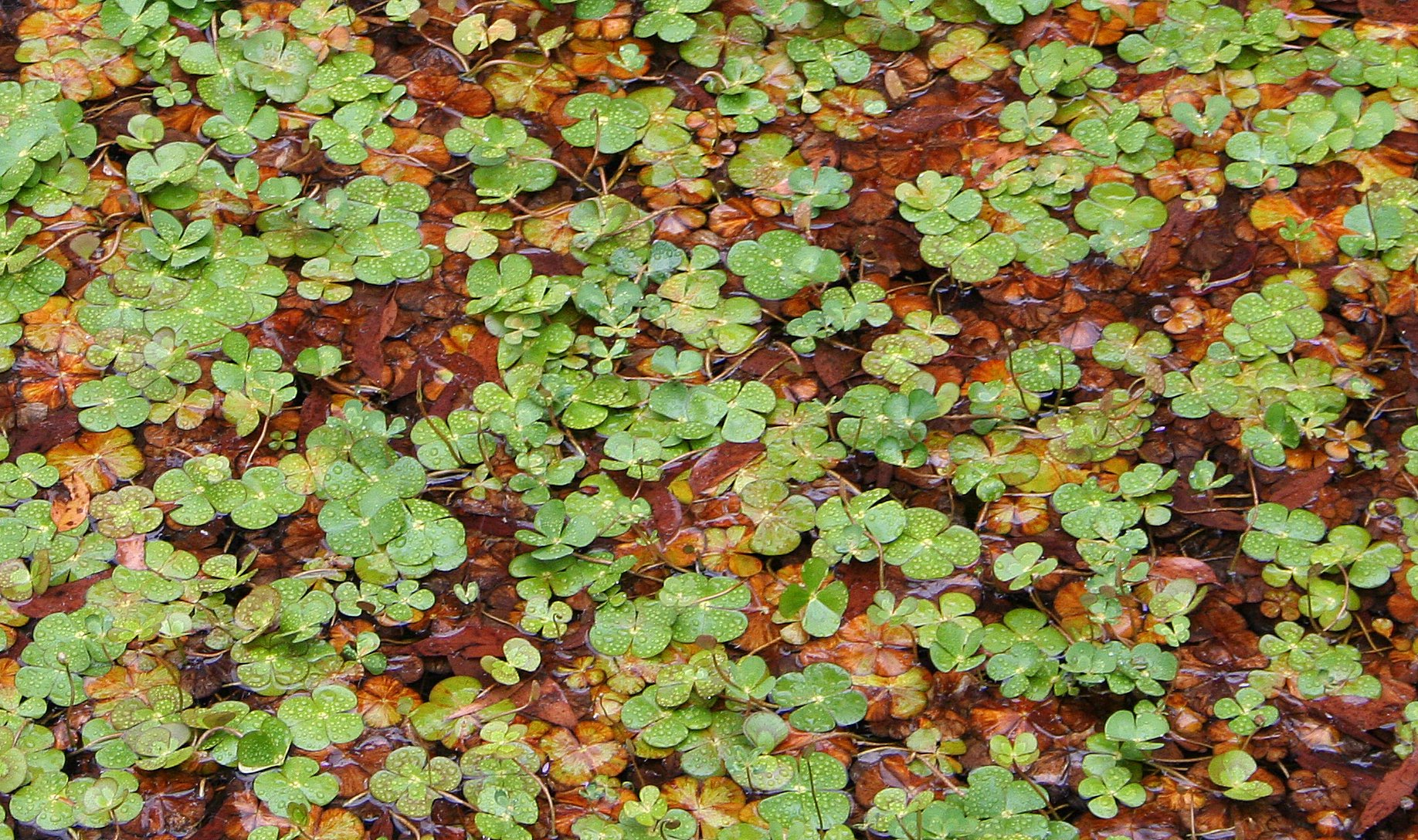
Nardoo, an aquatic fern

On 30 May, at Burke's request, Wills returned to Fort Wills to check for signs of disturbance from the other parties. Incomprehensibly, Wills also failed to notice any evidence of a recent visit to the depot by Wright and Brahe who had doubled back on the off chance that the gulf party had returned to the depot. Wills buried his field books and left a note before returning to Burke and King. Burke, Wills and King were exhausted and continued to weaken steadily despite holding some remaining supplies and having regular exchanges of fish, wild ducks, nardoo and other foodstuffs with the Yandruwandha.

After departing Fort Wills, Burke, Wills and King travelled south down Cooper Creek, accepting assistance from Aboriginal people in the form of fresh fish and nardoo. Nardoo is an aquatic fern, resembling a four-leaf clover which was ground to a flour and mixed with water to form an edible "porridge". Wills notes on 24 May "Started with King to celebrate the Queen's birthday by fetching from Nardoo Creek what is now to us the staff of life". The party subsisted on this diet, which required a considerable amount of preparation and offered little nutritional value. As their supplies dwindled they became more and more dependent on the hospitality extended to them by Aboriginal people.

==== Koorliatto Creek ====
Bulla or Koorliatto, view from the camp up and down the Creek, by Hermann Beckler, 1861

Meanwhile, Wright had returned to Menindee as per Burke's instruction to transport the remaining supplies to Fort Wills. Wright took a considerable amount of time to execute his duties because Beckler refused to accept his command until it was officially approved by the Exploration Committee. After Wright's position was endorsed and additional funds were sent, he began to make his way to Fort Wills. Several members of the Menindee party, including Beckler, died during the trip.

Severe illness began to take a toll on the members of the supply party as the full heat of summer began to take effect and water in the clay pans almost disappeared. Along the way they continued to seek out water sources for themselves and their animals, placing increasing pressure on the dwindling water resources and reportedly causing the local Aboriginal groups to become resentful.

At Koorliatto Creek several groups of Aboriginal people tried unsuccessfully to move them on, at one point offering to show them the track to find Burke. One man was so impressive and courteous that Wright gave him a cap and shirt and from then on he was named "Mr Shirt". These visits became a regular occurrence.

"Bands often visited the camp, signifying the ground to be theirs, and ordering us to move away. All these demonstrations, in the present state of my party, gave me much anxiety, and I felt anxious to obtain additional stores for recruiting the sick and effectually supplying the advance party. I instructed Mr Hodgkinson, therefore to start for Menindie on the 18th instant, with Belooch and seven of the camels, to escort Mr Becker and Purcell to that township, and having engaged two men in their places, to return as quickly as possible with stores".

At Poria Creek (southeast of Bulloo on the QLD border side) Wright reflected: "During the period included between the above dates (between 21 and 26 March) I spelled the party at the creek, hoping that the men would in some degree regain their health. I regret to state, however, that I had little reason to congratulate myself upon the results. Mr Becker and Purcell became much worse and utterly unable to walk about, and Smith and Stone did not at all improve, though energetically discharging their respective duties ".

Despite the availability of good water supplies and fresh food members of the party continued to weaken. Wright recorded on Friday 5 April to Wednesday 17 April that:

"Trying to locate Cooper's Creek. I found Bulloo watercourse to consist of a large sheet of water, extending some five miles to the north of our camp... Fish of a considerable size were caught by the party; and at the northern termination of the waterhole, where the creek branched with insignificant channels, numbers of ingeniously constructed fishing dams showed that the natives derived a considerable sustenance from its waters".

On 22 April Wright's diary records that a group of Aboriginal people at Bulloo were becoming increasingly hostile in their attempts to move the explorers on from their campground: "violently gesticulating, making signs that they were hungry, and that we were camped upon their ground', disturbing their tents and medicine supplies, throwing boomerangs carelessly upon the ground near his brother warriors. Throughout this scene Stone, though dying, behaved with great intrepidity, raising himself upon his bed and aiming his revolver at the natives when they approached him".

Stone died that evening and was buried near the camp and Purcell died the following day, the doctor noting "For some days past he had been so weak as to faint after drinking a little water, and we had long been expecting his decease".

Wright's diary entry on 27 April records a "skirmish" at Koorliatto Creek in which Mr Shirt and one other were severely wounded.

About eleven o'clock the cry of "natives!" started us to our feet...a body of natives, numbering between forty and fifty, could be seen advancing towards us from the west.... I saw plainly that they meant mischief, as they were all painted, and bore more spears than we had seen on any former occasion... they quickened their pace into a run, exciting each other with war cries.... "Shirt," accompanied by two other leaders, was in the van, and despite all my motions for them to stop, had approached within a few yards of us before I gave the order to fire ".

Wright at this point "resolved to quit Bulloo immediately".

At the end of April Brahe's party stumbled upon the survivors of Wright's party and joined his camp. After resting for several days Brahe and Wright decided to return to Fort Wills in the hope that Burke's party may have returned. They arrived at the depot on 8 May but incredibly they did not check the buried cache of goods near the Dig Tree, and failed to notice any sign that Burke's party had recently returned to the camp.

On their return, they found Patten was extremely ill and McDonough was limping from a damaged knee, and horses and camels were lost. On 1 May the party, now consisting of 9 expedition members, 21 horses and 16 camels, departed Bulloo for the Darling River and their journey home. They stopped at Koorliatto Creek camp site to the give the invalids and animals an opportunity to recuperate and to construct a suitable bed to transport Patten. As they slowly trundled southwards the group continued to meet and barter with Aboriginal people along the track. "I several times met a small body of natives, camped down the creek, and presented them with a tomahawk in return for some fish which they gave me". On 13 June Wright notes at Tirltawinge south of Torowoto: "The natives remained near us, and were very solicitous to assist us".

The deep sense of duty and honour entrenched in the men, as they surely feared for their health and their lives seems incongruous in hindsight. Wright's diary on 15 June notes:

I had the honor, on the Friday following, to despatch Mr Brahe with a summary of this diary, and Mr Burke's despatches, addressed to the Committee, and I trust that the celerity with which I forward the messenger will be sufficient excuse for its imperfect compilation and clerical deficiencies".

Around 19 June Wright and Brahe, who had gone on ahead with the horses, again met friendly Aborigines "who were overjoyed to see the party again" leading them to an excellent water hole. These were the Aboriginal people who Dr Beckler, Belooch and Peter had met during their first trip to Torowoto in search of trooper Lyons and McPherson. Dr Beckler recorded:

The natives, to whom we gave plenty of flour, sugar, tea and meat, made their camp very close to ours and laughed and ate noisily through half the night....The Wonamente natives had such trust in us that a lad who showed a desire to come with us was allowed to do so.

==== Burke and Wills' final days ====
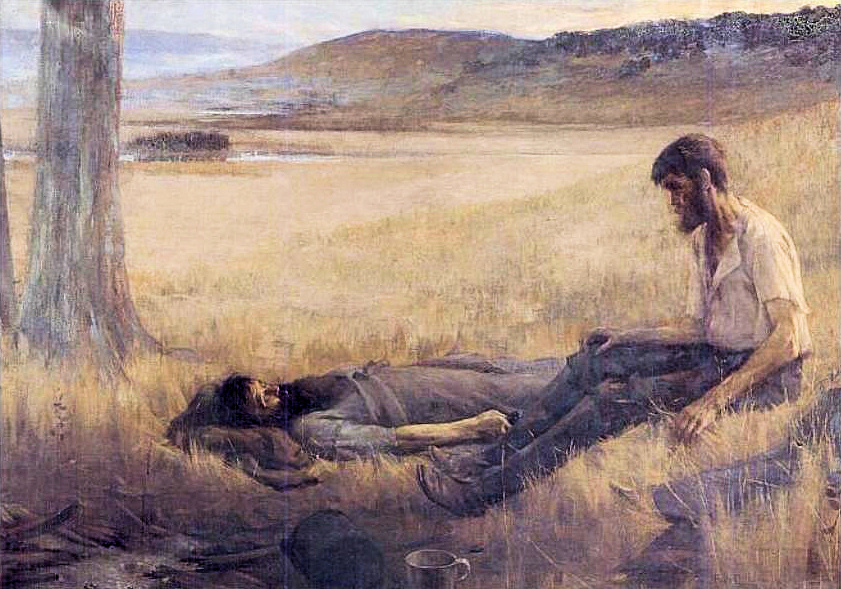
"Death of Burke", by Artur Loureiro, 1892

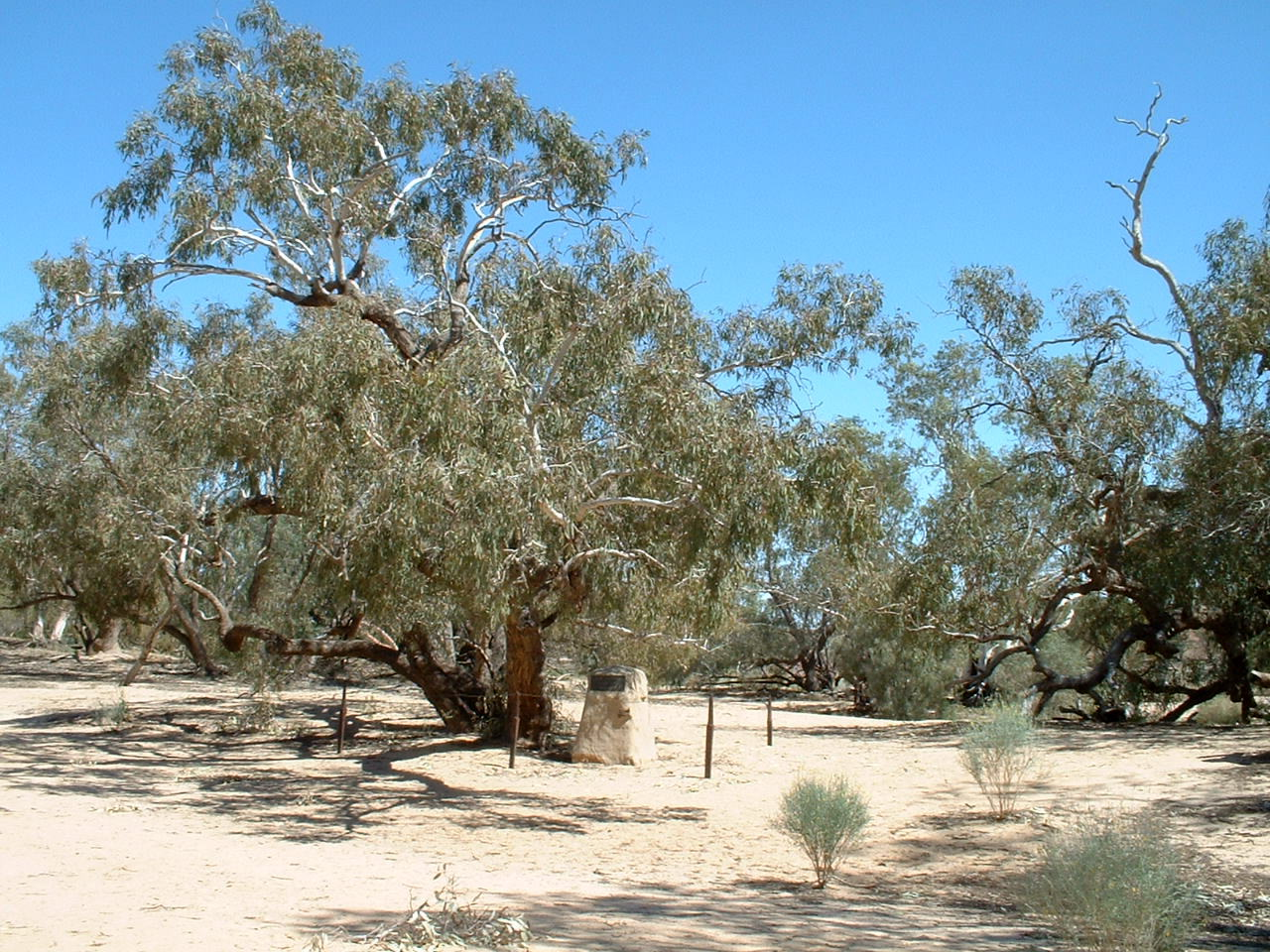
Site of Burke's death

As the explorers wandered along the outlets of the Cooper Creek, Wills and King began to observe and even attempted to learn from the Yandruwandha. Wills began a list of words, King communicated over food-gathering and shelter. Even in Burke's final days however he remained suspicious and hostile to the Aboriginal people, attacking Aboriginal men carrying gifts of fish in nets. Despite such provocations, the Yandruwandha continued to act in a measured way towards the Europeans.

The extreme conditions encountered by the explorers in the outback together with their failing health eventually resulted in the deaths of Burke and Wills. On 26 June 1861 Wills became severely ill; his rapidly declining condition caused Burke and King to travel up the Cooper Creek "to look for the blacks - it is the only chance we have of being saved from starvation".

Burke and King searched for the Aboriginal people for two days before Burke became ill. Burke died on the Cooper Creek around 30 June 1861. At his request, he was left unburied by King who returned to Wills. King discovered Wills' body and once again set out in search of the local Aboriginal people. His life was now in their hands. King recorded that:

They appeared to feel great compassion for me when they understood that I was alone on the creek, and gave me plenty to eat; after being four days with them I saw that they were becoming tired of me, and they made signs that they were going up the creek and that I had better go downwards, but I pretended not to understand them. The same day they shifted camp, and I followed them, and on reaching their camp I shot some crows, which pleased them so much that they made me a breakwind in the centre of their camp, and came and sat round me until such time as the crows were cooked, when they assisted me to eat them.

King lived at Cooper Creek under the care of the Yandruwandha for around three months until he was discovered by Edwin Welch, a member of Alfred Howitt's relief party on 15 September 1861. King was cared for by the Yandruwandha. He received daily rations of nardoo, and sometimes fish, and repaid their efforts by shooting birds for them. John King died at St Kilda on 15 January 1872. He never fully regained his health and died at the relatively young age of 33.

=== The Relief Expeditions ===
The disappearance of the explorers was beginning to cause considerable anxiety in Victoria. Wills' father and Burke's love interest, Julia Matthews, lobbied the Exploration Committee to organise a search and rescue mission. Four relief parties were launched from across the country. These expeditions were successful in both determining the fate of the members of the Burke and Wills Expedition and unlocking vast areas of land for pastoralism. Their achievements would not have been possible without the assistance they received from Aboriginal people.

The first relief party, the Victorian Relief Expedition, was formed in Melbourne by the Royal Society of Victoria and led by Alfred Howitt. The second, the South Australian Burke Relief Expedition, was formed in Adelaide and led by John McKinlay. The Exploration Committee of the Royal Society of Victoria appointed Frederick Walker to lead a third party of 12 men from Rockhampton along the Barcoo and Thomson rivers to the Norman River, then to the Gulf of Carpentaria to meet Commander Norman and H.C.MS steamship Victoria. The fourth relief party was led by William Landsborough. The Landsborough party travelled from Brisbane aboard the Firefly which took them to the Gulf of Carpentaria.

These expeditions had a covert goal of scouting for grazing land and in the process of searching for the Burke and Wills Expedition, they explored thousands of kilometres of Queensland and South Australia. They unequivocally established the suitability of grazing in the Cooper basin and Western Queensland and caused a surge of pastoral expansion into these regions.

==== The Victorian Relief Expedition (Howitt) ====
Alfred Howitt was a seasoned explorer who had previously travelled to the Cooper Creek area. Brahe accompanied Howitt's party and they reached the Cooper in less than four weeks. On the way the party set up camp at a place Howitt named Callyamurra, from the Aboriginal name Kaliumaru or "wide lake". Callyamurra was a splendid waterhole, teaming with birds and circled with rocks carved with sacred Aboriginal symbols. These showed that it was an important place of ceremony for the Yandruwandha and other tribes such as the Wangkamurra and Yawarrawarrka.

Howitt's prompt arrival at Cooper Creek was due in large part to the assistance he received from Aboriginal groups and guides, including two named Sandy and Frank who were recruited at Menindee. As the party made its way to Cooper Creek and beyond, Howitt noted they traversed the territories of three distinct language groups, each with its own system of managing and monitoring strangers.

This was not a party of European men traversing the unknown - this was a group of strangers being stewarded through a landscape, being shown where to camp and how to sustain themselves.

Their investigations of Fort Wills did not reveal any clues as to the fate of the missing men; they also failed to check the Dig Tree. On 15 September 1861, a member of Howitt's party, a surveyor named Edwin Welch found King living with the Yandruwandha.

Looking at carelessly that the natives ahead, to whom we were gradually approaching, I was startled at observing what appeared to be a white man come from amongst them, although had it not been for the hat, it might still have been mistaken for an aboriginal as many of them had obtained old clothes at the depot. The hat convinced me it was a white man, and giving my horse his head I dashed down and the bank towards him, where he fell on his knees on the sand for a few moments in the attitude of prayer. On a rising I hardly asked "who in the name of wonder are you?" And received the reply "I am King, sir, the last man of the exploring expedition."

Howitt's Aboriginal guides, Sandy and Frank, ran back to Howitt's camp with the amazing news. King was carried back to Callyamurra followed by some of his Aboriginal hosts who were "overjoyed he had been reunited with his companions and stood around the camp with a most gratified and delighted expression".

King led Howitt to Wills' grave site where they reburied his remains and made an inscription on a nearby tree. Burke was then buried. Once King was well enough to travel, Howitt decided to return southward but would not leave without registering his gratitude to the Aboriginal people Howitt's diary entry of 24 September 1861 notes:

Two days after we camped here the natives left and have not been seen since. I could not think of leaving without showing them that we could appreciate and reward the kindness they had shown to Burke's party and particularly to King...They left, making signs expressive of friendship, carrying their presents with them.

On 1 March at Camp 32 (Cooper Creek) Howitt records:

Returned today, keeping much the same course, but nearer the creek over a succession of very rotten flats, timbered with box. Had a vociferous leave taking with our black friends, who have promised to wait four 'sleeps' until I return.

On 27 March at Camp 44:

Our guides from lake Hope remained at the native camp at Perodinna, and a blackfellow who was out with McKinlay, named Boulin-ganne, accompanied us this morning. He says that the water on McKinlay's route is now dry. Four other natives accompanied our guide.

At Camp 47 on 30 March Howitt again changes his Aboriginal guides as he moves across new Aboriginal country.

Left our guide Boulin-ganne with the Cudgee-gudgenee blacks... and took on a native belonging to the lower end of Cooper's Creek". On 10 July "About eleven o'clock came in sight of a good deal of stunted timber... and this our Kyejerou black, Tommy, pronounced to be the creek.

Howitt's diary of 1 October:

halted above our 27th camp, at a number of water holes, where there was pretty good feed. Passed our black friends on the road who invited us to stop and eat fish and nardoo, and have a Corroborree.... When we arrived... only the lubras and piccaninnies were at home... They began to pack up their things for a flight; but an amicable understanding being brought about, and some of the men returning, we were soon the best of friends. I distributed the few remaining presents, and they gave in return, some chewed pitchery (pituri) and nardoo balls.

On their return to Melbourne Howitt's party passed through Fort Wills. He finally discovered the cache of journals, documents and maps hidden near the Dig Tree.

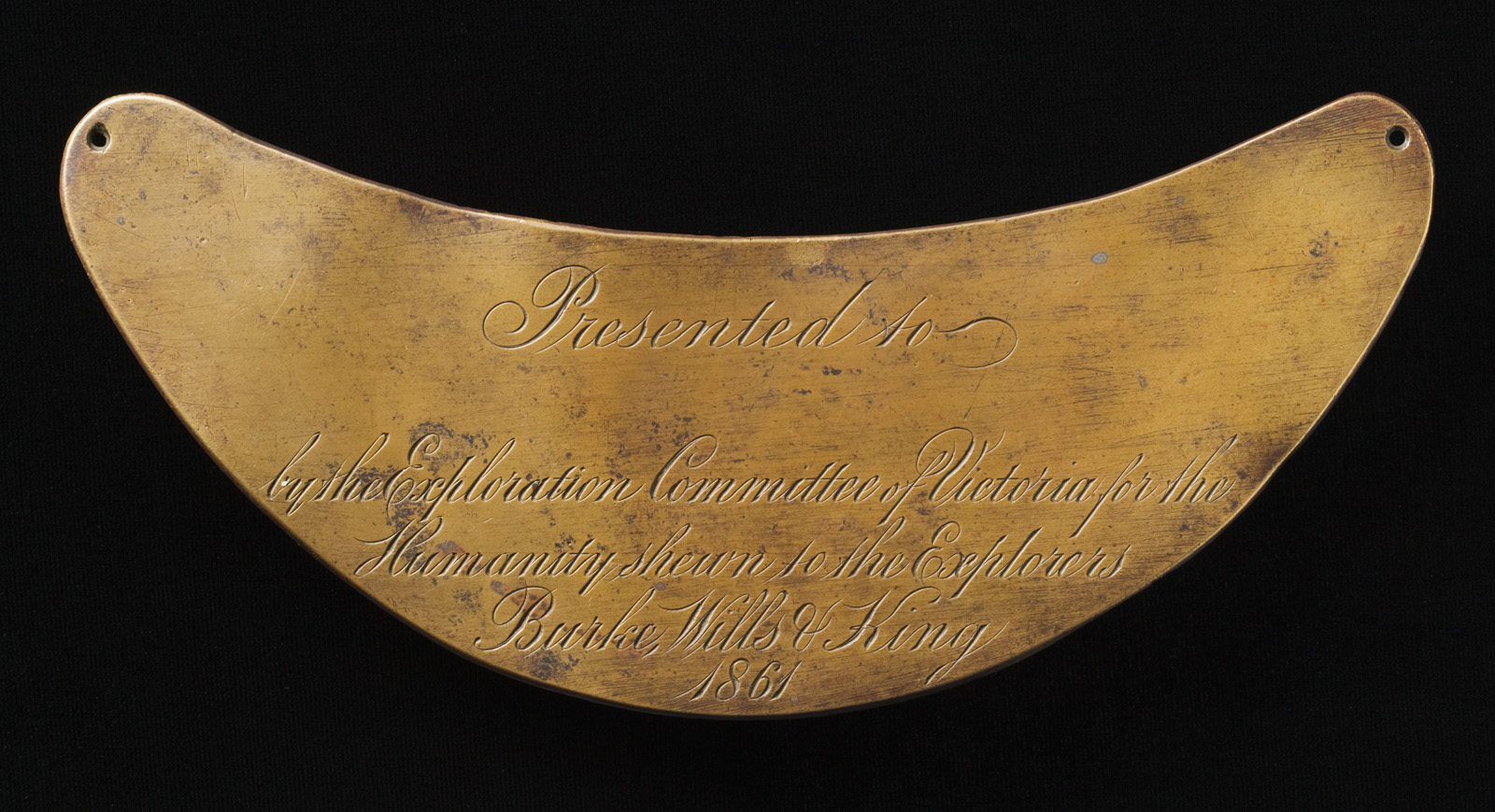
One of the breastplates

Howitt's diaries warmly acknowledged the debts he and King owed to Aboriginal people. He requested that the Exploration Committee produce a series of breastplates. These were inscribed with gratitude "for the Humanity shewn to the Explorers Burke, Wills and King 1861". The breastplates were presented to the Yandruwandha by Howitt on his next expedition to Cooper Creek when he was tasked with retrieving the bodies of Burke and Wills.

Howitt's diaries were published in the colonial press over the next six months; settlers noted with surprise how easily Howitt moved through a landscape that had so challenged Burke and Wills. Howitt's party comfortably crossed racial and geographic frontiers and were able to locate both King and the bodies of Burke and Wills. Howitt's journals record numerous examples of his engagement with various Aboriginal communities, and acknowledgement of the value of Aboriginal knowledge.

At times the Aboriginal conventions of stewardship assisted Howitt's party to find places to camp. On his second Expedition to retrieve the explorers' remains Howitt's party was guided to a "camp of natives... (who) were first much alarmed, but became friendly - pointing out a place for us to camp and sending down an wooden bowl of seed". In early October, Howitt's party encountered another group of Aboriginal people. The two groups soon came:

...to a friendly understanding by means of a few words I knew... a jolly-looking young fellow... took the lead... I was very much amused at the ceremonious way in which my guide led the way, pointing out the best road and very earnestly making me notice the bushes in my way.

The tragedy of the Burke and Will Expedition fuelled a wave of pride and patriotism in Victoria. King returned to Melbourne a hero and was subjected to much unwanted fanfare. His emotional state precluded him from participating in many of the celebrations. Burke was elevated to the status of a martyr though this may have been a diversionary tactic employed to avert attention from his and the Exploration Committee's obvious failings. On retrieving the remains of Burke and Wills, Howitt transported them to Melbourne where they received Victoria's first state funeral and had a memorial erected in their honour. The public's fascination with the expedition was demonstrated when approximately 80% of Melbourne's population attended the state funeral to view the explorers' remains and to honour their deaths. A Royal Commission into the Expedition commenced towards the end of 1861. The commission apportioned a large amount of blame on Burke's leadership and the decisions he made. The Exploration Committee were also heavily criticised. Brahe and Wright were used as scapegoats and accused of a dereliction of duties.

==== The Landsborough Expedition ====
On 14 August 1861, the Firefly set sail from Brisbane and delivered William Landsborough and his party to the mouth of the Albert River in the Gulf of Carpentaria. They travelled southwards along the Gregory River and across the Barkly Plains and later to Menindee but failed to find a trace of the Burke and Wills party. The Landsborough Expedition party successfully travelled all the way from the Gulf of Carpentaria to Victoria. Jemmy, Fisherman and Jackey, the Aboriginal people involved with Landsborough's Expedition, not only guided the non-Aboriginal explorers through their country, they also fed and watered them. They were vital contributors to the experiences that became stories of colonial exploration and settlement. Landsborough was heavily criticised for prioritising the discovery of grazing land over locating the Burke and Wills party.

==== The South Australian Burke Relief Expedition ====
The South Australian Government directed John McKinlay and his party to travel to the Cooper and continue northwards in search of Burke and Wills. They travelled through Yauraworka (Yandruwandha Yawarrawarrka) territory across the Cooper flood plains and discovered a rudimentary grave at Lake Kadhi-baerri which was not in the customary style of an aboriginal burial site. Careful excavation of the site and an artefact scatter led McKinlay to believe that this grave was associated with the Burke and Wills party. He named the site Lake Massacre and interviewed a local Aboriginal man who informed him that the man, who was thought to be Gray, had been killed with a semi-circular sword used by Aboriginal people. McKinlay dispatched his second-in-command, W.L. Hodgkinson to the outposted settlement at Blanchewater to advise the authorities of his discoveries. Upon his return, Hodgkinson informed McKinlay that Howitt had found King and the remains of Burke and Wills. McKinlay was satisfied that he had fulfilled his obligations and proceeded to embark on a search for grazing land. McKinlay travelled north from the Innamincka region and discovered a number of lakes which he named Lake Hodgkinson, Lake Blanche and Lake Sir Richard, after the then South Australian Governor and his wife. From there McKinlay travelled to the Diamantina flood zone near Birdsville. McKinlay discovered large tracts of land that would support the grazing industry. His reports supported the conclusions made by Burke and Wills and Stuart; that travelling, grazing and droving in central Australia and across the continent were possible.

==== The Victorian Relief Expedition (Walker) ====
Fredrick Walker was a bushman of considerable talent and had been credited for opening up substantial areas in central for Queensland for pastoralism. Walker's relief expedition commenced from Rockhampton in September 1861. Walker discovered camel tracks near the Flinders River which he believed were made by the Burke and Wills party. He followed the tracks until they disappeared but failed to find any further traces of the missing party.

=== Cooper Droving, Pastoralism and Pastoral Settlement ===
Burke and Wills and subsequent explorers opened up the central arid lands to European pastoralists and adventurers. The Birdsville and Strzelecki Tracks, among other remote tracks, quickly became used as stock routes for overlanding sheep and cattle from the centre of Australia to southern markets. The tracks were utilised as primary transport corridors across the north-east of South Australia, to the east of Lake Eyre and connected the former railhead at Marree to the Channel Country of south-western Queensland.

The discovery of high quality grazing land following the expeditions of Stuart, Burke and Wills and the rescue parties led to a surge in the pastoral settlement of the Birdsville and Strzelecki Tracks region. The Birdsville and Strzelecki Tracks became the principal droving routes into and through the region.

In 1873 John Conrick and Robert Bostock, encouraged by the positive reports of explorers, became the first permanent settlers in the region. Bostock and Conrick took up properties near the waterholes of the Innamincka "choke", naming them Innamincka and Nappa Merrie respectively. They registered their leases at the Queensland Lands Office in Charleville. When government surveyors reached the region in 1879, Bostock discovered that Innamincka was actually located in South Australia and that he had been paying the wrong government for six years. Bostock abandoned Innamincka because the regulatory conditions imposed by South Australia were more onerous than in Queensland. Conrick built on the journeys of Gregory and Redford and with the assistance of local Aboriginal people was able to establish the Strzelecki Track as a recognised stock route.

=== Afghan Cameleers ===
Camels and their handlers transported supplies for Australian explorers, pastoralists and early settlers and consequently played an important role in the development of life along the Birdsville and Strzelecki Tracks. The cameleers came from Afghanistan, Baluchistan and other regions of north-western India (now Pakistan). From the 1860s to the 1920s 20,000 camels and 2000 cameleers came to Australia. Camels had many advantages over horses which were the traditional transportation choice for explorers and pastoralists. Camels were well suited to the Australian climate and were able to carry much heavier loads than horses. Camels required less water and could subsist on a wide variety of naturally occurring plants whereas horses required high-energy foods such as oats.

The first camels to be imported in significant numbers to Australia were for the Burke and Wills Expedition. The subsequent relief parties led by Howitt, McKinlay, Landsborough and Walker explored and mapped large parts of Australia with the help of camels. The camels' value quickly became apparent as they outperformed horses in the difficult desert conditions.

From the 1920s motorised vehicles became increasingly popular in Australia. Trucks and cars began to usurp the transportation role of camels. Surveyors and police officers continued to use camels for some time but as their numbers began to grow they became considered by many as a feral pest. Some of the cameleers remained in Marree and performed a variety of jobs while others sought their fortunes in larger cities or returned home.

== Description ==
The Burke, Wills, King and Yandruwandha National Heritage Place is at an area of approximately 61ha, 240 km SE of Birdsville and 290 km SW of Windorah, comprising five circles each of 50 metre radius, and connected by a 10 metre wide corridor following the approximate location of the Cooper Creek watercourse.

The five sites that constitute the Burke and Wills Expedition Sites are located in a corridor that stretches for approximately 70 kilometres and traces the banks of Cooper Creek through South Australia and Queensland. The five expedition sites and the corridor cover an area of 61 hectares. Four of the sites are in South Australia and are separated by a distance of approximately 30 kilometres: Will's Site, King's Site, Burke's Tree and Howitt's Site. These four sites are situated within the Innamincka/Cooper Creek State Heritage Area and the broader Innamincka Regional Reserve, which covers an area of 1.3 million hectares. The Dig Tree and Fort Wills Site is located in Queensland and is approximately 40 kilometres from the nearest South Australian site, Howitt's Site. The Dig Tree and Fort Wills Site is located within land classified as a reserve for memorial purposes. The surrounding environment is arid semi-arid and contains a variety of landscape types from gibber plains to thriving wetlands fed by the waters of Cooper Creek system. The gibber plains have sparse vegetation dominated by Mitchell-grass and other grasses and herbs. The wetlands are dominated by Northern River Red Gums and Coolabah species.

=== The Dig Tree and Fort Wills Site ===
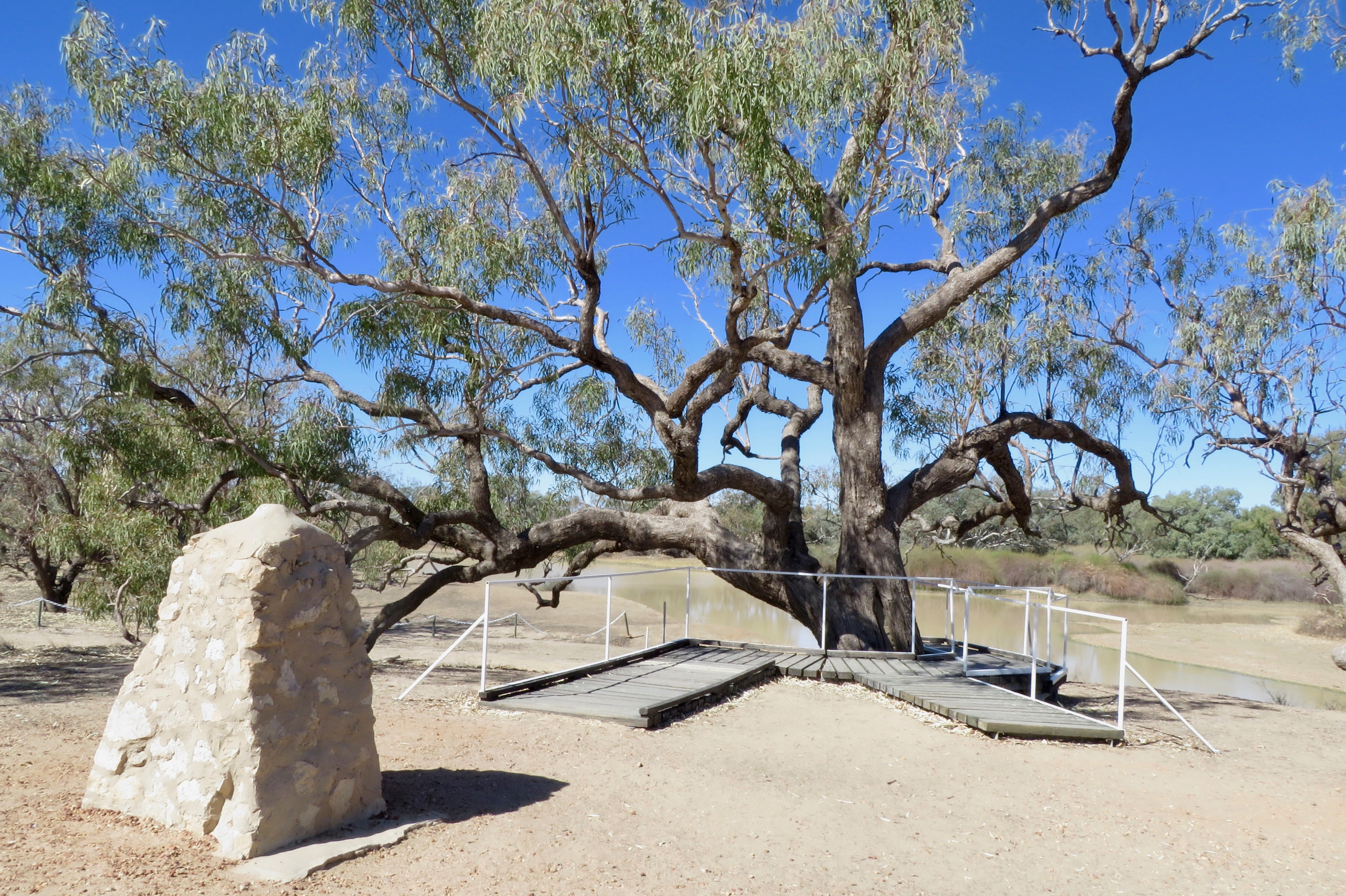
The Dig Tree, 2014

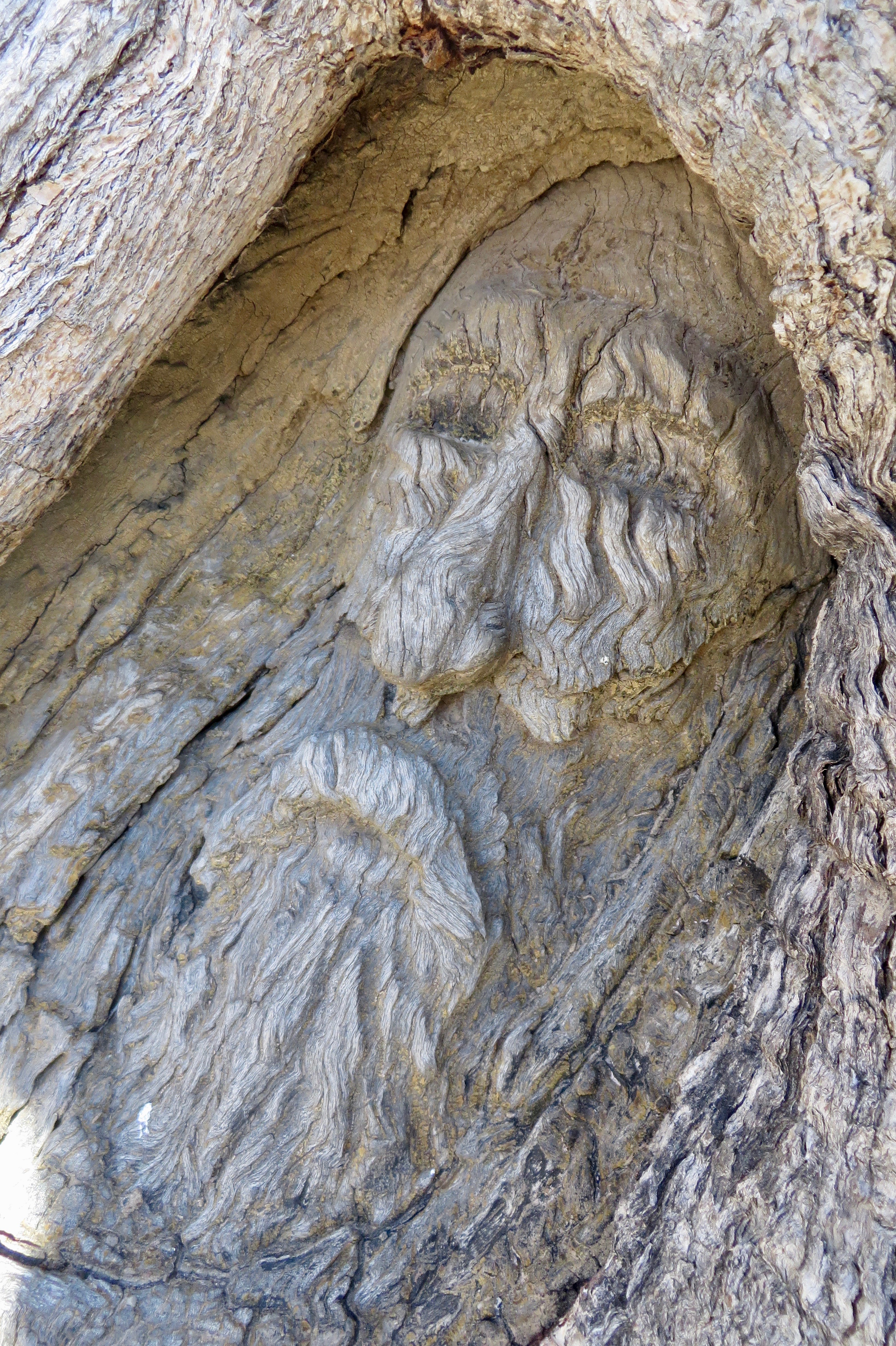
The Face Tree, 2014

The Dig Tree and Fort Wills Site is approximately 60 x 70 meters in size. The site is 6 kilometres from Nappa Merrie homestead and 68 kilometres from Innamincka. The Dig Tree and Fort Wills Site is gazetted as a Memorial Reserve and is managed by the Royal Historical Society of Queensland. A small interpretation shed and toilet block are located at the entrance to the site. The site contains two marked trees, two stone cairns, interpretation signs and a modern hut and is sectioned off with white chain fencing. The Dig Tree is a 200-250 year old spreading Coolabah (Eucalyptus microtheca). Three inscriptions are thought to have been inscribed on the tree. On the creek side of the trunk an inscription B LXV made by William Brahe denotes the 65th camp from Melbourne and the B is thought to refer to either "Burke" or "Brahe" On an upstream-side limb the words DEC 6.60 APR 21.61 were blazed on the tree to mark the date of the establishment and abandonment of the camp. On the northern side of the trunk an inscription notifying Burke, Wills and King of a buried cache of supplies has been subject to fierce debate and controversy over the years. Numerous variations about the exact wording of the inscription exist and include: DIG 9 FT W APR 21; AH DIG under.; DIG under 40FT W; DIG 3 ft NW; DIG 3 FT. N.W. APR. 21 1861; DIG UNDER 3 FT NW, DIG under. It has also been suggested that the "dig" inscription was added in 1862 by Alexander Aitken, a member of Alfred Howitt's expedition party that was travelling to Cooper Creek to retrieve the bodies of Burke and Wills. Another account of the "dig" inscription suggests that the blaze was made on an entirely different tree, to the south of the "dig" tree. The possibility that the "dig" inscription was blazed on a separate tree is supported by evidence given by William Brahe and John King at a Commission of Enquiry into the expedition. The inscriptions have been obscured over time by regrowth. The Face Tree (Eucalyptus microtheca) is located approximately 25 metres east of the Dig Tree. It portrays a rendition of the face of Robert O'Hara Burke and the letters ROB. A boardwalk has been constructed around the Dig Tree and Face Tree to prevent the trees being disturbed by visitors. Fort Wills is located on the northern bank of the Bulloo waterhole. The Dig Tree and the Face Tree are encompassed within the larger Fort Wills Site.

=== Howitt's Site ===
The true location of Howitt's Site, the place from where Howitt subsequently discovered John King, is subject to debate. A body of evidence suggests that the site marked with a cairn is actually the location of one of Howitt's campsites during his 1862 expedition to retrieve the bodies of Burke and Wills. This information was confirmed by personal communication with a member of the Burke and Wills Historical Society. The description below provides details on the site that is often referred to in popular literature. Howitt's camp site is located on the eastern bank of the Callyamurra waterhole and is approximately 40 kilometres from the Dig Tree and Fort Wills Site. The site has been marked with a cairn.

=== Burke's Tree ===
The Burke's Tree site is approximately 4 x 7 metres in size and is located 9 kilometres northeast of Innamincka and 10 kilometres from Howitt's Site. The site is accessed by a nature trail that extends for 300 metres from a car park and has a number of interpretative signs at various points. The site is 100 metres from the creek bed and contains a Coolabah tree (Eucalyptus microtheca) that marks the original gravesite of Robert O'Hara Burke and a memorial plinth that reads Robert O'Hara Burke died here 28 June 1861. The tree and plinth are surrounded by a low metal chain fence. John McKinlay visited the grave site on 7 December 1861 and blazed his conjoined initials MK into the trunk and the word DIG to indicate a buried bottle containing a note he had written. Burke's Tree is subject to deposition from flooding and the ground level has gradually risen after each flood event and the inscriptions are no longer visible.

=== King's Site ===
King's Site is approximately 8 kilometres west of Innamincka and 10 kilometres from Burke's Tree. The site is accessed via a nature trail that extends 150 metres from a car park and is 165 metres from the creek bed. The site contains a stone plinth between two trees; a blazed tree is located behind the plinth. The stone plinth was erected in 1973 and reads John King Born County Tyrone N.Ireland 5-12-1838 Died Melbourne 1872 of the Burke and Wills Exploring Expedition was rescued 15-9-1861 in nearby creek by EJ Welch of the relief party of AW Howitt who established camp 32 in this vicinity. Erected 1-9-1973 by the Mack and Lofler Families Walkerie SA. In 1948 a nearby tree was blazed with the word KING. The tree has been reduced to a height of approximately 1.5 metres and has a concrete footing with a metal rod running through its hollow centre.

=== Wills' Site ===
The true location of Wills' Site, the place where William John Wills died, is subject to debate. A body of evidence exists that suggests that Wills' original resting place is actually located two kilometres downstream from the place that is currently recognised as the place where he died, confirmed by personal communication with a member of the Burke and Wills Historical Society. The description below provides details on the site that is often referred to in popular literature.

Wills' Site is located 20 kilometres west of Innamincka and 10 kilometres from King's Site.

The site is where Howitt's relief party found and buried the body of William John Wills. The site is approximately 5 x 5 metres in size and contains a stone plinth surrounded by three mature trees and an interpretative sign. Howitt blazed an inscription on a nearby tree that read W J WILLS XLV YDS NNW AH. In 1947 or 1948 a Queensland grazier named Alfred Cory Towner blazed another tree with the inscription WILLS 1861 and erected a pipe nearby with the words WILLS DIED IN CREEK 1861. In 1996 sand and stones were placed around the pipe to protect it from damage. A cairn was erected at the site in 1973.

== Condition ==
The five sites that constitute the Burke and Wills Expedition Sites were the scene for some of the most dramatic events associated with the exploration of Australia. These events occurred more than 150 years ago and much of the physical fabric from the sites has disappeared through natural events such as flooding as well as vandalism and souveniring. The five individual sites within the place are all professionally managed as historic sites and are afforded protection under various pieces of state legislation.

=== The Dig Tree and Fort Wills ===
The Dig Tree has been treated for pests and diseases by a professional tree surgeon from the Queensland Department of Primary Industry and is in good condition. Cement has been inserted on one side of the base of the tree for stabilisation purposes. The inscriptions have been obscured over time by regrowth and the only clearly remaining blaze is LXV. The broader site is in good condition. Boardwalks have been placed around the two trees to minimise soil compaction and the potential impacts of tourists.

=== Howitt's Site ===
The site is generally in good condition.

=== Burke's Tree ===
The site is in good condition. The tree appears generally healthy; one of the large tree branches is resting on the metal chain fence that surrounds the site and may break off in the future. The stone plinth has been scratched with graffiti. At least five pieces of Burke's Tree have been removed over the years; two of these pieces are currently in the possession of the Royal Geographical Society of Australasia (SA Branch).

=== King's Site ===
The site is generally in good condition. The King blaze in the tree is clearly visible however a large crack has obscured the inscription.

=== Wills' Site ===
Wills' site is generally in good condition. The plinth has some water damage and a branch of one of the surrounding trees is overhanging the plinth.

== Heritage listing ==
The five Burke and Wills Expedition Sites (the Dig Tree and Fort Wills Site, Burke's Tree, Wills' Site, King's Site and Howitt's Site) have outstanding heritage value to the nation as the setting for the key events associated with the Burke and Wills Expedition, which was a defining moment in Australia's cultural history. The expedition of 1860 - 1861 was the first to cross the continent from south to north, which, along with the subsequent relief parties facilitated further exploration of an enormous area of the outback. The Burke and Wills Expedition and those of the subsequent relief parties contributed to the development of Australia's grazing industry and informed the process of pastoral settlement across the country. The expedition played a significant role in the redefinition of Australia's geopolitical landscape and identification of areas habitable by Europeans in the outback.

The Burke and Wills Expedition provides an outstanding example of the processes associated with early European exploration of Australia. The aims of the expedition cover the breadth of factors that motivated exploration in the 19th century and demonstrate a common theme in the field of exploration whereby individual expeditions, often composed of many men, are remembered and named exclusively after the leaders that commanded them.

The Burke and Wills Expedition provides important insights into the 19th century European attitude towards the Australian environment and its Indigenous peoples. The expedition is a rare example of a large-scale expedition that relied substantially on public subscriptions for funding.

The expedition resulted in the loss of seven lives including those of Burke and Wills. The story of the expedition has captured the imagination of successive generations of Australians over the past 150 years and has been transformed into a "national myth of heroic endeavour" that has played a formative role in the development of Australia's national character.

The Burke and Wills Expedition Sites, which lie on Yandruwandha-Yawarrawarrka country and Wongkumara country, connect contemporary Australians with the expedition's key figures: Robert Burke, William Wills, John King, Alfred Howitt and the assistance provided to them by the Yandruwandha Aboriginal people. Burke and Wills were the leaders of the expedition; it was their leadership and the decisions they made that had a major impact on the expedition, its aftermath and the transformation of the story into an iconic moment in Australia's cultural history. John King was the sole survivor of the party of four that made the historic journey to the Gulf of Carpentaria. He is remembered for his survival through connection with the Yandruwandha people who cared for him until he was rescued by Alfred Howitt. Alfred Howitt played a pivotal role in the story of the Burke and Wills Expedition through his rescue of John King. Howitt recorded the name of the Yandruwandha people who, in King's words, had treated him as one of their own over the months following the deaths of Burke and Wills.

The Burke, Wills, King and Yandruwandha National Heritage Place was listed on the Australian National Heritage List on 22 January 2016 having satisfied the following criteria.

Criterion A: Events, Processes

The five individual locations that constitute the Burke and Wills Expedition Sites (the Dig Tree and Fort Wills Site, Howitt's Site, Burke's Tree, King's Site and Wills' Site) have outstanding heritage value to the nation as the major setting of the Burke and Wills Expedition. The Burke and Wills Expedition was a watershed event that led to the extensive exploration of the Australian outback and the spread of pastoral settlement across the country. Significant areas of grazing land were opened up as a result of the Burke and Wills Expedition and those of the subsequent relief parties. The expeditions by Burke and Wills, their rival John McDouall Stuart, and the relief-parties including Alfred Howitt, John McKinlay, William Landsborough and Frederick Walker, altered Australia's geopolitical landscape through the annexation of the area known today as the Northern Territory by South Australia and the extension of Queensland's territorial boundary westward from 141º to 138 º longitude. The Burke and Wills Expedition traversed the length of the country; however the events that unfolded, primarily in Yandruwandha Aboriginal country, are significant in the context of the dominant 19th century European attitudes towards Aboriginal people. Whereas Burke had been suspicious of the Yandruwandha's interest in the party and kept them at a safe distance, he, Wills and King became increasingly dependent on contact with the Yandruwandha as their situation worsened. After Burke and Wills died, John King followed the movements of Yandruwandha and lived with them until he was found by Howitt.

The Dig Tree and Fort Wills Site was the location of the tragedy that characterises much of the expedition. The return of Burke, Wills and King to the site marks a significant achievement in the European exploration of the continent but is remembered in popular consciousness for their arrival only hours after their comrades who had just departed after waiting for four months. The site contains the DIG inscription that marked the hidden cache of supplies that helped sustain Burke, Wills and King upon their return from the Gulf of Carpentaria. Brahe and Wright failed to realise that the explorers had successfully returned from northern Australia, which was in part attributable to the oversight made by Burke and Wills to not leave a clear message advising of their return to the site. The Dig Tree and Fort Wills Site demarcates a boundary in the outback where Europeans, with their limited knowledge of the Australian environment, could survive.

The Burke's Tree site and the Wills' Site where Burke and Wills respectively died symbolise the harsh and dangerous nature of the outback encountered by 19th century Europeans and are reminders of the key roles of Burke and Wills as leaders of the expedition.

Howitt's Site signifies the attempts made by the rescue parties to find the missing explorers and is closely associated with the place of John King's rescue. The success of Howitt in locating the lone survivor of the small party that travelled to the north coast of Australia demonstrates not only the accomplishments of the relief parties in determining the fate of the Burke and Wills explorers, but their wider achievements in identifying and opening up vast areas of grazing land in South Australia and Queensland. The success of the relief parties must also be viewed in light of the information, guidance and support offered to them by Aboriginal peoples such as the Yandruwandha.

King's Site is important as the place where King was found alive by Alfred Howitt's relief party. King owed his survival to the hospitality of the Yandruwandha people; without their assistance, it is almost certain that he would have suffered the same fate as Burke and Wills. King's Site is an outstanding memorial to the Yandruwandha people's role in the story that was of great significance in colonial times and continues to have iconic importance in Australia's history.

Criterion H: Significant people

The Burke and Wills Expedition Sites have outstanding heritage value to the nation because of their special association with Robert Burke, William Wills, John King, Alfred Howitt and the Yandruwandha people who assisted the expedition.

The Burke and Wills Expedition is one of the most well-known events in Australia's cultural history. Although more than 150 years have transpired since the expedition Australians continue to be fascinated by the drama and tragedy that define the Burke and Wills story. Burke and Wills are at the heart of the story and it was their leadership and decisions that had a major impact on the expedition and its aftermath. Their failure to leave a clear message at the Dig Tree and Fort Wills Site that signalled their successful return from the Gulf of Carpentaria was the catalyst for many of the subsequent events. Burke and Wills exemplify that element of Australia's national character that embraces tragedy and celebrates failure. Their expedition has become a national myth of struggle and survival.

John King was the sole survivor of the small party of four that made the historic journey to the north coast of Australia. The story of King's survival is a testimony to the Yandruwandha people's adaptation to their country, which proved fatally harsh to the explorers. King's survival also highlights the importance of the relief parties within the story and added an extra dimension to the Burke and Wills story that fuelled public interest in the expedition and enabled the Exploration Committee to brand the expedition as a successful venture.

Alfred Howitt was one of Australia's foremost explorers, scientists and anthropologists. His role is integral to the Burke and Wills story as the person who rescued John King, returned the bodies of Burke and Wills to Melbourne and as a representative of all the relief parties that made significant geographic discoveries.

The Yandruwandha people who assisted the expedition were an essential part of the story of the Burke and Wills expedition on Cooper Creek. While cautious and sometimes suspicious about the interest the Yandruwandha took in them, the explorers described how the Yandruwandha were mostly hospitable, and offered them fish and nardoo while receiving small items in exchange. After Burke and Wills died the Yandruwandha accommodated King, signalled his presence to the relief party and located the bodies of Burke and Wills, enabling them to be retrieved. Their role in the story was significant at the time and continues to be an important part of Australia's cultural history.
