= Merty Merty =

Pastoral lease in South Australia

Coordinates: 28°38.26′S 140°14.285′E

Location in South Australia

Merty Merty (also known as Merty Merty Station) is both a pastoral lease that once operated as a cattle station in north east South Australia and a locality. In April 2013, the land occupying the appropriate extent of the pastoral lease was gazetted by the Government of South Australia as a locality under the name Merty Merty.

It is situated about 190 kilometres (118 mi) north west of Tibooburra and 285 kilometres (177 mi) north of Leigh Creek in the outback of South Australia.

The homestead is found along Strzelecki Creek and the Strzelecki Track passes through the property.

== History ==
The station was formed in 1919 after being sub-divided out of Innamincka Station, Tinga Tingana and Strzelecki.

Sidney Kidman acquired the property in 1924 but only grazed cattle there intermittently. Kidman had little faith in the waterholes along the Strzelecki for moving cattle south and during drought would take them via Innamincka and down the Birdsville Track.

The historic Well and Whim, Coochilara Waterhole and the Old Mulga Bore are listed on the South Australian Heritage Register.

== See also ==
- List of ranches and stations
- List of reduplicated Australian place names
