= Strzelecki Creek =

Strzelecki
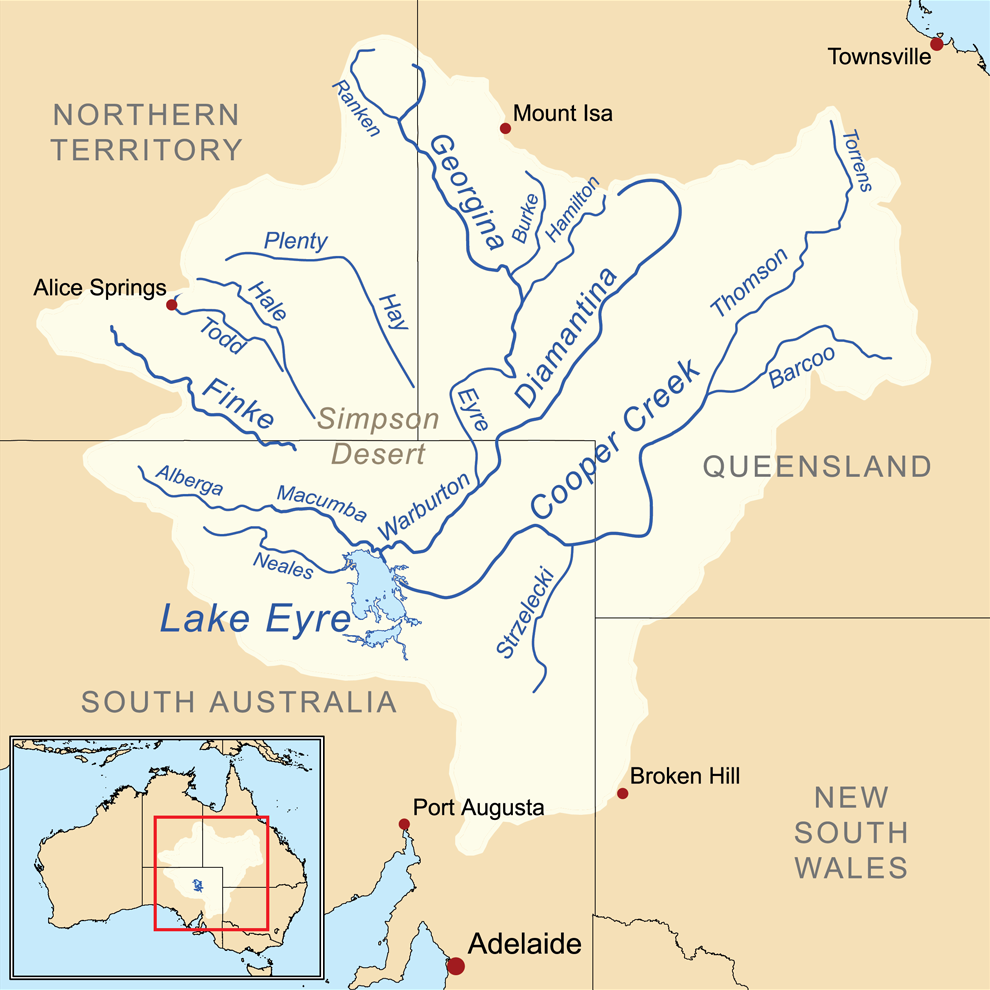
- A map of the Lake Eyre Basin showing the location of Strzelecki Creek

- Location of the river mouth in South Australia
- Etymology: Paul Edmund de Strzelecki

Location
- Country: Australia
- State: South Australia
- Region: Far North
- Municipality: unincorporated area

Physical characteristics
- Source: Cooper Creek
  - location: south of Innamincka
  - elevation: 52 m (171 ft)
- Mouth: Lake Blanche
  - location: west of Montecollina
  - coordinates: 29°21′51″S 139°49′49″E
  - elevation: 1 m (3 ft 3 in)
- Length: 200 km (120 mi)

Basin features
- River system: Lake Eyre Basin
- protected areas: Strzelecki Regional Reserve

The Strzelecki Creek, part of the Lake Eyre basin, is an ephemeral watercourse in the Australian state of South Australia.

== Course and features ==
The Strzelecki is a distributary of Cooper Creek and branches off near the town of Innamincka and flows in a southerly direction thought the Strzelecki Desert for about 200 kilometres (120 mi) towards Lake Blanche. While being feed by the Cooper Creek, it does have its own catchment and can flow independently after "heavy localised storms". Flows on "exceptional" occasions can reach Lakes Blanche, Callabonna, Frome and Gregory. Its watercourse is lined by trees, bordered by "large parallel sand ridges" and includes "a series of waterholes".

Parts of the creek system are within the protected area known as the Strzelecki Regional Reserve. The creek system is also within the boundaries of the non-statutory Strzelecki Desert Lakes Important Bird Area. The former pastoral lease property Tinga Tingana straddled the creek which also passes through Blanchewater Station.

== Etymology ==
It was named by the British explorer, Charles Sturt on 18 August 1845 after Paul Edmund de Strzelecki, the Polish scientist and explorer. Explorer Augustus Charles Gregory and his party found that following Strzelecki Creek proved to be the best way to travel through the interior from the Pacific to the Southern Ocean.

== See also ==
- List of rivers of Australia § South Australia
