= Paweł Strzelecki =

Polish-born explorer of Australia (1797–1873)

Sir Paweł Edmund Strzelecki
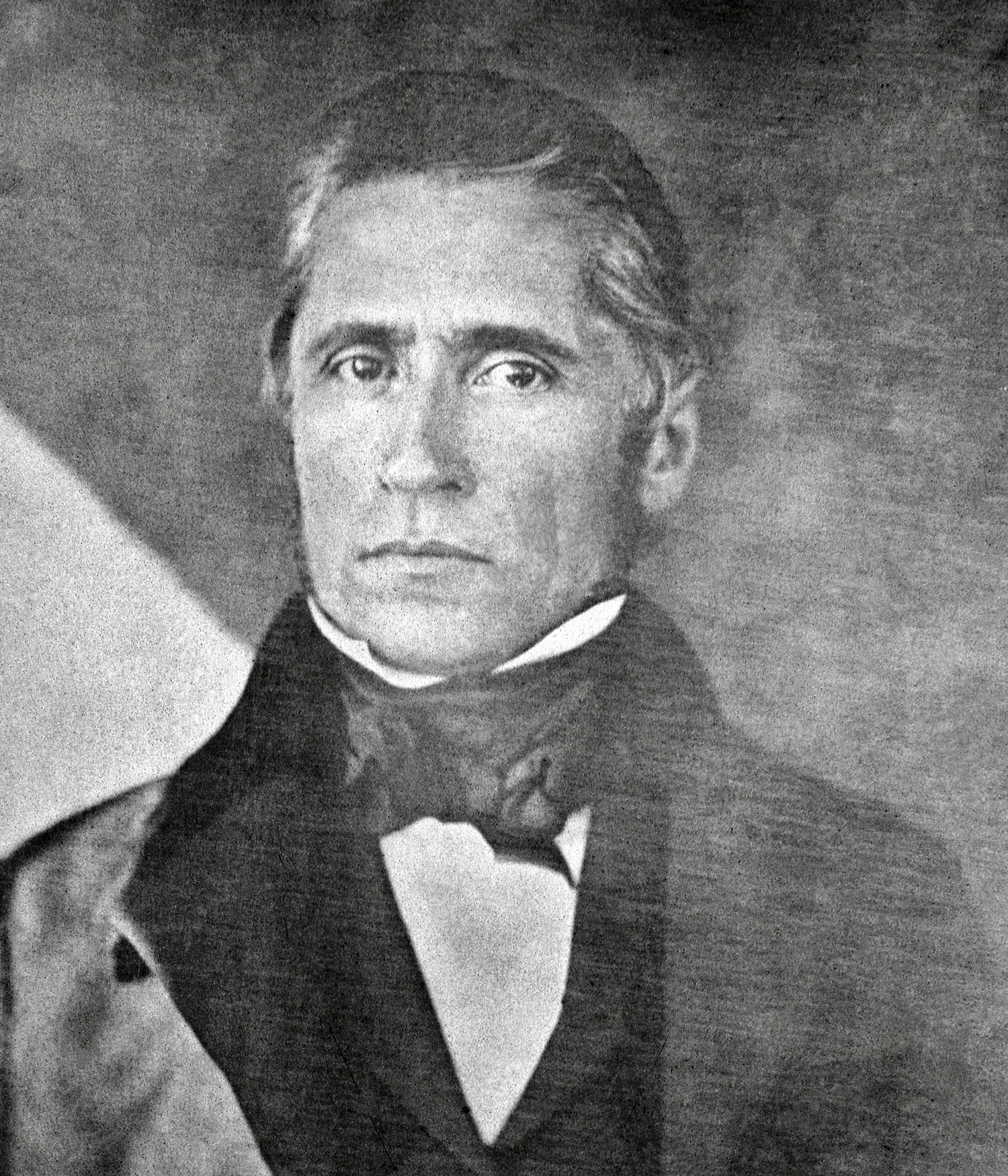
- Photograph taken about 1845
- Born: July 20, 1797; Gulschin, Province of Posen, Prussia
- Died: October 6, 1873 (aged 76); London, United Kingdom
- Resting place: Church of St. Adalbert, Poznań, Poland
- Education: University of Heidelberg
- Occupations: Geographer, geologist, explorer
- Known for: Exploration of Australia, work for the British Relief Association during the Great Famine (Ireland)
- Awards: Founder's Medal (1846); Companion, Order of the Bath (1849); Knight Grand Cross, Order of St Michael and St George (1869), Fellow of the Royal Society, Fellow of the Royal Geographical Society, Honorary Doctorate of Civil Law (Oxon.)

Sir Paweł Edmund Strzelecki KCMG CB FRS FRGS DCL (Polish pronunciation: [ˈpavɛw ˈɛdmunt stʂɛˈlɛt͡skʲi]; (Note: By Australian English speakers: [pɔːl strʌzlɛki] (paul struhzLECKi).) 20 July 1797 – 6 October 1873), also known as Paul Edmund de Strzelecki and Sir Paul Strzelecki, was a Polish explorer, geologist, humanitarian, environmentalist, nobleman, scientist, businessman and philanthropist who in 1845 also became a British subject.

He is noted for his contributions to the exploration of Australia, particularly the Snowy Mountains and Tasmania, and for climbing and naming the highest – 2228 metres (7310 feet) – mountain on the continent, Mount Kosciuszko.

== Early years ==
Strzelecki was born in 1797, in the village of Gulschin near Posen (today Głuszyna, district of Poznań) in the times of partitions of Poland. He was the third child of Franciszek Strzelecki and Anna Raczyńska, both from Polish nobility (szlachta), who leased the Gulschin estate at the time. In Australia, Strzelecki was referred to as Count though there is no proof that he actually approved or used such a title himself.

As Province of Posen was then under the Kingdom of Prussia, Strzelecki was a Prussian citizen. He left school without matriculating, then served briefly in the Prussian Army in the 6th Regiment of Thuringian Uhlans, at the time known as the Polish Regiment because the majority of the staff were Poles. Strzelecki submitted his resignation due to the strict Prussian discipline that he did not approve of. There are some suggestions that he deserted the Regiment but in the official history of the Regiment the name Strzelecki does not appear. Not long after, he became a tutor at a manor of local nobility. He fell in love with his young student, a girl of 15, Aleksandryna (Adyna) Turno, but was rejected as a suitor by her father, Adam Turno. There are stories that Strzelecki attempted unsuccessfully to elope with Adyna, but biographers find this unlikely. Adyna and Strzelecki exchanged letters over 40 years but they never married. Provided with funds by his family, Strzelecki travelled in Austria and Italy. He eventually came under the notice of the Polish Prince Franciszek Sapieha who placed him in charge of his large estate in the Russian-occupied part of Poland. Strzelecki was then about 26 years of age and carried out his duties very successfully. Some years later the prince died, and a dispute arose between his son and heir, Eustace, and Strzelecki. Eustace refused to pay Strzelecki the prince's bequest – a huge sum of money and a considerable estate – accusing him of bad faith and prevarication. After four years the dispute was settled. Strzelecki left Poland about 1829 and stayed some time in France, from where he travelled to Africa.

He had no formal training in geology, a science then in its infancy in England, but was probably, like his English contemporaries, self taught.

On 8 June 1834, he sailed from Liverpool to New York. He travelled widely in North America, analysing soil, examining minerals (tradition claims he discovered copper in Canada), and visiting farms to study soil conservation and to analyse the gluten content of wheat. In South America in 1836 he visited the most important mineral areas and he went up the west coast from Chile to California. During this time he became a strong opponent of the slave trade. He went to Cuba, Tahiti and the South Sea Islands, and came to New Zealand probably about the beginning of 1839.

== Australia ==
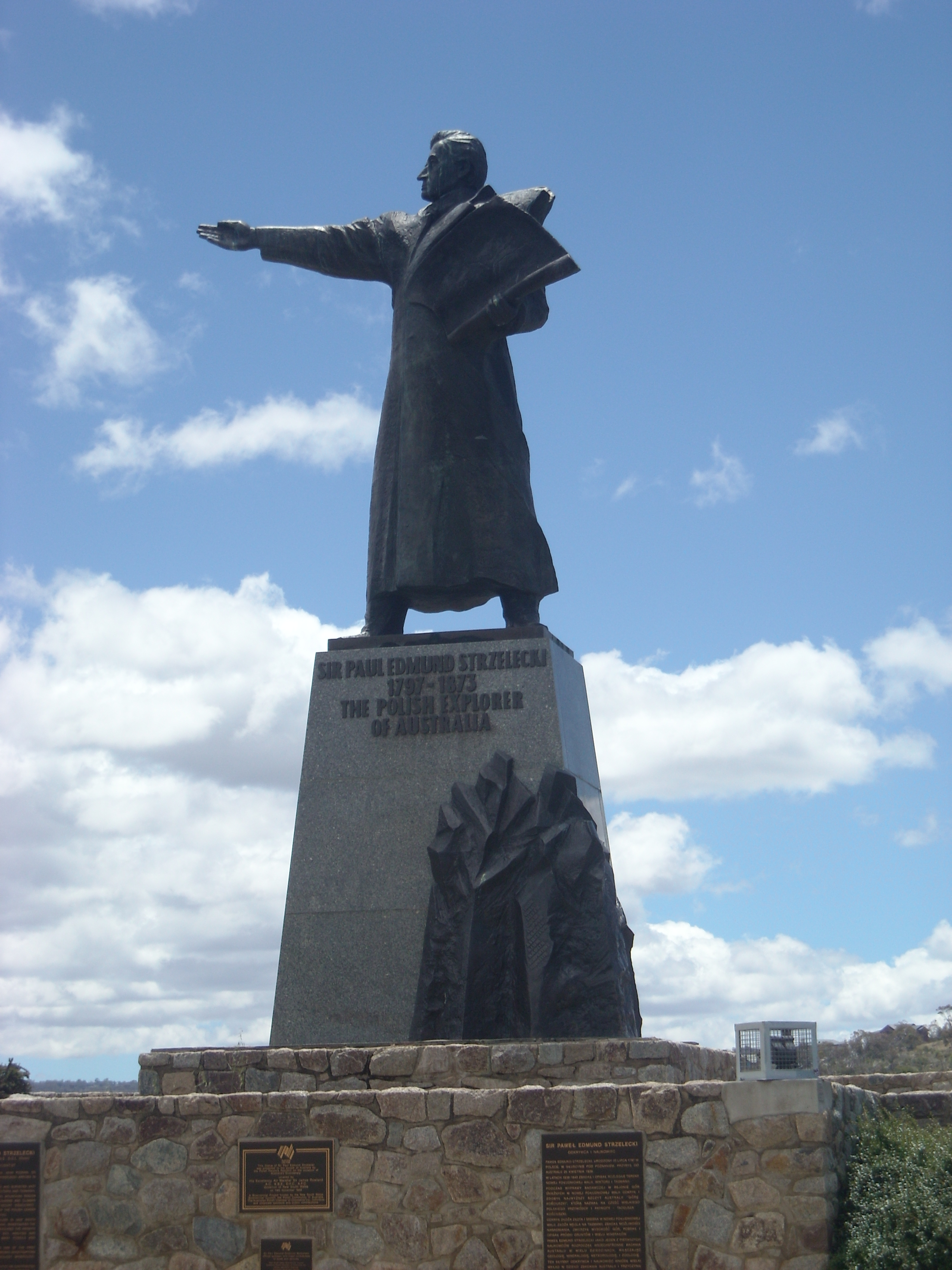
Statue of Strzelecki in Jindabyne

Strzelecki arrived at Sydney on 25 April 1839. He visited the estate of his friend James Macarthur at Camden. He wrote about meeting the German vintners that the Macarthurs had brought to Australia from the Rheingau region. He wrote: "I had gone with my host to look at the farm, the fields, and the vineyard,—contiguous to which last stood in a row six neat cottages, surrounded with kitchen gardens, and inhabited by six families of German vine-dressers, who emigrated two years ago to New South Wales, either driven there by necessity, or seduced by the hope of finding, beyond the sea, fortune, peace, and happiness,—perhaps justice and liberty. The German salutation which I gave to the group that stood nearest, was like some signal-bell, which instantly set the whole colony in motion. Fathers, mothers, and children came running from all sides to see, to salute, and to talk to the gentleman who came from Germany. They took me for their fellow-countryman, and were happy, questioning me about Germany, the Rhine, and their native town. I was far from undeceiving them."

His main interest was the mineralogy of Australia. In September he discovered gold and silver near Wellington (NSW) and in the Vale of Clwyd, in the vicinity of Hartley. He collected there numerous samples of Australian gold, which were sent to the eminent geologist Sir Roderick Murchison of London, and also to Berlin, but the Governor of New South Wales, Sir George Gipps, fearing unrest among 45,000 convicts, stifled the news about the discovery.

Later in 1839 Strzelecki set out on an expedition into the Australian Alps and explored the Snowy Mountains with James Macarthur, James Riley, and two Aboriginal guides: Charley Tarra and Jackey. In 1840 he climbed the highest peak on mainland Australia and named it Mount Kosciuszko, to honour Tadeusz Kościuszko, one of the national heroes of Poland and a hero of the American Revolutionary War. On Victorian maps (but never on New South Wales maps) the name Mount Kosciusko was erroneously connected to the neighbouring peak, at present known as Mount Townsend and causing later many confusions, including the recent incorrect information on swapping the names of the mountains. From there Strzelecki explored Gippsland which he named after the governor. After passing the La Trobe River it was found necessary to abandon the horses and all the specimens that had been collected and try to reach Western Port. For 22 days they were on the edge of starvation and were ultimately saved by the knowledge and hunting ability of their guide Charlie, who caught native animals for them to eat. The party, practically exhausted, arrived at Western Port on 12 May 1840 and reached Melbourne on 28 May. The Strzelecki Ranges are named in his honour.

From 1840 to 1842, based in Launceston, Tasmania (then known as Van Diemen's Land), Strzelecki explored nearly every part of the island, usually on foot with three men and two pack horses. His friends, the Lieutenant-Governor, Sir John Franklin, and his wife, Lady Jane, afforded him every help in his scientific endeavours.

Strzelecki left Tasmania on 29 September 1842 by steamer and arrived in Sydney on 2 October. He was collecting specimens in northern New South Wales towards the end of that year, and on 22 April 1843, he left Sydney after having travelled 11,000 kilometres (7,000 miles) through New South Wales, Victoria and Tasmania, examining the geology along the way. He went to England after visiting China, the East Indies and Egypt.

In 1845 he published his Physical Description of New South Wales and Van Diemen's Land. The book gained the praise of Charles Darwin and other scientists and was awarded the Founder's Medal of the Royal Geographical Society. It was an unsurpassed source of knowledge on Australia for at least forty-five years. In it, he describes terra nullius as a "sophistry of law" and writes that Aboriginal Australians are "as strongly attached to... property, and the rights which it involves, as any European political body." He also published the first map of Gippsland and its description which helped to open up this fertile part of Victoria. He produced the first large geological map of Eastern Australia and Tasmania.

In 1845 he became a naturalised British subject.

== Philanthropy ==
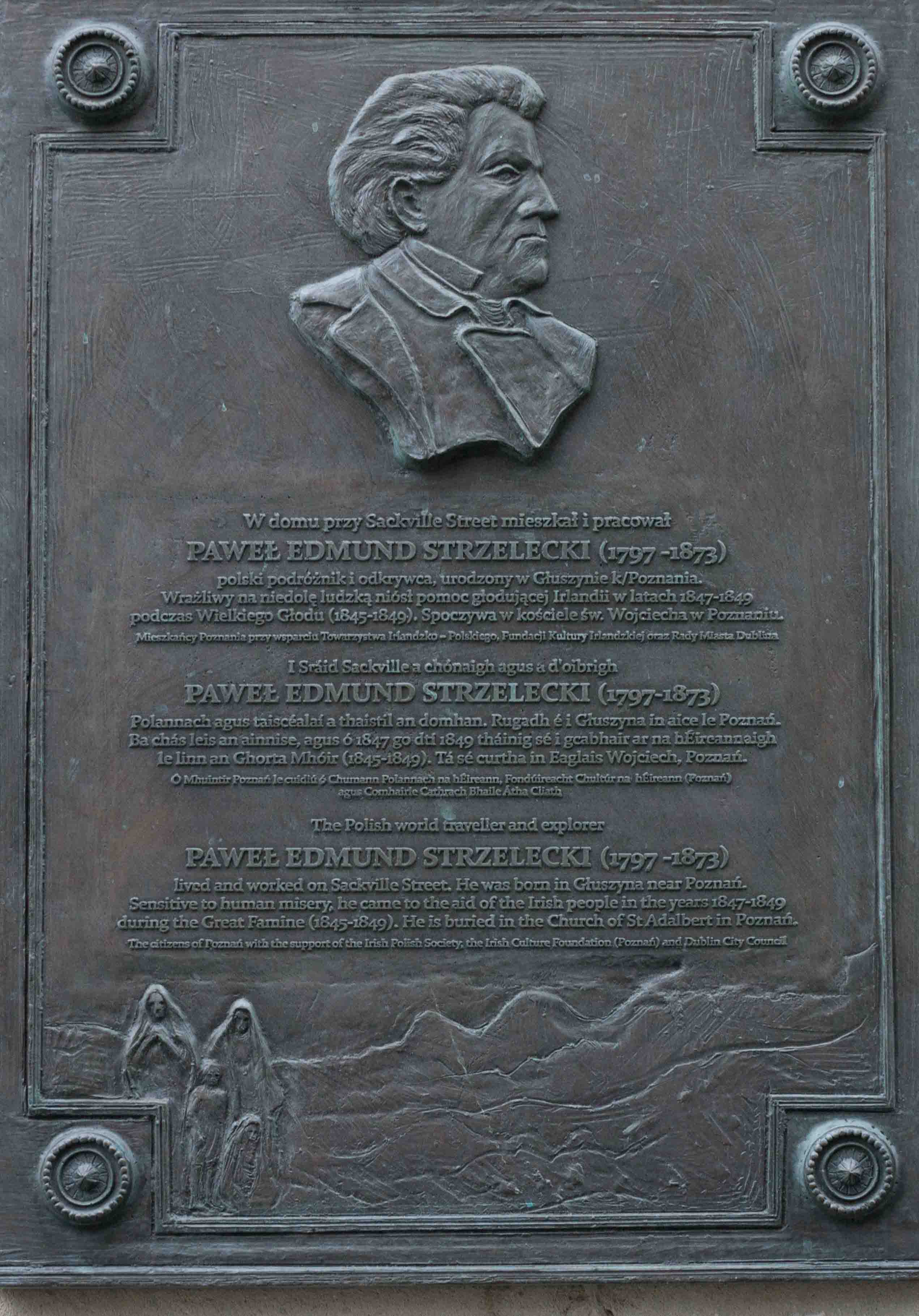
Sir Paweł Edmund Strzelecki memorial plaque beside Clerys Department Store, Dublin with memorial in Polish, Irish and English

During the autumn and winter of 1846–47 the disaster of the great famine came to Ireland. In January 1847, a group of English banking leaders combined to raise funds for famine relief via a private charity named the “British Relief Association” and entrusted Strzelecki to dispense them (£500,000). Strzelecki was appointed the main agent of the Association to superintend the distribution of supplies in County Sligo, County Mayo and County Donegal. In order to alleviate the critical situation of famished Irish families and especially children, Strzelecki developed a visionary and exceptionally effective mode of assistance: feeding starving children directly through the schools. He extended daily food rations to schoolchildren across the most famine-stricken western part of Ireland, while also distributing clothing and promoting basic hygiene. At its peak in 1848, around 200,000 children from all denominations were being fed through the efforts of the B.R.A., many of whom would have otherwise perished from hunger and disease. Despite suffering from the effects of typhoid fever he contracted in Ireland, Strzelecki dedicated himself tirelessly to hunger relief. His commitment was widely recognized and praised by his contemporaries. In recognition of his services, he was made a Companion of the Order of the Bath (CB) in November 1848.

Strzelecki helped impoverished Irish families to seek new lives in Australia. He was, for many years, an active member of Family Colonisation Loan Society, originated by Caroline Chisholm and in 1854 was its chairman, fulfilling his duties with great zeal.

He was also an esteemed member of Lord Herbert's Emigration Committee and of the Duke of Wellington's Emigration Committee. He was, additionally, a member of the Crimean Army Fund Committee. At the end of the Crimean campaign he accompanied Lord Lyons on a visit to Sevastopol. Strzelecki was also associated with Florence Nightingale and helped her in facilitating the publication of a series of her articles.

He died of liver cancer in London in 1873 and was buried in Kensal Green Cemetery. In 1997 his remains were transferred to the crypt of merit at the Church of St. Adalbert in his hometown of Poznań, Poland.

== Awards and honours ==
Strzelecki was made a fellow of the Royal Geographical Society and was awarded its Founder's Medal for "exploration in the south eastern portion of Australia". The Society still displays his huge geological map of New South Wales and Tasmania for public viewing.

He was also appointed a Fellow of the Royal Society, having gained widespread recognition as an explorer and philanthropist.

He was awarded an honorary degree of Doctor of Civil Law from the University of Oxford, appointed Companion of the Order of the Bath (CB) in 1849, and appointed Knight Commander of the Order of St Michael and St George (KCMG) in 1869.

In 1983 he was honoured on a postage stamp depicting his portrait issued by Australia Post.

In 2023, the city of Poznań declared 2023 as "The Year of Strzelecki" in order to honour and celebrate the life of the explorer and his accomplishments.

== Named after him ==
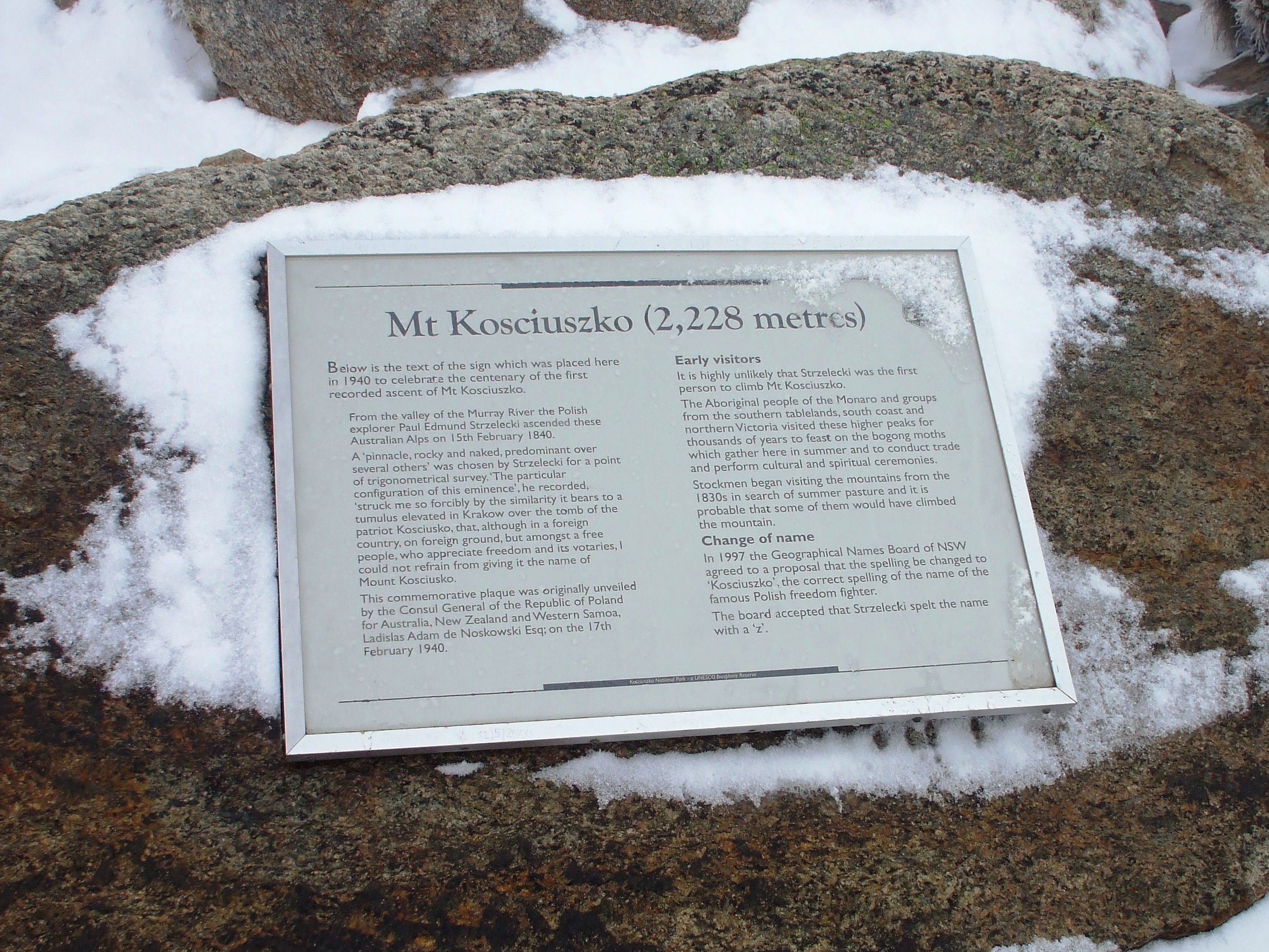
A commemorative plaque devoted to Strzelecki on the summit of Mount Kosciuszko, the highest mountain in Australia

In Australia

- Strzelecki Ranges, Victoria, in which is located the township of Strzelecki. The Strzelecki railway line ran through the ranges to the township.
- Mount Strzelecki, Northern Territory
- Strzelecki Peak, Flinders Island
- Strzelecki Creek, South Australia
- Strzelecki Highway, Victoria
- Strzelecki Track, South Australia
- Strzelecki Desert, east of Lake Eyre in South Australia
- Strzelecki Scenic Lookout, Newcastle, New South Wales

In Canada

- Strzelecki Harbour

== Writing ==
- Physical Description of New South Wales. Accompanied by a Geological Map, Sections and Diagrams, and Figures of the Organic Remains (London, 1845).

== See also ==
- List of Poles
- Poles in the United Kingdom
- Timeline of Polish science and technology
