= Blanchewater Station =

Pastoral lease in South Australia

Coordinates: 29.54998°S 139.45236°E

Location in South Australia

Blanchewater Station is a pastoral lease that operates as a cattle station in the far north of South Australia.

== Description ==
It is situated approximately 134 kilometres (83 mi) north east of Lyndhurst and 236 kilometres (147 mi) south west of Innamincka. The MacDonnell River traverses the property and flows into Lake Blanche. A large waterhole on Mount Hopeless Creek is also situated to the east and once operated as an outstation. The Strzelecki Creek also flows through the property all the way to the northern Flinders Ranges are found to the south of the station.

The first European to visit to the area was Benjamin Babbage in 1856, who named the area after Governor McDonnell's wife. George Goyder surveyed the area in 1857 and John Baker took up a 200 square miles (518 km^{2}) lease and stocked the property with cattle in 1858.

Augustus Charles Gregory and his party arrived at Blanchewater in 1858 trekking in from the north east from what was believed to be trackless desert and impassable salt lakes. The group had followed the Strzelecki Creek proving it to be the best way to travel through the interior from the Pacific to the Southern Ocean.

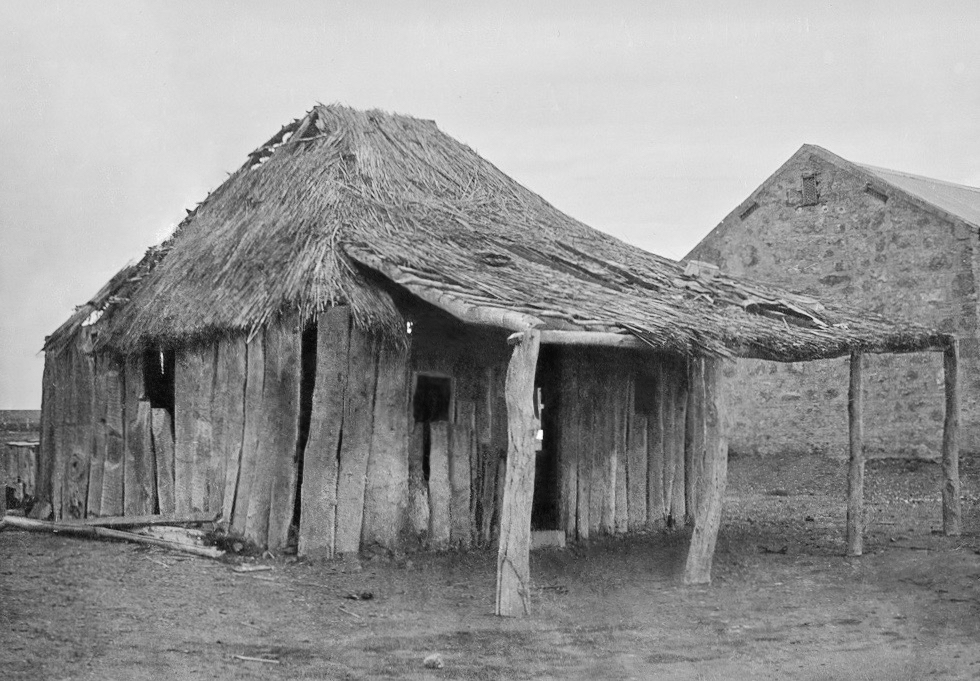
A timber dwelling with a wooden thatched roof, identified as "original Government House, Blanchewater", in 1897 by Robert Mitchell

Harry Redford and his accomplices George Dewdney and William Rooke stole between 600 and 1,000 cattle from Bowen Downs Station in Queensland. The men then overlanded the stock approximately 1,300 kilometres (808 mi) down Cooper Creek to outback South Australia. The trek took over three months and the men sold the stock for £5000 to Blanchewater Station. Station employees tracked the herd and Redford was eventually arrested for the crime.

Baker died in 1872 and the executors of the estate sold the 1,050-square-mile (2,719 km^{2}) property stocked with 1,000 horses and 2,5000 cattle to E. M. Bagot. Blanchewater and the other five properties of Bakers including Wirrabunna, Peninsula and Lake Albert sold for a total of £130,000,

The property was owned by Thomas Elder in 1874.

== See also ==
- List of ranches and stations
