= Mount Hopeless (Queensland) =

Mountain in Queensland, Australia

Mount Hopeless (25°03′S 147°22′E) is a mountain in the Murweh Shire of Queensland. It has a maximum altitude of 833 metres above the sea level.
