= Tinga Tingana =

Pastoral lease in South Australia

Coordinates: 28.80°S 140.167°E

Location in South Australia

Tinga Tingana Station was a pastoral lease that once operated as a sheep station in outback South Australia.

The 1,492-square-mile (3,864 km^{2}) lease was originally taken up by William Christopher Burkitt in 1874. The lease straddled the sandy country on either side of the Strzelecki Creek and had one semi-permanent waterhole along with five wells to water stock. Burkitt abandoned the station in 1889 after the lease expired.

A fortnightly mail coach ran through the property in 1878 on the Strzelecki Track, with a horse changing station located on the property; the track to Tinga Tingana from the track was still utilised in the 1960s.

An Aboriginal stockman named Logic killed his overseer, Cornelius Mulhall, at the property in 1878. Logic then disappeared into the Strzelecki Desert, evading capture for two years until he returned and was arrested. It was later found that Mulhall had treated Logic brutally and he was released in 1885 and eventually returned to his old job at Tinga Tingala in 1886.

The lease was briefly held by Turton and Bristow but in 1890 the government appointed a caretaker, G.L. Prior. John Warren of Anna Creek took over in 1892 and then abandoned in 1895 after drought and rabbit infestation. Another caretaker, Samuel Watts, looked after the property from 1896 until his death in 1897. All the Strzelecki stations were abandoned in 1899.

The Tinga Tingana Homestead Ruins are listed on the South Australian Heritage Register. Much of the former station lies within the modern locality of Lindon.

== See also ==
- List of ranches and stations
