= Strzelecki Track =

Outback track in South Australia

Strzelecki Track South Australia

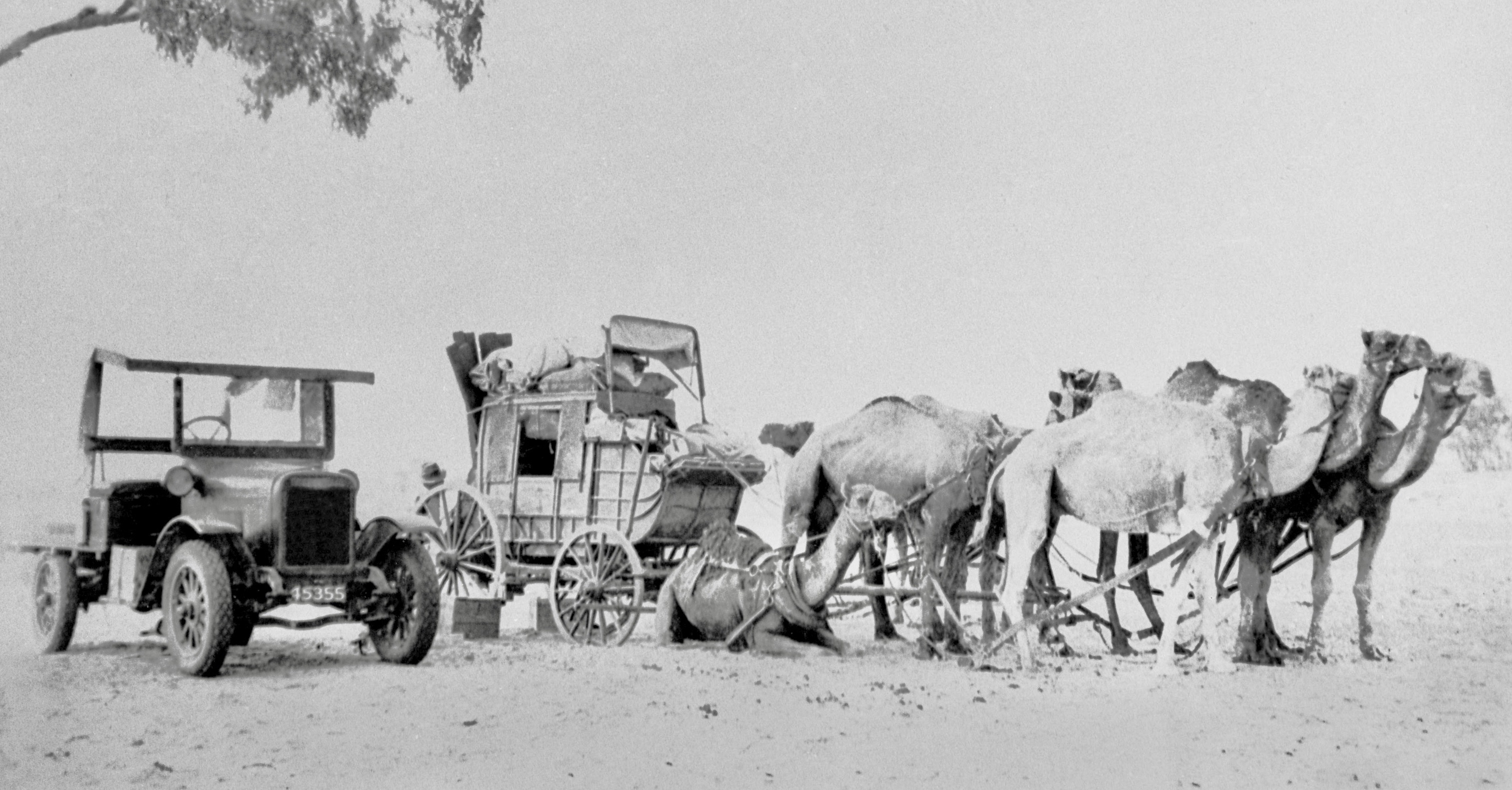
- The Strzelecki Track (blue and white) and the old part of the track at the northern end Transferring mail from a camel-drawn coach to a motor truck at Carraweena, near the mid-point of the Strzelecki Track, about 1920
- Coordinates: 27.747383°S 140.736138°E (Northeast end); 30.287657°S 138.349378°E (Southwest end)

General information
- Type: Track
- Length: 472 km (293 mi)

Major junctions
- Northeast end: Cordillo Downs Road; Innamincka, South Australia
- Adventure Way
- Southwest end: The Outback Highway; Lyndhurst, South Australia

Location(s)
- Region: Far North

Restrictions
- Fuel supply: Lyndhurst, Innamincka, Cameron Corner

Strzelecki Track is a mostly unsealed outback track in South Australia, linking Innamincka to Lyndhurst.

== History ==
In 1870, the 472-kilometre (293-mile) track was pioneered by stockman, drover and cattle thief Harry Readford. He stole 1,000 head of cattle from a remote cattle station in Queensland. He drove them down the track, and sold them at Blanchewater Station. He then fled to Adelaide. Pastoralists then used the track as a stock route in the late 19th and early 20th centuries.

After gas was discovered by Santos in the 1960s, it started carrying more traffic as a route to Moomba. Some sections were sealed.

In 2026 work commenced to bolster a 33 kilometre section of the track between Art Baker Lookout and Mount Hopeless. In September 2026, work commenced on sealing the track between Mount Hopeless and the Dingo Fence. By this stage 225 of the 472 kilometres had been sealed.

== Description ==
The track links Innamincka to Lyndhurst through the Strzelecki Desert. It is mostly unsealed, but with a few short sealed sections to facilitate overtaking. It is passable to conventional vehicles during the dry season, although caution is required.

The track is prone to flooding after heavy rains. At other times the surface can be corrugated, with loose stones and dust.

The Strzelecki Track is linked with the Birdsville Track via the Walkers Crossing Track. It is closed in summer and only traversable in dry weather.

A shorter route is available via a public access road between Moomba and Innamincka, making the distance 458 kilometres (285 miles).

== Heritage listings ==
A number of isolated heritage-listed sites are located nearby to the Strzelecki Track:

- Tinga Tingana Homestead Ruins
- Gray's Tree
- Well and Whim, Coochilara Waterhole, Merty Merty Station
- Old Mulga Bore, Merty Merty Station

== See also ==
- Highways in Australia
- List of highways in South Australia
- Stock route
