= Lyndhurst, South Australia =

Lyndhurst
- Town
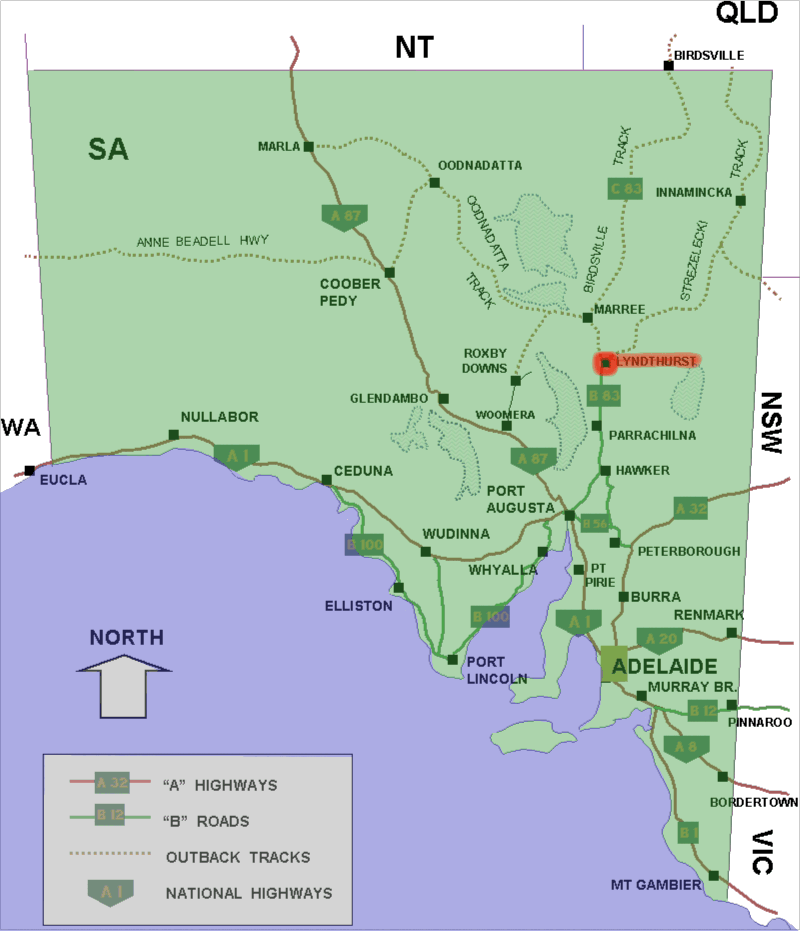
- Location of Lyndhurst in South Australia (red)
- Coordinates: 30°17′07″S 138°20′51″E
- Country: Australia
- State: South Australia
- Region: Far North
- LGA: Outback Communities Authority
- Established: 20 February 1896 (town); 8 February 2001 (locality)

Government
  - State electorate: Stuart
  - Federal division: Grey

Population
  - Total: 3 (SAL 2021)
- Time zone: UTC+9:30 (ACST)
  - Summer (DST): UTC+10:30 (ACDT)
- Postcode: 5731
Localities around Lyndhurst
Myrtle Springs	Farina Station	Mount Lyndhurst
Myrtle Springs	Lyndhurst	Leigh Creek Station
Myrtle Springs	Leigh Creek Station	Leigh Creek Station

Lyndhurst is a town in north-east South Australia which is at the crossroads of the Strzelecki Track and the Oodnadatta Track. It began as a railway siding in 1878.

== History ==
The original inhabitants of the area were the Aboriginal nation of the Kuyani people.

The town is at the southern end of the Strzelecki Track, whose northern end is at Innamincka. It was once a station on the original train route north known as the Great Northern Railway that was planned to reach Darwin, but only ever made it to Alice Springs. This railway line became known as the Ghan, and the last train ran along it in 1980. The route was always subject to the weather and wash outs, and a more permanent route has been constructed some 200 kilometres (120 mi) to the west, and subsequently extended to Darwin in 2003. 80 km to the north is Marree, a small town that is at the junction of the Oodnadatta and Birdsville Tracks.

Lyndhurst was gazetted as a town in 1896, and initially served as a freight centre for the railways that were connected in 1882. Mount Lyndhurst, 30 kilometres (19 mi) east, was named after the British Lord Chancellor by the government surveyor Samuel Perry. In the 1860s, Thomas Elder took up vast areas in the northern Flinders Ranges region and called the property Mount Lyndhurst.

== Visitor attractions ==
- Ochre Cliffs, approximately 2 km north of the town, is the site of an aboriginal mine that provided colours to be used in dyes and paints.
- Murtee Johnny's grave – he was the last full blood Yantruwanta/Yandruwandha Aboriginal man. He was born c.1888 and died in Adelaide in 1979. He was an accomplished stockman, working on the Mount Hopeless in the Flinders Ranges.
- Mount Lyndhurst Important Bird Area, lying about 30 km east of the town on Mount Lyndhurst Station, is a well-known birdwatching site for chestnut-breasted whitefaces.
- Talc Alf, the Talc Mine, and Alf's art.

== Notable people ==
- "Dollar Mick" Smith (died 1969), an Aboriginal stockman who taught R. M. Williams his leatherwork skills when he set up his first factory at Nepabunna in 1932, leading to the establishment of the highly successful RM Williams Company, which still produces a distinctive style of boot today.

== See also ==
- Lyndhurst (disambiguation)
