= Lake Blanche =

Salt lake in South Australia

- Location in South Australia
- Location: South Australia
- Coordinates: 29°15′36″S 139°39′57″E
- Type: Salt lake
- Basin countries: Australia
- Designation: DIWA wetland
- Max. length: 40 kilometres (25 mi)
- Max. width: 16 kilometres (10 mi)
- Surface area: 560 square kilometres (215 mi^{2})
- Settlements: Murnpeowie

Lake Blanche is a salt lake in central South Australia that lies below sea level. It is located within the Strzelecki Creek Wetland System, which is listed on A Directory of Important Wetlands in Australia. It also is within the extent of the Strzelecki Desert Lakes Important Bird Area, identified as such by BirdLife International because of its importance for waterbirds when holding water in the aftermath of floods.

== See also ==
- List of lakes of Australia § South Australia
- Strzelecki Regional Reserve
