= 1979 in paleontology =

Paleontology or palaeontology is the study of prehistoric life forms on Earth through the examination of plant and animal fossils. This includes the study of body fossils, tracks (ichnites), burrows, cast-off parts, fossilised feces (coprolites), palynomorphs and chemical residues. Because humans have encountered fossils for millennia, paleontology has a long history both before and after becoming formalized as a science. This article records significant discoveries and events related to paleontology that occurred or were published in the year 1979.

== Bryophytes ==
Name	Novelty	Status	Authors	Age	Type locality	Location	Notes	Images
Aulacomnium heterostichoides	Sp nov	Valid	Janssens	Ypresian	Horsefly Shales	Canada; British Columbia	An aulacomniaceous moss.	

== Fish ==
Name	Novelty	Status	Authors	Age	Type locality	Location	Notes	Images
Libotonius pearsoni	Sp nov	Valid	Wilson	Ypresian	Klondike Mountain Formation	USA; Washington	A libotoniid sandroller relative.	Libotonius pearsoni

== Archosauromorphs ==
Data courtesy of George Olshevsky's dinosaur genera list.

=== Non Avian Dinosaurs ===
Name	Novelty	Status	Authors	Age	Type locality	Location	Notes	Images
"Gadolosaurus"		Nomen nudum.	Saito	Cenomanian	Bayan Shireh Formation	Mongolia	informal name created by phonetic translation of the crylic for hadrosaur ("gadrosavr") into Japanese. Skeleton considered possibly a juvenile Arstanosaurus.	juvenile ?Arstanosaurus
Gilmoreosaurus	Gen et comb nov	Valid	Brett-Surman	Cretaceous late Campanian - early Maastrichtian	Iren Dabasu Formation	Mongolia	A hadrosauroid.	Gilmareasaurus
Gravitholus		Junior synonym?	Wall & Galton	Judithian	Dinosaur Park Formation	Canada( Alberta)	A pachycephalosaur, possible Junior synonym of Stegoceras.	Gravitholus
Maiasaura		Valid	Horner & Makela	Judithian	Upper Two Medicine Formation	United States (Montana)	Publication of Maiasaura renewed interest in the Two Medicine Formation.	Maiasaura peeblesorum
Majungatholus	Gen et sp nov	Junior synonym	Hans-Dieter Sues & Philippe Taquet	Maastrichtian	Maevarano Formation	Madagascar	Described as a pachycephalosaur, now considered an abelisaurid. The type species is M. atopus. Junior synonym of Majungasaurus.	Majungasaurus
Microhadrosaurus	Gen et sp nov	Nomen dubium.	Zhiming	Campanian	Yuanpu Formation	China	A hadrosaurid.	
Mussaurus		Valid	Bonaparte & Vince	Norian	Laguna Colorada Formation	Argentina	An anchisaurian.	Mussaurus
Nanshiungosaurus		Valid	Zhiming	Campanian	Yuanpu Formation	China	A therizinosaur.	Nanshiungosaurus
Patagosaurus		Valid	Bonaparte	Callovian	Canadon Asfalto Formation	Argentina	A sauropod.	Patagosaurus
Piatnitzkysaurus		Valid	Bonaparte	Callovian	Canadon Asfalto Formation	Argentina	A piatnitzkysaurid.	Piatnitzkysaurus
Secernosaurus		Valid	Brett-Surma	Cretaceous late Campanian - early Maastrichtian	Bajo Barreal Formation; Los Alamitos Formation	Argentina	A saurolophine hadrosaurid.	
Segnosaurus		Valid	Perle	Cenomanian-Turonian	Bayan Shireh Formation	Mongolia	A therizinosaur.	Segnosaurus
Torvosaurus	Gen et sp nov	Valid	Galton & Jenson	Jurassic late Kimmeridgian-Tithonian	Morrison Formation	United States; Colorado	A megalosaurid.	Torvosaurus
Unquillosaurus	Gen et sp nov	Valid	Powell	Campanian	Los Blanquitos Formation	Argentina	A possible Carcharodontosaurian.	
Volkheimeria		Valid	Jose Bonaparte	Callovian	Canadon Asfalto Formation	Argentina	A sauropod.	
Yandusaurus	Gen et sp nov	Valid	He	Oxfordian	Shangshaximiao Formation	China	A basal neornithischian ornithopod.	

=== Birds ===
Name	Novelty	Status	Authors	Age	Unit	Location	Notes	Images
Amplibuteo hibbardi	Gen. nov. et Sp. nov.	Valid	Kenneth E. Campbell, Jr.	Late Pleistocene	Talara Tar Seeps	Peru	An Accipitridae, this is the type species of the new genus.	
Anas albae	Sp. nov.	Valid	Dénes Jánossy	Late Pliocene	MN 15-16-17	Hungary	An Anatidae.	
Anas amotape	Sp. nov.	Valid	Kenneth E. Campbell, Jr.	Late Pleistocene	Talara Tar Seeps	Peru	An Anatidae.	
Anas sanctaehelenae	Sp. nov.	Valid	Kenneth E. Campbell, Jr.	Early Pleistocene; Late Pleistocene	La Carolina	Ecuador	An Anatidae.	
Anas talarae	Sp. nov.	Valid	Kenneth E. Campbell, Jr.	Early Pleistocene; Late Pleistocene	Argentina: Centinale del Mar; Talara Tar Seeps	Argentina; Peru	An Anatidae, transferred to the genus Callonetta Delacour, 1936 by Agnolin, 2006.	
Ardea bennuides	Sp. nov.	Valid	Ella Hoch	Subrecent	5000 YBP (Years Before Present)	UAE	A giant Ardeidae, not formally described but a photo is published which keeps it from being a Nomen Nudum.	
Argillipes magnus	Sp. nov.	Valid	Colin J. O. Harrison Cyril A. Walker	Early Middle Oligocene	MP 21-23	UK	Described in the Catharthidae, transferred to Aves Incertae Sedis.	
Barawertornis tedfordi	Gen. nov. et Sp. nov.	Valid	Patricia Vickers-Rich	Late Oligocene/Early Miocene	Carl Creek Limestone	Australia	A Dromornithidae, this is the type species of the new genus.	
Belonopterus edmundi	Sp. nov.	Valid	Kenneth E. Campbell, Jr.	Late Pleistocene	Talara Tar Seeps	Peru	A Charadriidae.	
Bubo longaevus	Sp. nov.	Valid	A. S. Umanskaya	Late Miocene	MN 11-13	Soviet Union (Actually Ukraine)	A Strigidae, transferred to the genus Asio Brisson, 1760 by Mlíkovský, 1998.	
Bullockornis planei	Gen. nov. et Sp. nov.	Valid	Patricia Vickers-Rich	Middle-Late Miocene	Camfield Beds	Australia	A Dromornithidae, this is the type species of the new genus.	
Caprimulgus piurensis	Sp. nov.	Valid	Kenneth E. Campbell, Jr.	Late Pleistocene	Talara Tar Seeps	Peru	A Caprimulgidae-nightjar.	
Cayaoa bruneti	Gen. nov. et Sp. nov.	Valid	Eduardo P. Tonni	Late Oligocene-Miocene		Argentina	An Anatidae.	
Corvus simionescui	Sp. nov.	Valid	Jenö Kessler	Early Pliocene	MN 15	Romania	A Corvidae, possibly a synonym of Corvus corone Linnaeus, 1758.	
Cuculus csarnotanus	Sp. nov.	Valid	Dénes Jánossy	Early Pliocene	MN 15	Hungary	A Cuculidae.	
Dege hendeyi	Gen. nov. et Sp. nov.	Valid	George G. Simpson	Late Miocene-Early Pliocene	Varswater Formation	South Africa	A Spheniscidae, this is the type species of the new genus.	
Dromornis stirtoni	Sp. nov.	Valid	Patricia Vickers-Rich	Late Miocene-Early Pliocene	Alcoota Homestead	Australia	A Dromornithidae.	
Eudocimus peruvianus	Sp. nov.	Valid	Kenneth E. Campbell, Jr.	Late Pleistocene	Talara Tar Seeps	Peru	A Threskiornithidae.	
Gallinago veterior	Sp. nov.	Valid	Dénes Jánossy	Early Pliocene	MN 15	Hungary	A Scolopacidae.	
Geronogyps reliquus	Gen. nov. et Sp. nov.	Valid	Kenneth E. Campbell, Jr.	Late Pleistocene	Talara Tar Seeps	Peru	A Cathartidae.	
Glareola neogena	Sp. nov.	Valid	Peter Ballmann	Middle Miocene	MN 6	Germany	A Glareolidae.	
Gymnogyps howardae	Sp. nov.	Valid	Kenneth E. Campbell, Jr.	Late Pleistocene	Talara Tar Seeps	Peru	A Cathartidae.	
Ilbandornis? lawsoni	Gen. nov. et Sp. nov.	Valid	Patricia Vickers-Rich	Late Miocene-Early Pliocene	Alcoota Homestead	Australia	A Dromornithidae, not certainly an Ilbandornis Rich, 1979.	
Ilbandornis woodburnei	Gen. nov. et Sp. nov.	Valid	Patricia Vickers-Rich	Late Miocene-Early Pliocene	Alcoota Homestead	Australia	A Dromornithidae, this is the type species of the new genus.	
Latipons gardneri	Gen. nov. et Sp. nov.	Valid	Colin J. O. Harrison Cyril A. Walker	Middle Eocene	MP 11-13	UK	A Rallidae, this is the type species of the new genus.	
Latipons robinsoni	Sp. nov.	Valid	Colin J. O. Harrison Cyril A. Walker	Middle Eocene	MP 11-13	UK	A Rallidae.	
Litoripes medius	Gen. nov. et Sp. nov.	Valid	Colin J. O. Harrison Cyril A. Walker	Middle Eocene	MP 11-13	UK	Described in the Phasianidae, but transferred by Mlíkovský, 2002. to Aves Incertae Sedis, this is the type species of the new genus.	
Micropalama chapmani	Sp. nov.	Valid	Kenneth E. Campbell, Jr.	Late Pleistocene	Talara Tar Seeps	Peru	A Scolopacidae.	
Milvago brodkorbi	Gen. nov. et Sp. nov.	Valid	Kenneth E. Campbell, Jr.	Late Pleistocene	Talara Tar Seeps	Peru	A Falconidae.	
Milvoides kempi	Gen. nov. et Sp. nov.	Valid	Colin J. O. Harrison Cyril A. Walker	Middle Eocene	MP 11-13	UK	Described as an Accipitridae, known only from a damaged distal end of a right tarsometatarsus, making it not possible to identify it, better treated as Aves Incertae Sedis, this is the type species of the new genus.	
Mioglareola gregaria	Gen. nov. et Sp. nov.	Valid	Peter Ballmann	Early Miocene Czech Republic; Middle Miocene Germany	MN 4b; MN 6	Czech Republic; Germany	A Glareolidae, it is the type species of the new genus.	
Miootis compactus	Gen. nov. et Sp. nov.	Valid	A. S. Umanskaya	Late Miocene	MN 13	Soviet Union (Actually Ukraine)	An Otididae, it is the type species of the new genus.	
Miraquila terrestris	Gen. nov. et Sp. nov.	Valid	Kenneth E. Campbell, Jr.	Late Pleistocene	Talara Tar Seeps	Peru	An Accipitridae, transferred to the genus Buteogallus Lesson, 1830 by Suárez et Olson, 2009, this is the type species of the new genus.	
Nannonetta invisitata	Gen. nov. et Sp. nov.	Valid	Kenneth E. Campbell, Jr.	Late Pleistocene	Talara Tar Seeps	Peru	An Anatidae, this is the type species of the new genus.	
Nucleornis insolitus	Gen. nov. et Sp. nov.	Valid	George G. Simpson	Miocene	Duinefontein	South Africa	A Spheniscidae, this is the type species of the new genus.	
Nuntius solitarius	Gen. nov. et Sp. nov.	Valid	Kenneth E. Campbell, Jr.	Late Pleistocene	Talara Tar Seeps	Peru	A Scolopacidae, this is the type species of the new genus.	
Oligocathartes olsoni	Gen. nov. et Sp. nov.	Valid	Colin J. O. Harrison Cyril A. Walker	Early Middle Oligocene	MP 21-23	UK	Described in the Catharthidae, but the holotype is too fragmentary for identification so best treated as Aves Incertae Sedis.	
Palaeopapia hamsteadiensis	Sp. nov.	Valid	Colin J. O. Harrison Cyril A. Walker	Early Middle Oligocene	MP 21-23	UK:	An Anseriformes Incertae Sedis.	
Paracathartes howardae	Gen. nov. et Sp. nov.	Valid	Colin J. O. Harrison	Early Eocene	Greybullian, Middle Wasatchian, Willwood Formation	USA (Wyoming)	Described as a Cathartidae, Houde 1988 placed it in the Lithornithiformes, Houde, 1988, Lithornithidae Houde, 1988, it is the type species of the new genus.	
Paracygnopterus scotti	Gen. nov. et Sp. nov.	Valid ?	Colin J. O. Harrison Cyril A. Walker	Early Middle Oligocene	MP 21–23	UK	An Anatidae, it is the type species of the new genus.	
Parvirallus gracilis	Sp. nov.	Valid	Colin J. O. Harrison Cyril A. Walker	Middle Eocene	MP 11-13	UK	A Rallidae.	
Percolinus proudlocki	Sp. nov.	Valid	Colin J. O. Harrison Cyril A. Walker	Middle Eocene	MP 11-13	UK	Described as a Phasianidae, transferred to the genus Talantatos Reichenbach, 1852 and placed in the Cariamidae door Mlíkovský, 2002.	
Phalacrocorax tanzaniae	Sp. nov.	Valid	Colin J. O. Harrison Cyril A. Walker	Early-Middle Pleistocene	Kamasian	Tanzania	A Phalacrocoracidae.	
Porzana estramosi	Sp. nov.	Valid	Dénes Jánossy	Middle Miocene	MN 6-8	Hungary	A Rallidae.	
Proanser major	Gen. nov. et Sp. nov.	Valid	A. S. Umanskaya	Late Miocene	MN 11	Ukraine	An Anatidae, it is the type species of the new genus.	
Proardeola walkeri	Gen. nov. et Sp. nov.	Valid	Colin J. O. Harrison	Early Miocene	MN 2a	France	An Ardeidae, it is the type species of the new genus.	
Proceriavis martini	Gen. nov. et Sp. nov.	Valid ?	Colin J. O. Harrison Cyril A. Walker	Early Middle Oligocene	MP 21-23	UK	Described as an Eleutherornithidae, based on a fragment of a cervical vertebra, best treated as Aves Incertae Sedis, it is the type species of the new genus.	
Sarcoramphus? fisheri	Sp. nov.	Valid	Kenneth E. Campbell, Jr.	Late Pleistocene	Talara Tar Seeps	Peru	A Cathartidae, not certain to be a Sarcoramphus Duméril, 1806.	
Scolopax baranensis	Sp. nov.	Valid	Dénes Jánossy	Early Pliocene	MN 15	Hungary	A Scolopacidae.	
Steganopus graui	Sp. nov.	Valid	Kenneth E. Campbell, Jr.	Late Pleistocene	Talara Tar Seeps	Peru	A Phalaropodidae.	
Syrigma sanctimartini	Sp. nov.	Valid	Kenneth E. Campbell, Jr.	Late Pleistocene	Talara Tar Seeps	Peru	An Ardeidae.	
Theristicus wetmorei	Sp. nov.	Valid	Kenneth E. Campbell, Jr.	Late Pleistocene	Talara Tar Seeps	Peru	A Threskiornithidae.	
Thinocorus koepckeae	Sp. nov.	Valid	Kenneth E. Campbell, Jr.	Late Pleistocene	Talara Tar Seeps	Peru	A Thinocoridae.	
Tringa ameghini	Sp. nov.	Valid	Kenneth E. Campbell, Jr.	Late Pleistocene	Talara Tar Seeps	Peru	A Scolopacidae.	
Turdoides borealis	Sp. nov.	Valid ?	Dénes Jánossy	Early Pliocene	MN 15	Hungary	The holotype is a heavily eroded proximal part of a left humerus, best placed in Passeriformes Incertae Sedis.	
Valenticarbo praetermissus	Gen. nov. et Sp. nov.	Valid ?	Colin J. O. Harrison	Late Pliocene	Siwalik complex	India	A Phalacrocoracidae, this is the type species of the new genus.	
Viator picis	Gen. nov. et Sp. nov.	Valid	Kenneth E. Campbell, Jr.	Late Pleistocene	Talara Tar Seeps	Peru	A Charadriidae, this is the type species of the new genus.	

== Plesiosaurs ==
Name	Novelty	Status	Authors	Age	Type locality	Location	Notes	Images
Dravidosaurus	Gen et sp nov	Valid	Yadagiri & Ayyasami	Cretaceous; Coniacian	Trichinopoly Group	India	Either a Plesiosaur or Stegosaur	

== Synapsids ==
Name	Novelty	Status	Authors	Age	Type locality	Location	Notes	Images
Aycrossia	Gen et sp nov	valid	Bown	Eocene; Bridgerian	Aycross Formation	US; Wyoming	An Omomyid primate The type species is A. lovei	
Gazinius	Gen et sp nov	valid	Bown	Eocene; Bridgerian		US; Wyoming	An Omomyid primate The type species is G. amplus	
Strigorhysis	Gen et sp nov	valid	Bown	Eocene; Bridgerian	Aycross Formation	US; Wyoming	An Omomyid primate The type species is S. bridgerensis	

== Expeditions, field work, and fossil discoveries ==
- While volunteering for field work on a team led by Philip Currie, Darren Tanke learned about the lost "Eoceratops" first excavated by William Edmund Cutler. Tanke would later rediscover the specimen in London's Natural History Museum.
