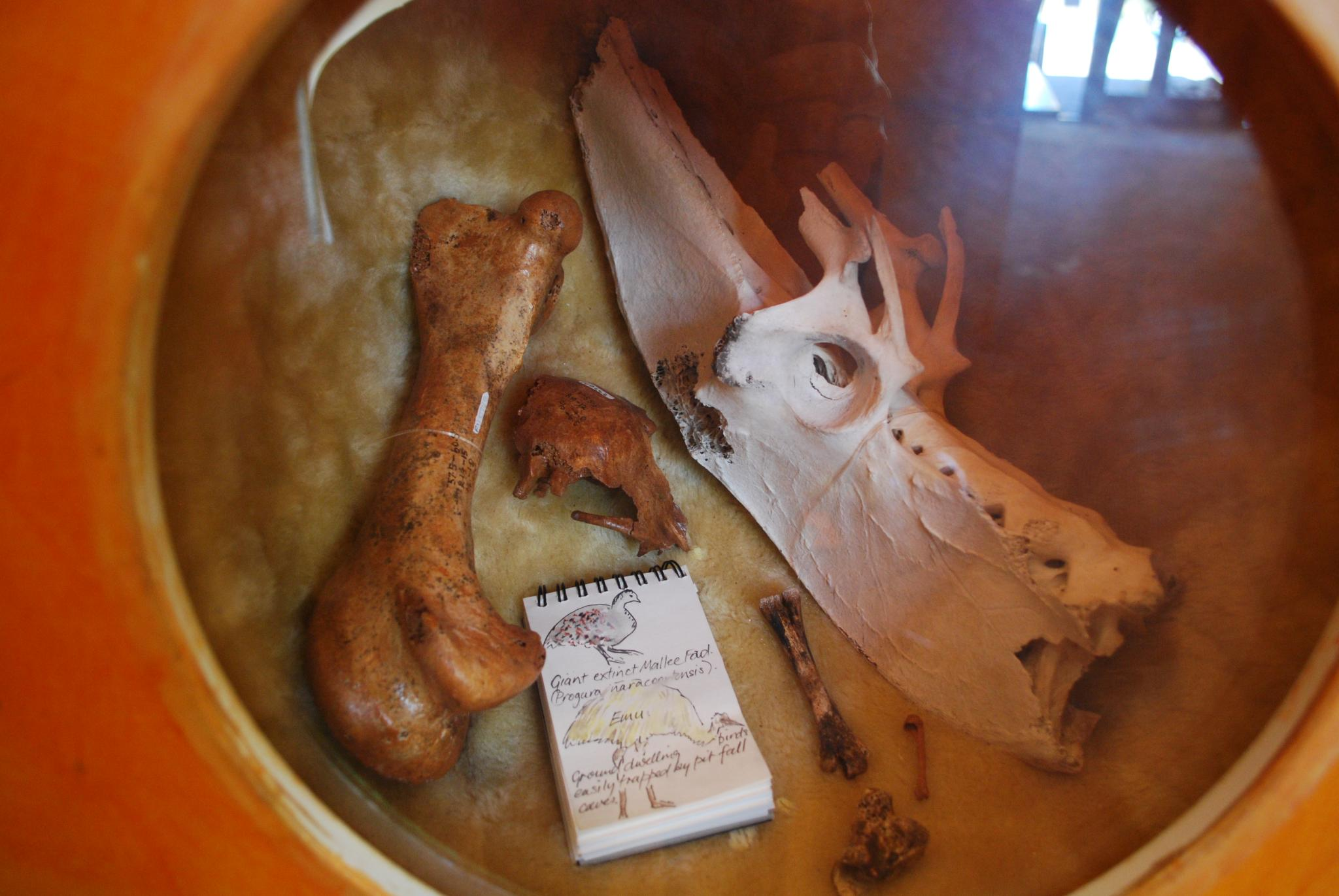
- Fossil remains from the Naracoote Caves

Scientific classification
- Kingdom: Animalia
- Phylum: Chordata
- Class: Aves
- Order: Galliformes
- Family: Megapodiidae
- Genus: †Progura (De Vis, 1888)

Species
- † P. gallinacea; † P. campestris

= Giant malleefowl =

Giant malleefowl Temporal range: Pliocene–Pleistocene

Extinct species of bird

Progura is an extinct genus of megapode that was native to Australia. It was described from Plio-Pleistocene deposits at the Darling Downs and Chinchilla in southeastern Queensland by Charles De Vis.

== Taxonomy ==
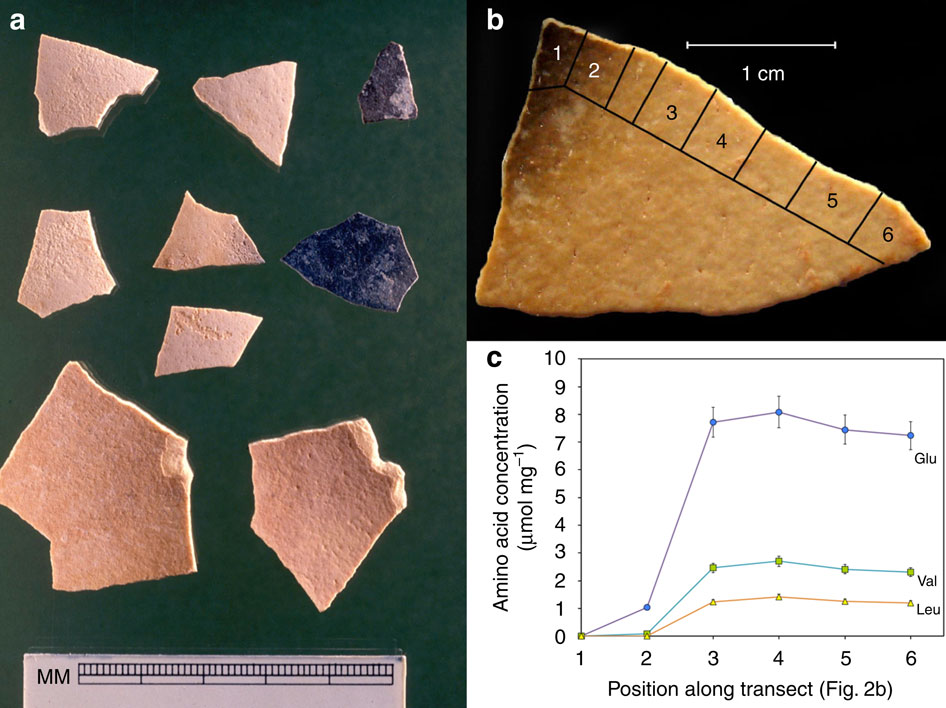
Eggshell

Comparison of Australian megapodes showed that Progura was closely related to the living malleefowl (Leipoa ocellata), though the fossil species P. gallinacea was considerably larger than the living one. A second species, P. naracoortensis, was described in 1974 by van Tets from deposits in the Naracoorte Caves of southeastern South Australia with differing size and leg proportions. It was formerly considered a synonym of P. gallinacea, on the grounds of sexual dimorphism. However in a 2017 review of Cenozoic megapodes, P. naracoortensis was found to be distinct from P. gallinacea and therefore reassigned to the genus Latagallina In the 2017 review, a new second species, Progura campestris was created for Pleistocene material from the Nullarbor Plain.

== Description ==
Its weight was estimated by van Tets to vary from 4–7 kg (8-15 lb). The proportions of the long bones were similar to, though larger and more robust than, those of the malleefowl, and it had a relatively broader bill, head and body. The deep keel on the sternum indicates that it was capable of flight. The thylacine may have been a predator of Progura, as it was adapted to killing large ground-dwelling birds (since its comparatively moderate bite force was more suited to hollow avian bones), such as the Tasmanian nativehen and Tasmanian emu.

== Eggs ==
Eggs previously assigned to Genyornis are now considered to have belonged to the giant malleefowl. Therefore, data on dromornithid diet and chronology can actually be ascribed to this bird, instead. It is believed that P. gallinacea buried its eggs in warm sand or soil.
