= Barawertornis =

Barawertornis Temporal range: Late Oligocene–Early Miocene Possible Middle Miocene record

Scientific classification
- Kingdom: Animalia
- Phylum: Chordata
- Class: Aves
- Superorder: Galloanserae
- Family: †Dromornithidae
- Genus: †Barawertornis; Rich, 1979
- Species: †B. tedfordi

Binomial name
- †Barawertornis tedfordi Rich, 1979

Extinct genus of dromornithid

Barawertornis is an extinct genus of cassowary-sized dromornithid known from Oligocene and Miocene deposits in Queensland and South Australia. Only a single species, B. tedfordi, is placed in this genus. It shows adaptations towards a cursorial lifestyle. Like other dromornithids, Barawertornis was probably a folivorous and frugivorous browser.

== History and naming ==
In 1968, the fragmentary remains of a dromornithid were reported from the Carl Creek Limestone of Riversleigh, Queensland by American palaeontologist Richard H. Tedford. Some of these remains, in addition to others, were used by Patricia Vickers-Rich in 1979 as the basis for a new genus and species, Barawertornis tedfordi. The holotype (CPC 7341) is a left femur missing the trochanter and most of the shaft. Additional fossils include a partial femur, incomplete tarsometatarsus and nearly complete dorsal vertebra. Twenty-five years later, in 2004, Peter Murray and Patricia Vickers-Rich briefly described fragmentary tibiotarsi, and tentatively referred a synsacral fragment and phalanges from South Australia to the taxon. More fragmentary hindlimb material was described in 2010, and were used to test previously published theories on relationships within Dromornithidae. A study published in 2016 by Trevor Worthy and colleagues referred skull material to Barawertornis.

The genus name is a combination of an Aboriginal word for "ground" (Barawerti), although no particular language was specified, and the Ancient Greek ornis ("bird"). The species name was chosen to honour Richard H. Tedford, for their discoveries of tertiary avian fauna in Australia.

== Description ==
=== Postcrania ===
The femur has a shallow femoral head and a long femoral neck. The shaft is slender and compressed from front to back (craniocaudally). A caudal intermuscular line is present in most femurs referred to Barawertornis, but is absent in QM F30352. Instead, a small protuberance is found where this ridge should be. Coupled with the lack of fused condyles, undeveloped popliteal fossa and the porous nature of the bone, this specimen likely represents a still growing individual. Both femoral condyles have a moderate depth. The external condyle is less wider than the internal condyle, being one-third of its width. In proximal view, the lateral articular facet of the tibiotarsus is dome-like, whereas the medial articular facet is flat. The shaft of the tibiotarsus is slightly curved from side-to-side (mediolaterally). Its caudal surface is nearly planar, with the distal end being slightly convex. The medial condyle is broader than the lateral condyle. In the tarsometatarsus, the medial cotyle is shallower than the lateral cotyle. Not much is known about the shaft as they're either not preserved or are heavily damaged. A distal vascular foramen is present in B. tedfordi, but absent in most specimens of Dromornis stirtoni. The fossa metatarsi I is absent. Both the trochlea metatarsi II and IV are planar in dorsal view. Trochlea metatarsi III has a moderate to greater dorsal projection than the other trochlea.

=== Skull ===
Apart from its smaller size, the cranium of Barawertornis differs from that of Ilbandornis woodburnei in that the insertion for the superficial and medial external jaw abductor muscles is divided into two distinct parts. The pterygoid has a dorsal process that runs above the quadrate articulation, which is a feature also seen in Dromornis planei. The mandible lacks the caudal mandibular fenestra. The retroarticular process is deep and robust. Although the rostrum isn't known, it probably resembled that of Genyornis as its mandibles were similarly slender and dorsoventrally narrow.

=== Size ===
B. tedfordi is currently the smallest known species of dromornithid, comparable in size to the cassowaries and ranging in weight from 26.9 to 79 kg (59.3 to 174.1 lbs).

== Classification ==
In its description, Barawertornis was assigned to the family Dromornithidae and placed within its own subfamily Barawertornithinae. Nguyen et al. (2010) performed phylogenetic analyses to test the relationships of B. tedfordi, most of which recovered it as the basalmost dromornithid or sister taxon to the group containing Ilbandornis woodburnei, Bullockornis planei, Bu. sp. and Dromornis stirtoni. The authors, however, preferred the results of the strict parsimonious tree, which found it to be in a trichotomous relationship with the I. lawsoni-G. newtoni group and all other dromornithids, as it reflects the uncertain position of B. tedfordi.

- Dromornithidae
  - - Barawertornis tedfordi
    - - - Bullockornis sp.
        - Ilbandornis woodburnei
      - - Bullockornis planei
        - Dromornis stirtoni
  - - Ilbandornis lawsoni
    - Genyornis newtoni

- Dromornithidae
  - - Barawertornis tedfordi
    - - - Ilbandornis lawsoni
        - Genyornis newtoni
      - - - Bullockornis sp.
          - Ilbandornis woodburnei
        - - Bullockornis planei
          - - Dromornis stirtoni

Worthy et al. (2016) suggested that Barawertornis may have been part of the Ilbandornis lineage, due to the remarkable similarities of the crania. The lineage first appeared during the Late Oligocene/Early Miocene, attained maximum diversity in the Middle/Late Miocene and became extinct during the Late Pleistocene.

== Paleobiology ==
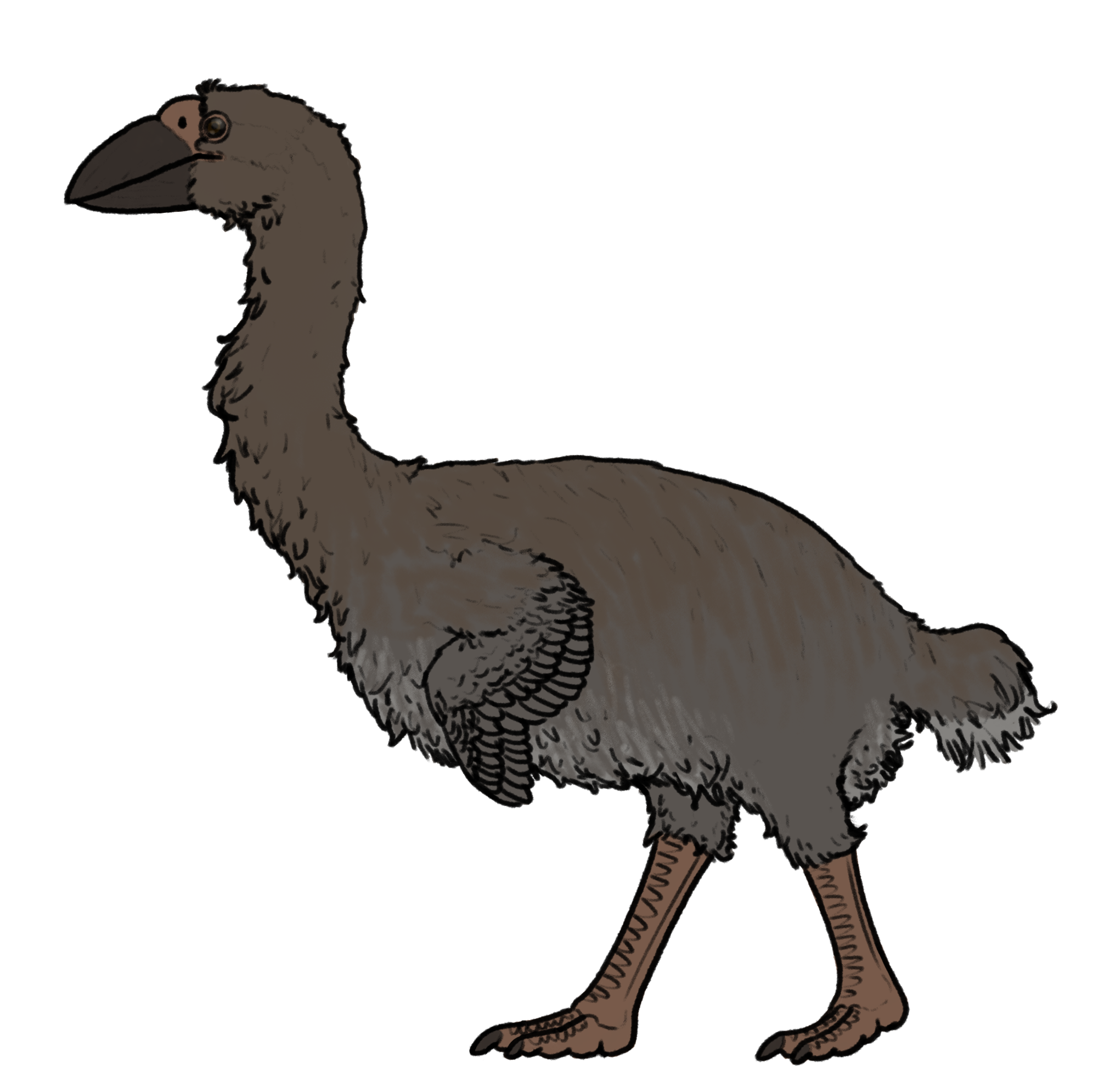
Speculative life restoration

=== Diet ===
Not much of the skull is known, so no direct observations about its possible feeding habits can be inferred. Dromornithids are thought to have been browsers that fed on soft foods, such as leaves, new growth and fruit. Small gastroliths, stones that are swallowed to help aid in digestion, have been found in a few specimens of Genyornis and Dromornis murrayi. A study published in 2024 by Phoebe McInerney and colleagues noted that Genyornis, and likely all dromornithids, showed adaptations to an aquatic feeding style.

=== Locomotion ===
The femora of Barawertornis are proportionally shorter and stouter than those of the emu and ostrich, but are more gracile compared to most dromornithids. The proportions of the hindlimbs are most similar to that of the southern cassowary. This suggests that it would have been less cursorial than most ratites, but capable of running at a reasonable speed.

=== Paleopathology ===
Nguyen et al. (2010) reported pathologies in a femur and tarsometatarsus of Barawertornis. The femur shows unhealed bite marks and fractures, to which the authors hypothesised were likely caused by a predator such as the crocodilian Baru. A series of gouges are present on a heavily damaged tarsometatarsus. Although the exact cause is not known, it has been suggested that either predators, scavengers or animals trampling on the bone were what caused them.

== Paleoenvironment ==
=== Riversleigh WHA ===
Barawertornis is known from several Late Oligocene and Early Miocene limestone deposits at the Riversleigh World Heritage Area (WHA) in northwestern Queensland. At the time of the Late Oligocene, the area was covered in open forests. These forests would have featured sclerophyllous vegetation and deciduous vine thickets. As the climate warmed during the Early Miocene, open forests were then replaced by gallery rainforest. The environment was similar to mid-montane New Guinea and northern Australia. B. tedfordi coexisted alongside its larger relative, Dromornis murrayi.

=== Wipajiri Formation ===
Fossils attributable to this taxon have also been reported from the Leaf Locality of the Wipajiri Formation, northern South Australia. The precise age of the site is uncertain, with studies suggesting that it was either Early or Middle Miocene. Little is also known about its environment, with researchers suggesting that it could have either been temperate wet forest or an, as yet, unknown, drier environment.
