= Lake Callabonna =

Lake in South Australia

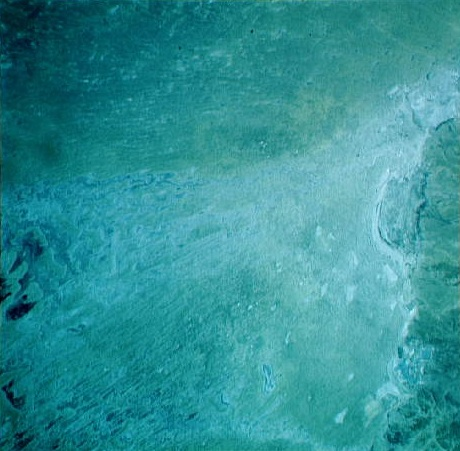
- Lake Callabonna from space

- Location in South Australia
- Location: Far North, South Australia
- Coordinates: 29°43′S 140°05′E
- Type: Salt lake
- Basin countries: Australia
- Designation: Strzelecki Regional Reserve (only partially); Lake Callabonna Fossil Reserve
- Surface area: 160 km^{2} (62 sq mi)

Lake Callabonna is a dry salt lake with little to no vegetation in the Far North region of South Australia. The 160-square-kilometre (62 sq mi) lake is situated approximately 120 kilometres (75 mi) southwest of Cameron Corner, the junction of South Australia, Queensland and New South Wales. It is also known as Lake Mulligan. The lake is an important site for late Pleistocene fossils. It is within the extent of the Strzelecki Desert Lakes Important Bird Area, which is important for waterbirds when holding water in the aftermath of floods.

== History ==
The first pastoralists in the area were the Ragless brothers in 1881, who moved there from the northern Flinders Ranges, opening a sheep-run. The station owner in 1892, F. B. Ragless, was shown a number of giant fossilised skeletons embedded in the dry surface of the lake, discovered two days before by an Aboriginal station hand named Jackie Nolan. The South Australian Museum sent a worker, H. Hurst, to investigate the site. Four months later the results were delivered to the museum.

After examination of the fossilised skeletons an expedition funded by Sir Thomas Elder and E. C. Stirling, director of the South Australian Museum, was organised, and Hurst led the team back to the site. After several visits, Stirling and A. H. C. Zietz collected a large number of diprotodon and dromornithidae fossilised skeletons. The area was designated a Fossil Reserve in 1901. Access is restricted.

== Location and geography ==
Lake Callabonna is a salt lake situated approximately 120 kilometres (75 mi) southwest of Cameron Corner, the junction of South Australia, Queensland and New South Wales. It is also known as Lake Mulligan. It covers around 160 square kilometres (62 sq mi).

Hamilton Creek, an intermittent creek starting high in the Mawson Plateau, occasionally flows into the lake, after first deviating north-east to Moolawatana Station, before swinging south-east.

== Protected area status ==
The lake is a protected area.

=== Strzelecki Regional Reserve ===
The northern end of Lake Callabonna is within the boundary of the Strzelecki Regional Reserve.

=== Lake Callabonna Fossil Reserve ===
Lake Callabonna is the location of a site where the articulated skeletons of Diprotodon, an extinct genus of marsupial, were found in the late 19th century by the South Australian Museum. The site is considered to have a very high palaeontological significance. A fossil reserve was dedicated in 1901 under state law, which is in force, as the Crown Lands Act 1929. Administrative responsibility lies with the South Australian Museum.

The lake was listed on the South Australian Heritage Register in February 1997, for its palaeontological significance.

In 2002, the museum pointed out that the lake received "negligible management effort as a Fossil Reserve under the Crown Lands Act 1929", and that proclamation under the National Parks and Wildlife Act 1972 may provide a higher level of protection against "degradation arising from uncontrolled access".

== Birds ==
The lake lies is within the extent of the Strzelecki Desert Lakes Important Bird Area, identified as such by BirdLife International because of its importance for waterbirds when holding water in the aftermath of floods.

== See also ==
- Genyornis newtoni, a species of large flightless bird which lived at Lake Callabonna

General:

- List of lakes of Australia § South Australia
- List of fossil parks
