= Strzelecki Desert Lakes Important Bird Area =

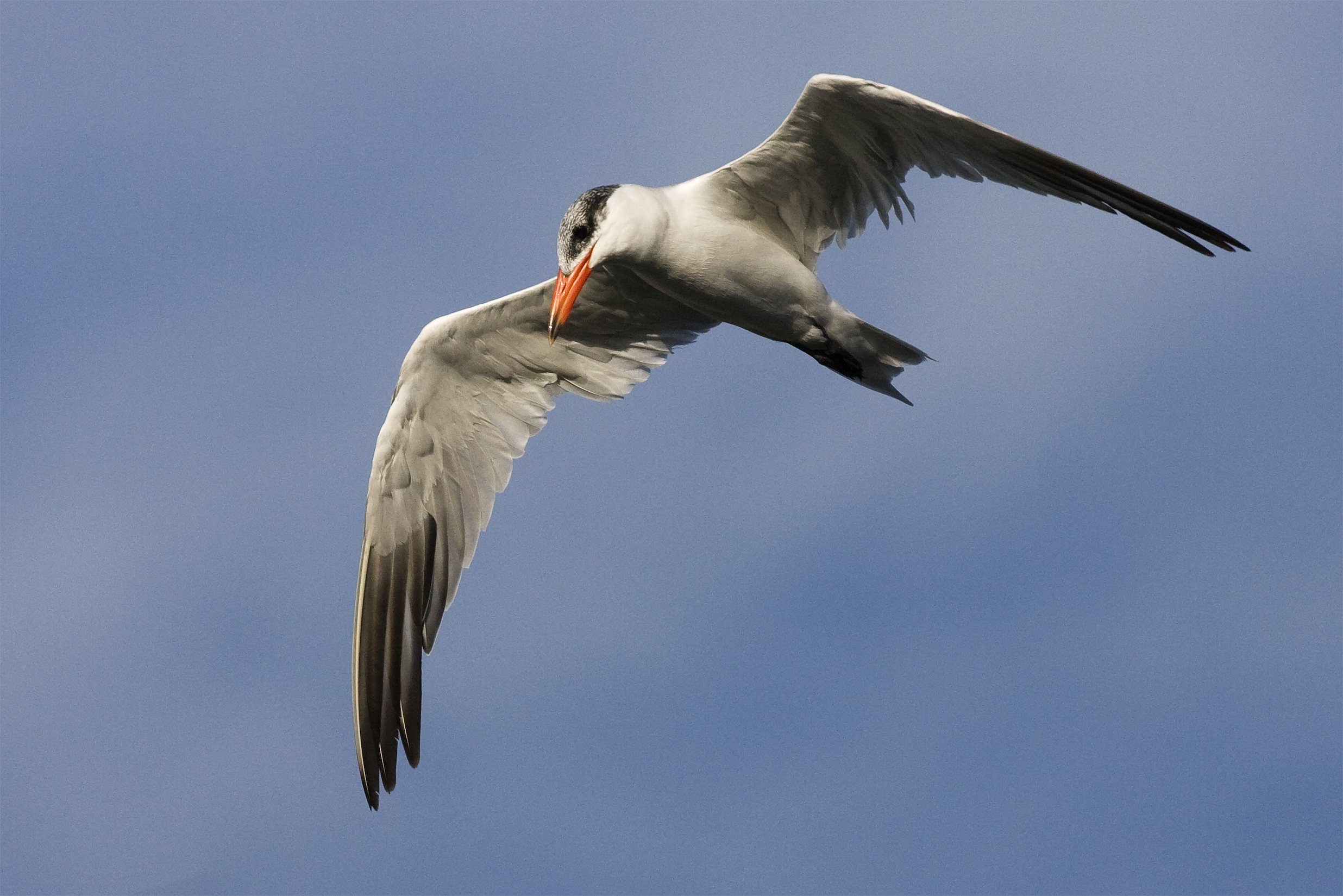
- The IBA is an important area for Caspian terns

- Coordinates: 29°03′42″S 139°23′26″E
- Country: Australia
- State: South Australia

Area
  - Total: 2,342 km^{2} (904 sq mi)

The Strzelecki Desert Lakes Important Bird Area is an Important Bird Area (IBA) in the Australian state of South Australia which consists of a series of ephemeral waterbodies in the arid Strzelecki Desert in the state's Far North region. It is considered to be important for waterbirds when its constituent lakes hold water in the aftermath of floods.

== Description ==
The 2,342-square-kilometre (904 sq mi) Important Bird Area consists of a chain of lakes, of varying levels of salinity, on the lower Cooper and Strzelecki Creeks in north-eastern South Australia. The site is defined by the maximum extent of the Cooper Creek floodplain from Lakes Hope and Appadare to Lakes Killalpaninna, Kooperamanna and Killamperpunna, as well as Lakes Gregory, Blanche and Callabonna. Although the creek systems flood irregularly, water may persist in the lakes for several years.

== Criteria for nomination as an IBA ==
The site has been identified by BirdLife International as an IBA because it has supported significant numbers of freckled and pink-eared ducks, grey teals, hardheads, Australian pelicans, banded stilts, red-necked avocets and Caspian terns. It also supports populations of Eyrean grasswrens, black honeyeaters, banded whitefaces, chirruping wedgebills and cinnamon quail-thrushes.

== Associated protected areas ==
While the IBA has no statutory status, it does overlap the Strzelecki Regional Reserve declared by the South Australian government.

== See also ==
- List of birds of South Australia
- Strzelecki (disambiguation)
