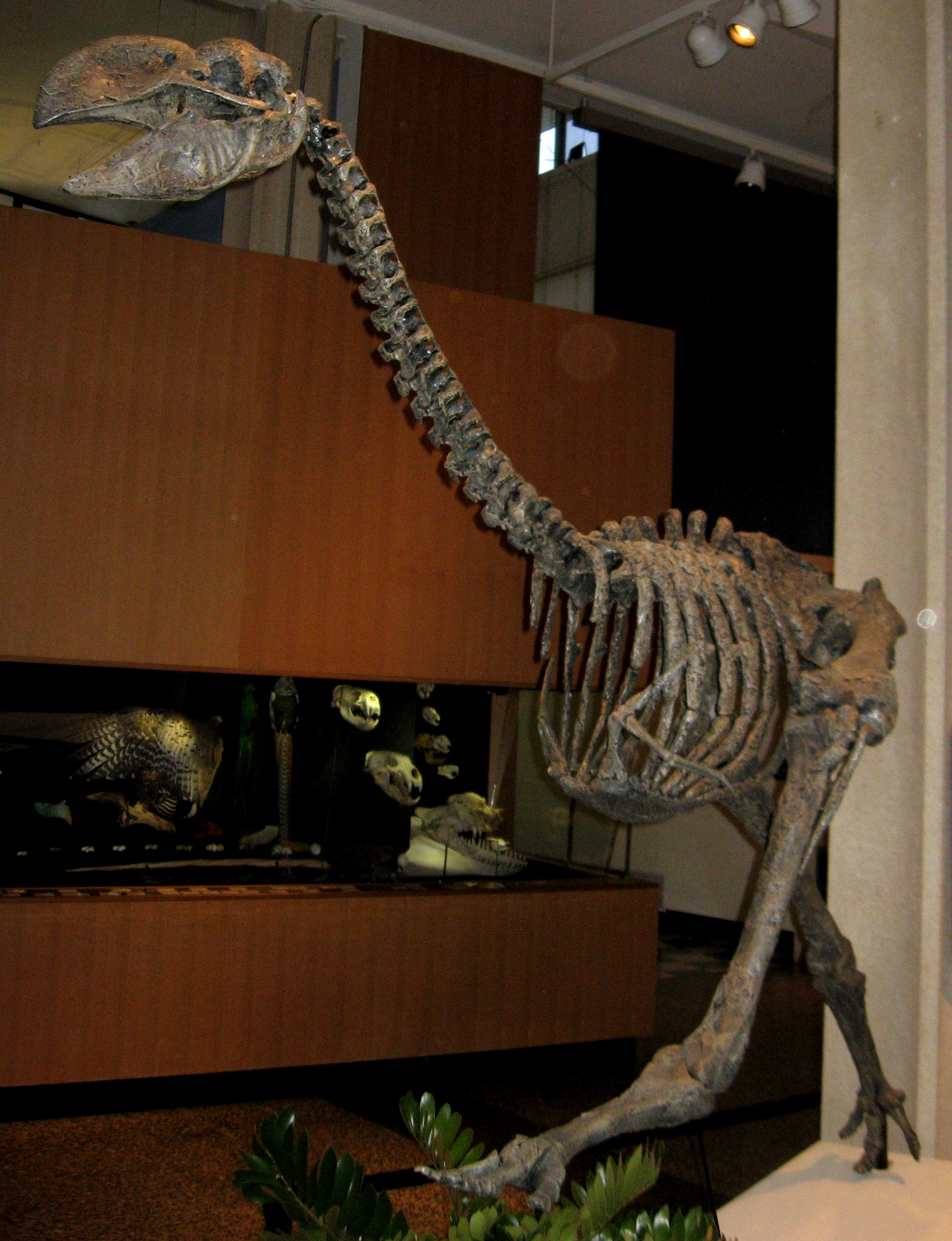
- Cast of Dromornis stirtoni from Australia

Scientific classification
- Kingdom: Animalia
- Phylum: Chordata
- Class: Aves
- Superorder: Galloanserae
- Family: †Dromornithidae
- Genus: †Dromornis; Owen, 1872

Type species
- Dromornis australis Owen, 1872

Species
- †D. australis Owen, 1872; †D. murrayi Worthy et al., 2016; †D. planei (Rich, 1979); †D. stirtoni Rich, 1979

Synonyms
- Bullockornis Rich, 1979

= Dromornis =

Dromornis Temporal range: Late Oligocene–Pliocene

Extinct genus of birds

Dromornis is a genus of large prehistoric birds native to Australia during the Oligocene to Pliocene epochs. The species were flightless, possessing greatly reduced wing structures but with large legs, similar to the modern ostrich or emu. They were likely to have been predominantly, if not exclusively, herbivorous browsers. The male of the largest species, Dromornis stirtoni, is a contender for the tallest and heaviest bird, and possibly exhibited aggressive territorial behaviour. They belong to the family Dromornithidae, extinct flightless birds known as mihirungs.

== Taxonomy ==
The genus was erected to separate a new species, Dromornis australis, from the previously described Dinornis (giant moas), another lineage of ancient large and flightless birds found in New Zealand that was earlier described by Richard Owen in 1843. A femur that was forwarded to England, probably a dromornithid and since lost, suggested an Australian genus, but Owen withheld publication for many years. The type specimen, another femur, was found in a 55-metre-deep (180 ft) well at Peak Downs, Queensland, and subsequently described by Owen in 1872. Owen's new taxon was published in a series on prehistoric birds, read before the Zoological Society of London then appearing in its Transactions. The name of the genus is derived from Ancient Greek, δρόμος (drómos), meaning a course, a race, and ὄρνις (órnis), a bird.

The genus and family are referred to as mihirung, distinguishing these birds from the giant emus. 'Mihirung paringmal' is an Aboriginal term from the Tjapwuring people of Western Victoria and it means 'giant bird'.

The placement of these dromornithid species may be summarised as

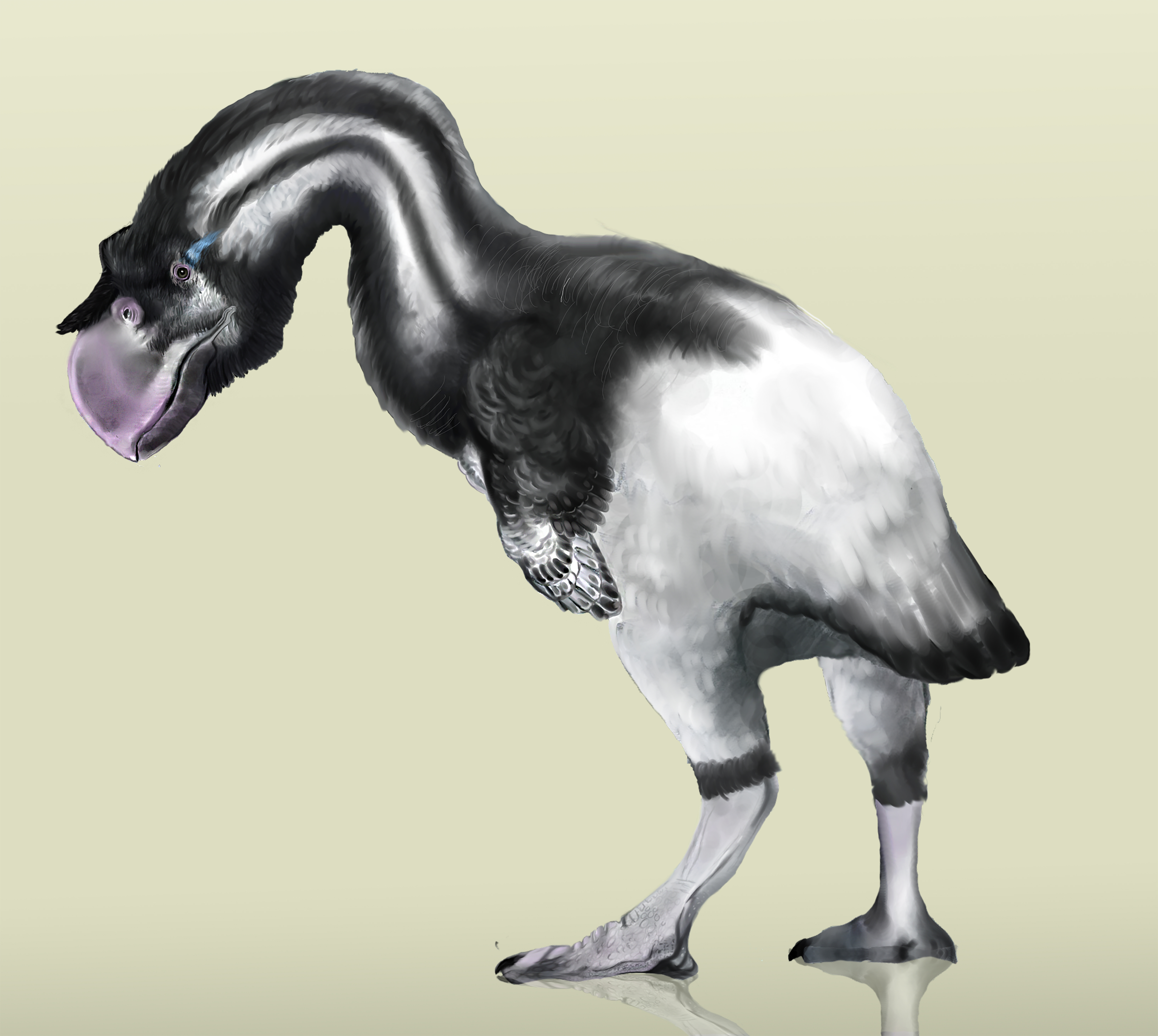
D. stirtoni, artist's impression

Dromornithidae (8 extinct species in 4 genera)

- Dromornis

- Dromornis australis Owen, 1872
- Dromornis murrayi Worthy et al., 2016
- Dromornis planei (Bullockornis planei Rich, 1979)
- Dromornis stirtoni Rich, 1979

- Barawertornis
- Ilbandornis
- Genyornis

The Dromornis lineage is proposed to represent a monotypic succession, from earliest to latest these are D. murrayi, D. planei, D. stirtoni, and the type species, D. australis.

The dromornithid family are sometimes known by appellations such as Stirton's mihirung (D. stirtoni) to refer to each species. Nicknames describing the species as 'thunderbirds' etc. have appeared in reports of their discovery, later terms such as "demon ducks" refer to their relationship to the extant waterfowl of the galloanseres.

== Description ==
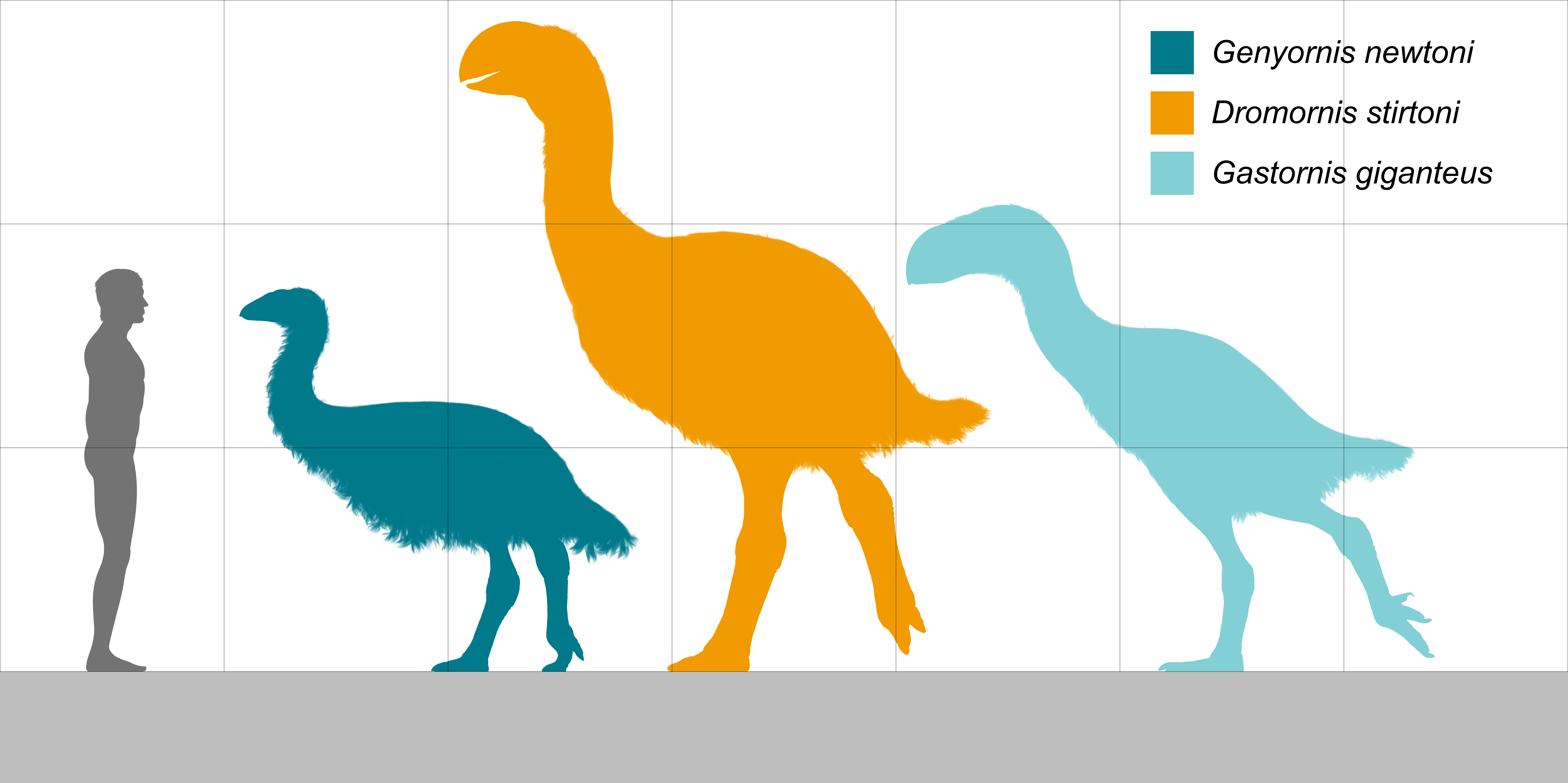
Size comparison of Dromornis stirtoni, alongside fellow dromornithid Genyornis and Gastornis, another large flightless anserimorph

Dromornis is a genus of large to gigantic flightless birds of the Dromornithidae family. Members of this family lived from 8 million years ago until less than 30,000 years ago. Although they looked like giant emus, Dromornis and its relatives are more closely related to the earliest waterfowl of the Anseriformes order or a basal galliform. Comparative studies using endocranial reconstructions of dromornithids, Ilbandornis and three Dromornis species, suggest that the head and bill of the Dromornis lineage became foreshortened.

The species resemble large birds of the Northern hemisphere, the Paleognathaes, of whom some descendants are known as ostriches and their allies. Like those ratites who also evolved alongside mammals, the diversity of species was very low, apparently monotypes that emerged in succession and increased in size.

Dromornis stirtoni is amongst the largest known birds, although Aepyornis maximus, a species of elephant bird from Madagascar, were likely just as heavy, if not heavier. The height of D. stirtoni would probably have met or exceeded the females of the tallest species of the genus Dinornis, the giant moa of New Zealand. (Some moa exhibited sexual dimorphism, with females tending to be larger than males.)

Eggs assigned to this genus are estimated at 30–34 cm (12–13 in) in length and 24–29 cm (9.4–11.4 in) in width, with an estimated mass of 12.6–14.7 kg (28–32 lb) which would be one of the largest known bird eggs.

== Species ==
=== D. australis ===
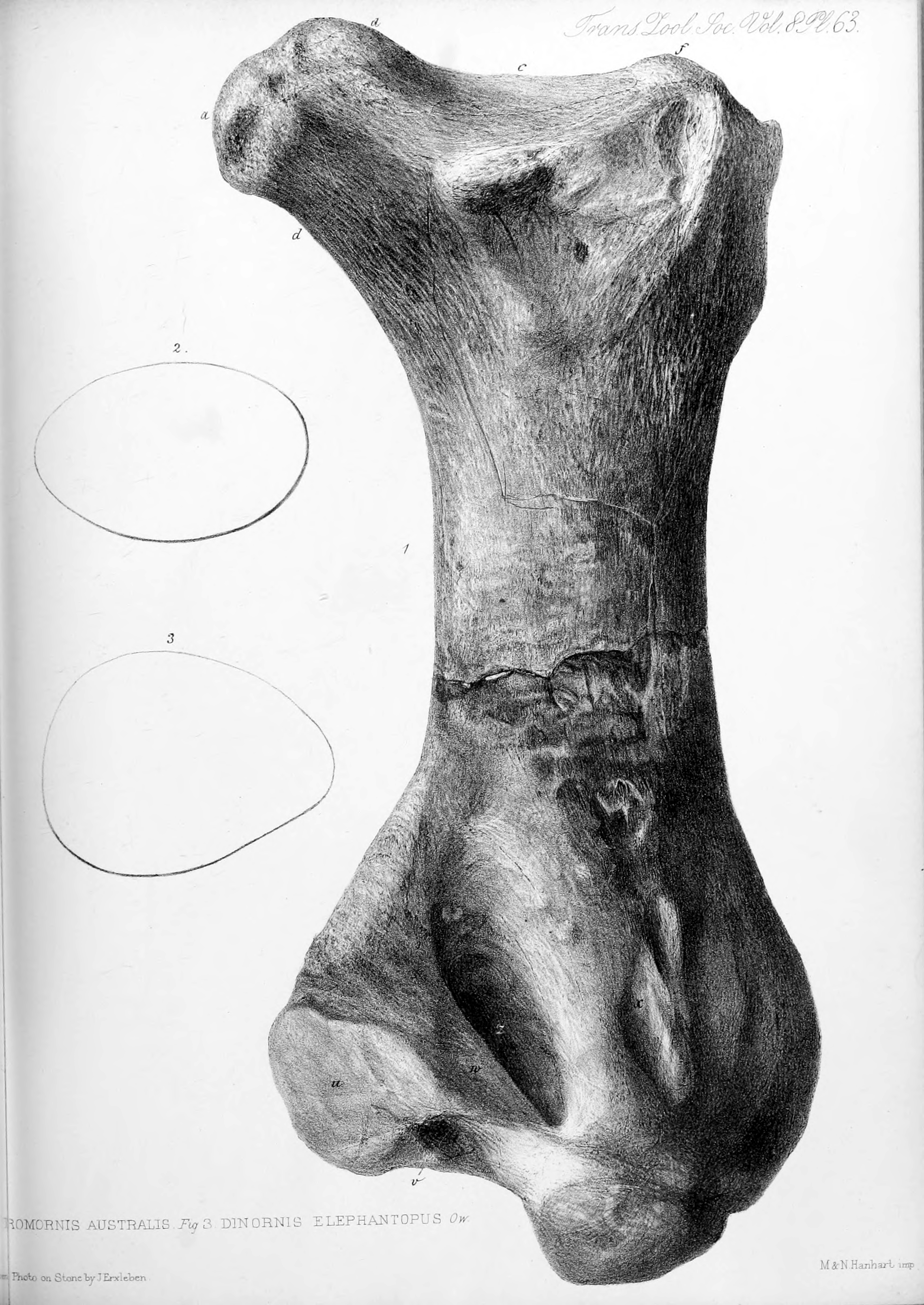
Photolithograph of the holotype specimen

Dromornis australis fossils are found in Pliocene deposits of Australia. They were once considered the smallest species of the genus Dromornis, around three quarters the size of Dromornis stirtoni, until the discovery of Dromornis planei specimens were described in 2016. Mass estimates range from 133 to 208 kg.

==== Discovery ====
The fossil remains of a large femur were discovered at Peak Downs in Queensland, at a depth of around 55 metres (180 ft) in a well shaft. This type of locality was described as an assemblage of boulders and pebbles beneath around thirty feet of alluvial soil; the femur was located over a boulder in the rock beds. The description of Dromornis australis by Richard Owen, best known for extensive work on the paleontology of Australian mammals, was the first of an extinct Australian avian species.

Owen had previously sought evidence of Dinornis in the palaeontological collections of early Australian excavations. A femur that he had noted in the appendix of Thomas Mitchell's explorations, found in a cave, did not allow him to confirm an alliance with any previously described species of large flightless birds. Owen withheld describing that specimen, now thought lost, until the type for this species emerged many years later. The new material had been found while digging a well at Peak Downs and forwarded to Owen via W. B. Clarke, a geologist employed by the state of New South Wales, with a remark by Gerard Krefft that placed it with the New Zealand moas of Dinornis. Richard Owen found affinities and distinctions in an osteological comparison to species of the extinct Dinornis and the extant Dromaius (the emu) and proposed that it represented a new genus.

==== Description ====
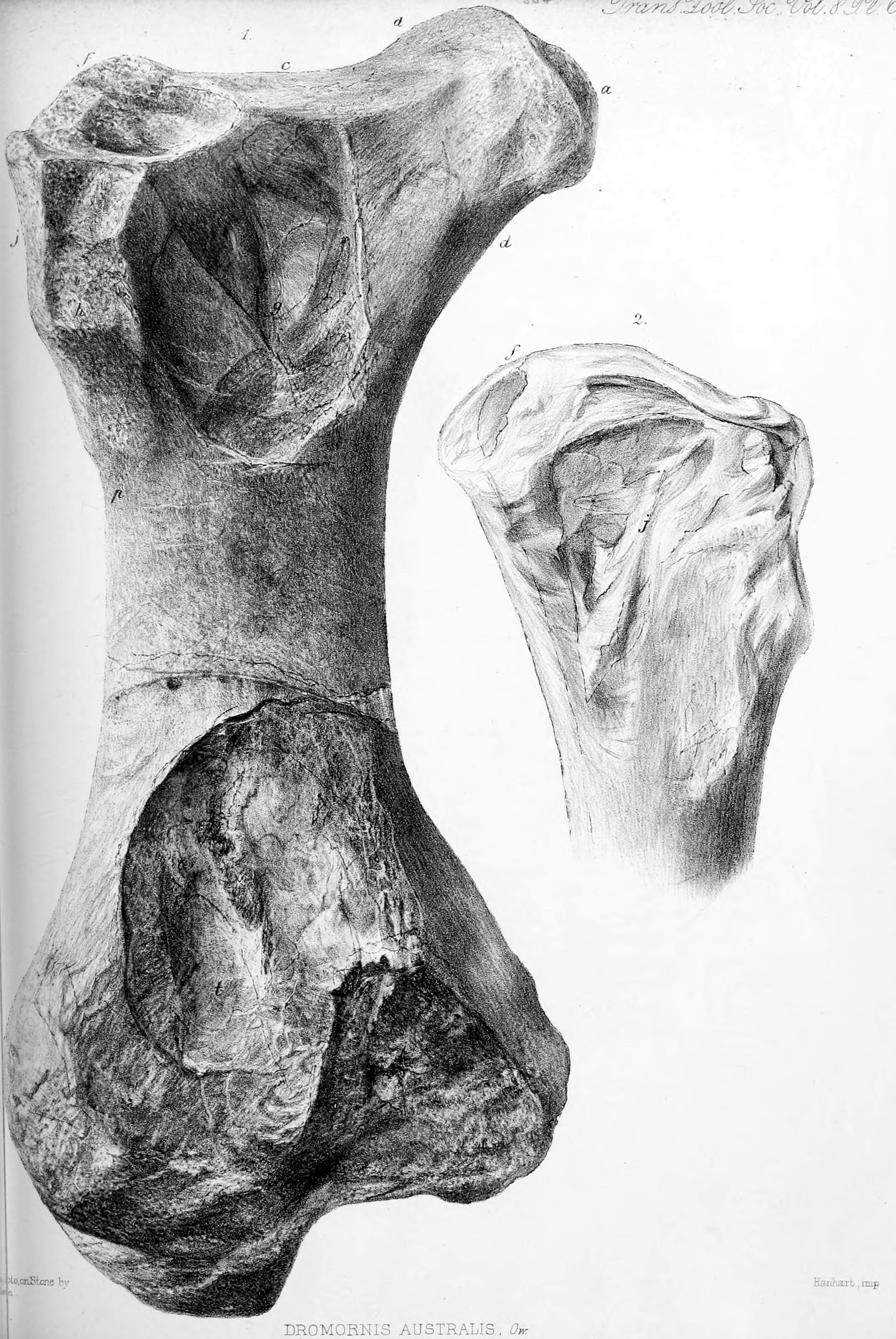
Second image accompanying Owen's description

The species is known by the right femur, around twelve inches long, obtained at the Peak Downs site. The details of its deposition accompanied Owen's description, "The well was sunk through 30 feet of the black trappean alluvial soil common in that part of Australia, and then through 150 feet of drift pebbles and boulders, on one of which boulders ("at that depth," 150 feet?) rested a short, thick femur, so filled with mineral matter (calc spar and iron pyrites) as to give the internal structure more the appearance of a reptilian than an ornithic bone." Owen notes the specimen was reported by W. B. Clarke, attributing it to Dinornis, in the Geological Magazine several years before.

The femur is similar in size to Ilbandornis woodburnei, another dromornithid species. Other osteological features of the specimens have been compared to Dromornis stirtoni, the gigantic "Stirton's thunderbird".

A comparative analysis that included this femur indicated morphological characters assignable to either Dromornis or a continuation of a Ilbandornis woodburnei lineage, allied to more gracile species of the family, but these results were not considered to be necessarily characteristic to any dromornithid genera. A fragment of synsacrum found at the Canadian deep lead mine near Gulgong has been tentatively assigned to Dromornis, the slight possibility that it is referable to this species might represent the continuation of the lineage as a smaller species into the Pliocene.

=== D. murrayi ===
Dromornis murrayi was described in 2016 using specimens discovered amongst the Riversleigh fauna in Queensland, Australia. The period during which it existed was the Oligocene to early Miocene, making this the earliest known species of the genus Dromornis. The size of these mihirungs was also determined to be the smallest of its genus. Dromornis murrayi was described from specimens of cranial and post cranial material.

The type material is the partial remains of a cranium, which was obtained at a locality named Hiatus A Site in the Carl Creek Limestone Formation; this location is one of the numerous study sites at the Riversleigh World Heritage Area. The specimens were discovered by two of the collaborating authors, Michael Archer and Suzanne J. Hand, the head researchers of taxa at the celebrated Riversleigh site and its associated fauna.

==== Description ====
This species stood around 1.5 metres (4.9 ft) high and weighed up to 250 kilograms (550 lb), a considerable size but smaller than its congeners; the later species Dromornis stirtoni is determined to have been up to 650 kilograms (1,430 lb). The fossil specimens used to describe Dromornis murrayi have been dated to 26 million years ago, being discovered at a 'shelf', a rich layer of fossilised bones, that included leg and cranial remains of the unknown species.

Wings were greatly reduced, approximately 100–150 millimetres (3.9–5.9 in), and would not have been evident beneath the bird's plumage. The skull cavity held an exceptionally small brain, the description's leading author Trevor Worthy suggesting the comparison, "I mean, if a chicken was silly, these things were very much more silly."

==== Distribution ====
The fossil deposits of Dromornis murrayi at the Hiatus site of Riversleigh have been dated as early Miocene and another as late Oligocene to early Miocene. This was established using correlation with the evolutionary stage of vertebrate species known from other sites at Riversleigh. Hiatus site is limestone deposited in an aquatic setting, lacking indicators for methods such as radiometric dating. Another site where the species occurs is Cadbury's Kingdom, designated as Faunal Zone B which is also dated as early Miocene. The temporal range of these finds is approximately 25 to 16 mega-annum.

The only known occurrence of this species is amongst the Riversleigh fauna, the site is located in the northeastern region of the Australian continent.

=== D. planei ===
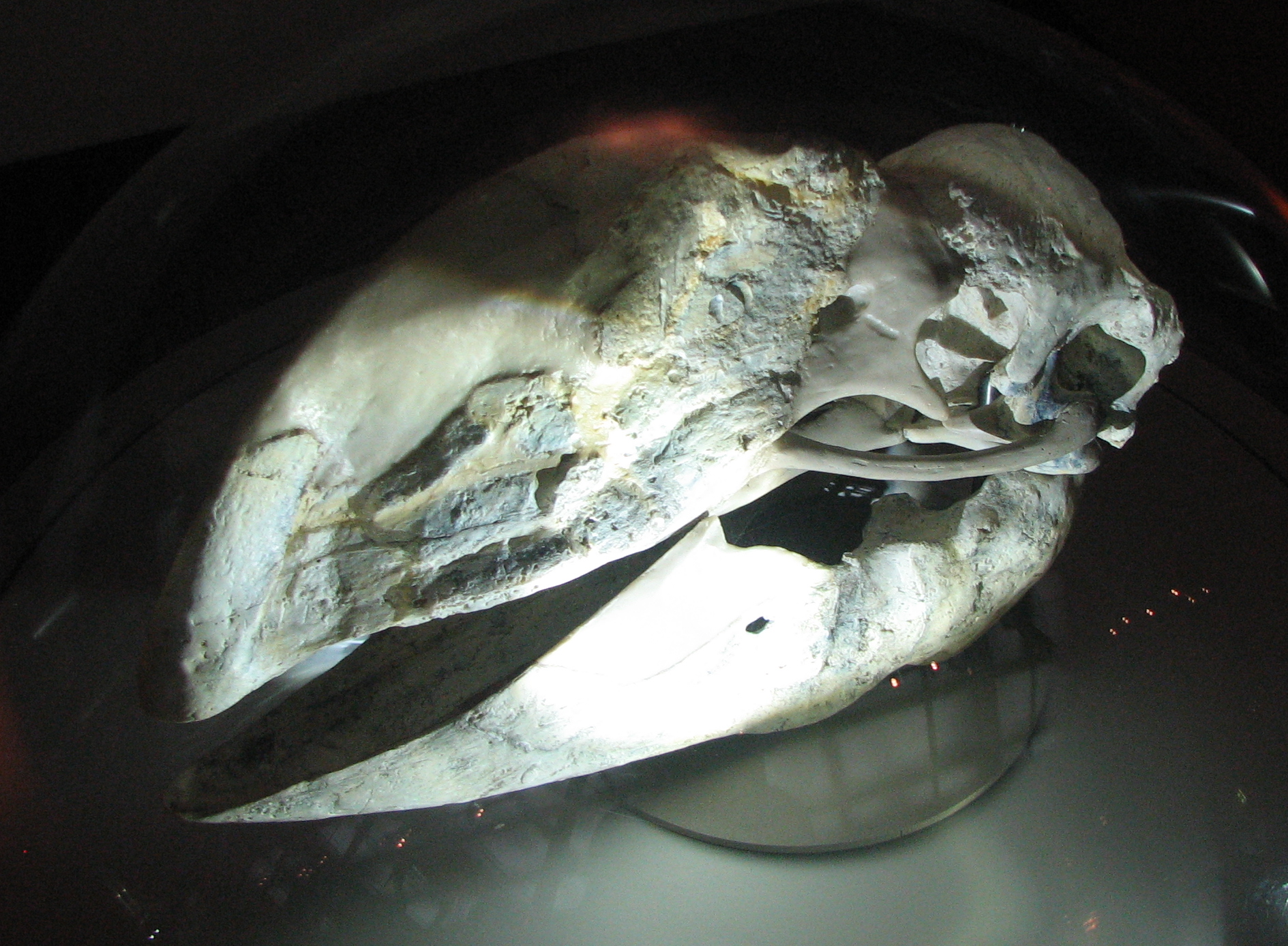
Skull of Dromornis planei

Dromornis planei, formerly placed in a separate genus Bullockornis, lived in the Middle Miocene, approximately 15 million years ago. It is known from specimens of the Bullock Creek fauna, fossils found in the Northern Territory of Australia. As large as an ostrich or emu, the species possessed a stocky build. A proposed common name, referring to its discoverer and locality, is Plane's bull bird. The site of its discovery was once semi-arid, containing low vegetation around seasonal wetlands and rivers.

The species was first described by Patricia Vickers-Rich in 1979, assigning it to a new genus Bullockornis. The description's first generic epithet was derived by a partial reference to the Bullock Creek Site and the greek word for bird ornis, and the common name bull bird proposed by the author for genus. The type is a fossilised section of the right femur, with other material, vertebrae and a rib, also referred to the same species. The specific epithet honours the discoverer of the vertebrae fossils, Michael Plane, thus the proposed trivial name of "Plane's Bull Bird". Plane had been the first to investigate the Bullock Creek site, details of which were published in a 1968 paper.

It was one of several species of mihirungs, the dromornithids, that share ancestry with ducks and geese. The nickname "Demon Duck of Doom" is a reference to the large bill and body of the species. Fossil specimens of this species and other mihirungs are common, but the example of a near complete skull discovered in the 1980s was an unusual find. The direct evidence of the beak structure was evaluated in debate over the diet and habits of dromornithids. The bird's generic name is improperly translated as "ox-bird", but was named instead for the type locality for the genus at Bullock Creek, Australia. In 2010, Nguyen and Boles first suggested that Bullockornis represents another species of Dromornis on the basis of many common traits observed in the cranial and postcranial skeleton of both taxa and their close relationship strongly supported by their phylogenetic analyses. Subsequent studies also agreed upon placing this species within the genus Dromornis.

Some paleontologists, including Peter Murray of the Central Australian Museum, believe that Bullockornis was related to geese and ducks. This, in addition to the bird's tremendous size and earlier misclassification as a carnivore, gave rise to its colourful nickname. It may be somewhat inaccurate, however, as other studies have recovered dromornithids as more closely related to Galliformes.

The existence of only this species at the Bullock Creek Site, as with the late Miocene Alcoota local fauna, correlates to the lack of diversity in large ratites, such as the evolution of the ostriches in the presence of a diversity of mammals.

==== Description ====
Dromornis planei was a very large flightless bird, similar in height to an ostrich or emu but with a heavier build; the species is however exceeded in size by the largest of these "thunder birds" Dromornis stirtoni. Its bill was curved and deep, the overall size of the head and skull was remarkably large. The species stood approximately 2.5 metres (8 ft 2 in) tall. It may have weighed up to 250 kg (550 lb). Features of skull, including a very large beak suited to shearing, have made some researchers consider that the bird may have been carnivorous, but most currently agree that it was a herbivore. The bird's skull is larger than that of small horses.

The species is presumed to have had greatly reduced wing structures, as with other flightless birds the sternum was not keeled. The exceptionally large legs of D. planei enabled it to move its great mass relatively quickly.

==== Habitat ====
A species known from the Bullock Creek fossil fauna in the Northern Territory, the habitat during the time of deposition was a seasonally wet floodplain and river. The flora probably consisted of sedges and shrubs favouring a semi-arid climate. The area was occupied by herbivores favoring shrubland, horned turtles, marsupial tapirs and diprotodontid species, but the fauna associated with this site were rarely the forest dwelling paleospecies of the period. Other mihirungs also occur in the Bullock Creek fauna, species of Ilbandornis. Dromornis planei remains are found with other large contemporaries, such as the diprotodont Neohelos, and the crocodiles Baru that preyed upon them as they came to the water's edge.

The diet of these birds is uncertain, although it is determined that the bill was thin and had little bite force. Gastroliths are found with similar species of other regions, Genyornis, Ilbandornis and near relation Dromornis stirtoni, suggesting a herbivorous diet like the other species it is found alongside, yet suggestions have published that D. planei might have the carnivorous abilities attributed to the terror birds.

=== D. stirtoni ===
Dromornis stirtoni, colloquially known as Stirton's mihirung and Stirton's thunderbird, was a large feathered bird that grew up to heights of 3 m (9.8 ft) and weights in excess of 500 kg and is widely thought to have been the largest avian species to have ever existed. Patricia Vickers-Rich first discovered the remains of the bird in 1979 in the Alcoota Fossil Beds in the Northern Territory of Australia. Large amounts of fragmentary material found at the Alcoota fossil site in Central Australia, the type location, are the only certain occurrence of the bird. Rich proposed the specific epithet for fellow palaeontologist Ruben A. Stirton, an American who undertook extensive research on Australian taxa.

==== Description ====
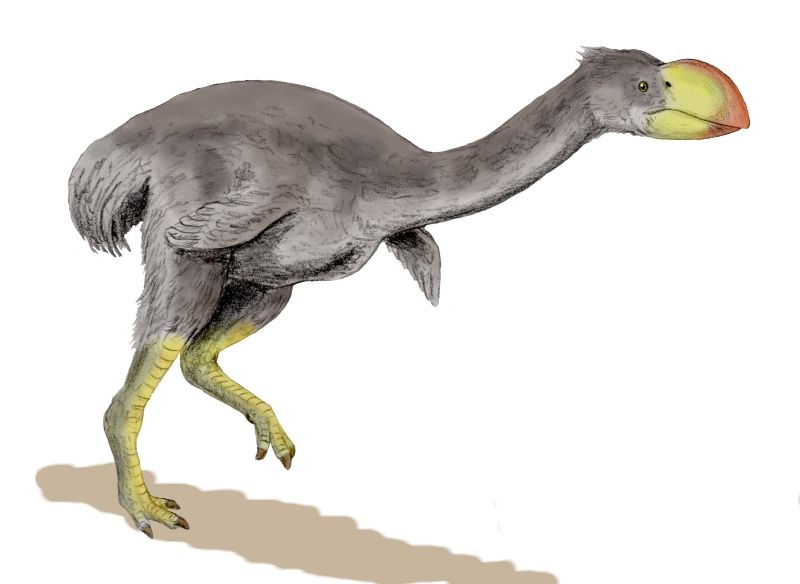
A pencil-drawn reconstruction of Dromornis stirtoni

Dromornis stirtoni was a large feathered bird which grew up over 3 m (9.8 ft) in height. This height is thought to have exceeded the tallest species of the genus Dinornis, which were the giant moas of New Zealand, and the Elephant Birds of Madagascar. This species is from the Dromornithidae family, which is a family of large flightless birds endemic to Australia. The weight of the animal is also thought to have been exceedingly large. Peter F. Murray and Patricia Vickers-Rich, in their work "Magnificent Mihirungs" (2004), utilised three varying scientific methods to derive the approximate weight and size of the D. stirtoni. This thorough analysis of the bones of D. stirtoni revealed that there was considerable sexual dimorphism, and that a fully grown male could weigh between 528 and 584 kg (1,164 and 1,287 lb), whilst a female would likely weigh between 441 and 451 kg (972 and 994 lb). The disparity in robustness was interpreted by the researchers as evidence of the biology of the species, behaviours such as incubation by the female, pair bonding, parental care and aggression while nesting, and courtship or display habits exhibited by extant waterfowl, the anseriforms. In comparison to other known ratite elephant birds of the Aepyornithidae family, this made D. stirtoni the heaviest of all known discoveries. D. stirtoni was compared to Aepyornis maximus by the authors, the largest of that family.

D. stirtoni was characterised by a deep lower jaw and a quadrate bone (which connects the upper and lower jaws) that was distinctly shaped. This narrow, deep bill, made up approximately two thirds of the skull. The front of this powerful jaw was used to cut, whilst the back of the jaw was used for crushing. Comparison of two partial crania with the near complete cranium of Dromornis planei (Bullockornis) shows the head of this species to be about 25% larger. Reconstruction of overlapping remains of the rostrum have revealed its form and size, the lower mandible would have been around 0.5 metres. The size and proportions of the head and its bill are comparable to that of mammals such as camels or horses

The large bird had "stubby", reduced wings, which ultimately deemed it flightless. However, whilst the bird was flightless, a strong development between the bony crests and tuberosities, where the wings were attached, allowed them to flap their wings. The bird was also characterised by its large hind legs, which after the completion of biomechanical studies are confirmed to have been muscular, rather than slender, due to the size of the muscle attachments along the leg. Due to the muscularity of these legs, D. stirtoni is thought to have possibly been capable of running at great speeds, whereas birds such as the emu depend on the slenderness of their legs to reach higher speeds. D. stirtoni was also characterised by its large, hoof-like toes, which had convex nails, rather than claws. Further typical of flightless birds, it did not have a breastbone.

Two forms of unearthed specimens are considered to be due to strong sexual dimorphism, concluded in a 2016 morphometric analysis using landmark based and actual measurements which also supported earlier conclusions regarding the species enormous size. This histological technique has been applied to other large and extinct avian species, including investigation into the paleobiology of the elephant birds Aepyornithidae.

Osteohistological analysis of its femora, tibiotarsi, and tarsometatarsi has also revealed that D. stirtoni was extremely K-selected, likely requiring over a decade to reach its adult body size, after which skeletal maturity occurred and its growth rate retarded.

==== Habitat ====
At present the only recorded fossil discoveries of Dromornis stirtoni have been from the Alcoota Fossil Beds. This region is renowned for the discovery of well-preserved vertebrate fossils from the Miocene epoch (24–5 million years ago). At this location, the fossil deposits are found in the Waite Formation, which consists of sandstones, limestones and siltstones. The various fossils that have been found within this region suggest that they were laid in episodical channels, characterised by a large series of interconnected lakes, within a large basin.

The vegetation type of the region in that period was open woodland favouring its semi-arid climate, within which seasonal rainfall occurs. D. stirtoni is found amongst the depositions of the Alcoota and Ongeva Local Faunas, dated to the Late Miocene and early Pliocene. Fragmentary remains are common at these sites, although little is assignable to an individual of the species. Some depositions contain fragments of around four individuals in disarray over an area of one square metre. Other dromornithid species have been found alongside this species, Ilbandornis woodburnei and the tentatively placed Ilbandornis lawsoni, resembling the large but more gracile modern birds such as ostriches and emus.

The concentration of dromornithid species, and more generally, other fossils within this area is indicative of the phenomenon known as "waterhole-tethering", whereby animals would accumulate within the immediate area of water sources, many of which would then die. Whilst this is the only location that D. stirtoni have been discovered, discovery of other species within the Dromornithidae family suggests that they may have been distributed across Australia. Various Dromornithidae fossils have been found in Riversleigh (Queensland) and Bullocks Creek (Northern Territory), as well as tracks in Pioneer (Tasmania).

D. stirtoni probably existed in an assemblage of fauna that included other dromornithids and browsing marsupials as the apex herbivores. The Alcoota Local Fauna were deposited at the only known upper Miocene fossil beds of Central Australia. The early conceptions of a fearsome bird receives some support from the proposed behaviour of the larger males aggressively defending a preferred range against competitors, other males or herbivores, and predators.

==== Feeding and diet ====
It is widely accepted that Dromornis stirtoni was herbivorous. This has been deduced from various features of its anatomy. One of these features is that the end of the bird's bill, does not have a hook, and that the beak is instead wide, narrow and blunt, typical of a herbivore. The bird also had hoof-like feet, rather than 'talons', which are typically associated with carnivores or omnivores. Lastly, analysis of the amino acids within the egg shells of D. stirtoni suggest that the species was herbivorous. Despite this however, there are various indicators that suggest the bird may have been carnivorous or omnivorous (Murray, 2004). The size and muscularity of the birds skull and beak would also suggest that they may not have been herbivores, as no source of vegetable food in their environment would have required such a powerful beak (Vickers-Rich, 1979). In recognition of the varying opinions, it is widely accepted that whilst the large bird may have occasionally scavenged or eaten smaller prey, they were mostly herbivorous.

== Extinction ==
It is proposed that various factors may have contributed to the extinction of Dromornis stirtoni. Palaeontologists Murray and Vickers-Rich suggested that the diet may have overlapped considerably with the diets of other large birds and animals, and that the subsequent converging trophic morphology could have contributed to the large birds extinction as it was 'out-competed' of its food source. Alternative arguments have proposed that the large birds' breeding patterns may have contributed. It's suggested that D. stirtoni lived for a relatively long period of time in a group of older birds; however, for the few young that were produced, time to maturity was considerable. Subsequently, breeding adults were replaced slowly, which left the species highly vulnerable if breeding adults were lost.
