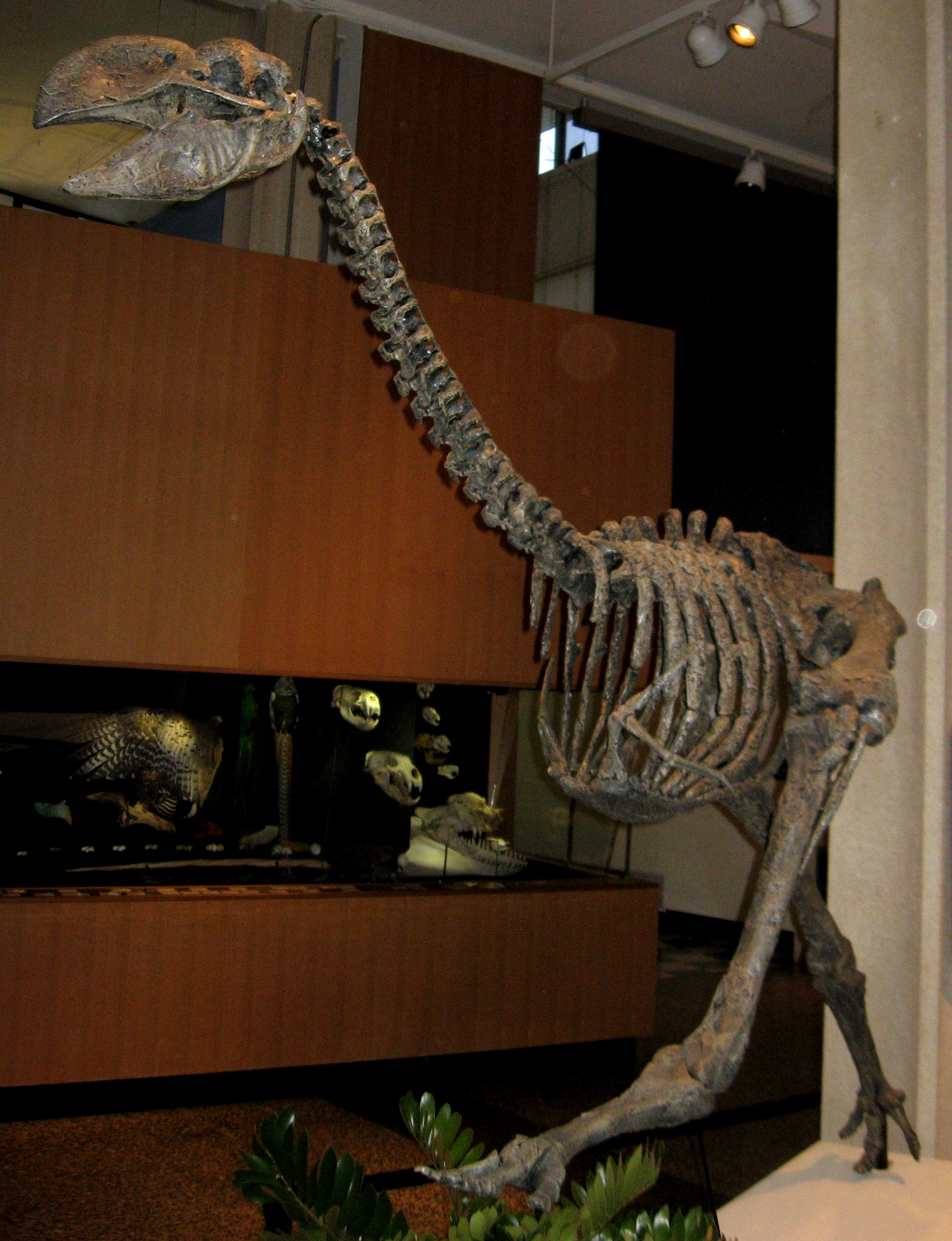
- Dromornis stirtoni

Scientific classification
- Kingdom: Animalia
- Phylum: Chordata
- Class: Aves
- Clade: Pangalloanserae
- Superorder: Galloanserae
- Family: †Dromornithidae; Fürbringer, 1888

Genera
- †Barawertornis; †Dromornis (type); †Genyornis; †Ilbandornis

= Dromornithidae =

Dromornithids Temporal range: Oligocene - Pleistocene, 25–0.03 Ma Possible Eocene record

Extinct family of birds

Dromornithidae, known as mihirungs (after Tjapwuring Mihirung paringmal, "giant bird") and informally as thunder birds or demon ducks, is an extinct family of large, flightless birds native to Australia from at least the late Oligocene (and perhaps as early as the early Eocene) to the Late Pleistocene. They were long classified in Struthioniformes (the ratites), but are now usually classified as a type of gigantic fowl (Galloanserae). Dromornithids were part of the Australian megafauna. One species, Dromornis stirtoni, was 3 m (9 ft 10 in) tall, making them among the largest birds ever. Only a single species, Genyornis newtoni survived into the Late Pleistocene. They are thought to have been herbivorous.

== Classification ==
The scientific name Dromornithidae derives from the Greek words δρομαίος, dromaios ("swift-running") and ὀρνις, ornis ("bird"). The family was named by Max Fürbringer in 1888, citing W. B. Clarke and Gerard Krefft, Owen's separation from "Dromaeus" and Dinornis, and a note by von Haast allying Dromornis with Dromaeus. What the nearest relatives of this group are is a controversial issue. For many years it was thought that dromornithids were related to ratites, such as emus, cassowaries, rheas and ostriches. It is now believed that the similarities between these groups are the result of similar responses to the loss of flight. The latest idea on dromornithid relationships, based on details of the skull, is that they evolved early in the lineage that includes waterfowl (Anseriformes). However, some phylogenetic studies have recovered them as closer to gamefowl (Galliformes).

Below is the general consensus of the phylogeny under the hypothesis that they are members of Anserimorphae.

- Odontoanserae
  - †Pelagornithidae (pseudo-tooth birds)
  - Anserimorphae
    - †Gastornithidae
    - - †Dromornithidae (mihirungs)
      - - †Vegaviidae
        - Anseriformes (waterfowl)

A 2017 paper concerning the evolution and phylogeny of the giant fowl by Worthy and colleagues have found phylogenetic support in finding the mihirungs to be the sister taxon to Gastornithidae. Worthy et al. (2017) incorporated several new taxa and character traits into existing matrices of Galloanserae resulted in several of their phylogenies to support this grouping. The authors did note the bootstrap support is weakly supported and one of their phylogenies even found gastornithiforms to be stem galliforms instead. These were also weakly supported. Below is a simplified phylogeny showing their one phylogeny supporting gastornithiforms as anserimorphs.

- Anserimorphae
  - Anseriformes (screamers and waterfowl)
  - - †Vegaviiformes
    - Gastornithiformes
      - †Gastornithidae
      - †Dromornithidae (mihirungs)

A 2021 study conversely found their internal cranial anatomy more similar to that of galliforms than to anseriforms.

A 2022 study concerning their proteins found them to be sister group to the common group of galliforms and anseriforms.

Two years later, Mclnerney, Blokland and Worthy redescribed the skull morphology and phylogenetic affinity of the dromornithid Genyornis newtoni, finding Dromornithidae as members of Anseriformes, closely related to screamers from South America.

- Anseriformes
  - - Anhimae
      - †Dromornithidae (mihirungs)
      - Anhimidae (screamers)
    - - †Conflicto
      - Anseres
        - †Presbyornithidae
        - - Anseranatidae
          - Anatidae

=== Species ===
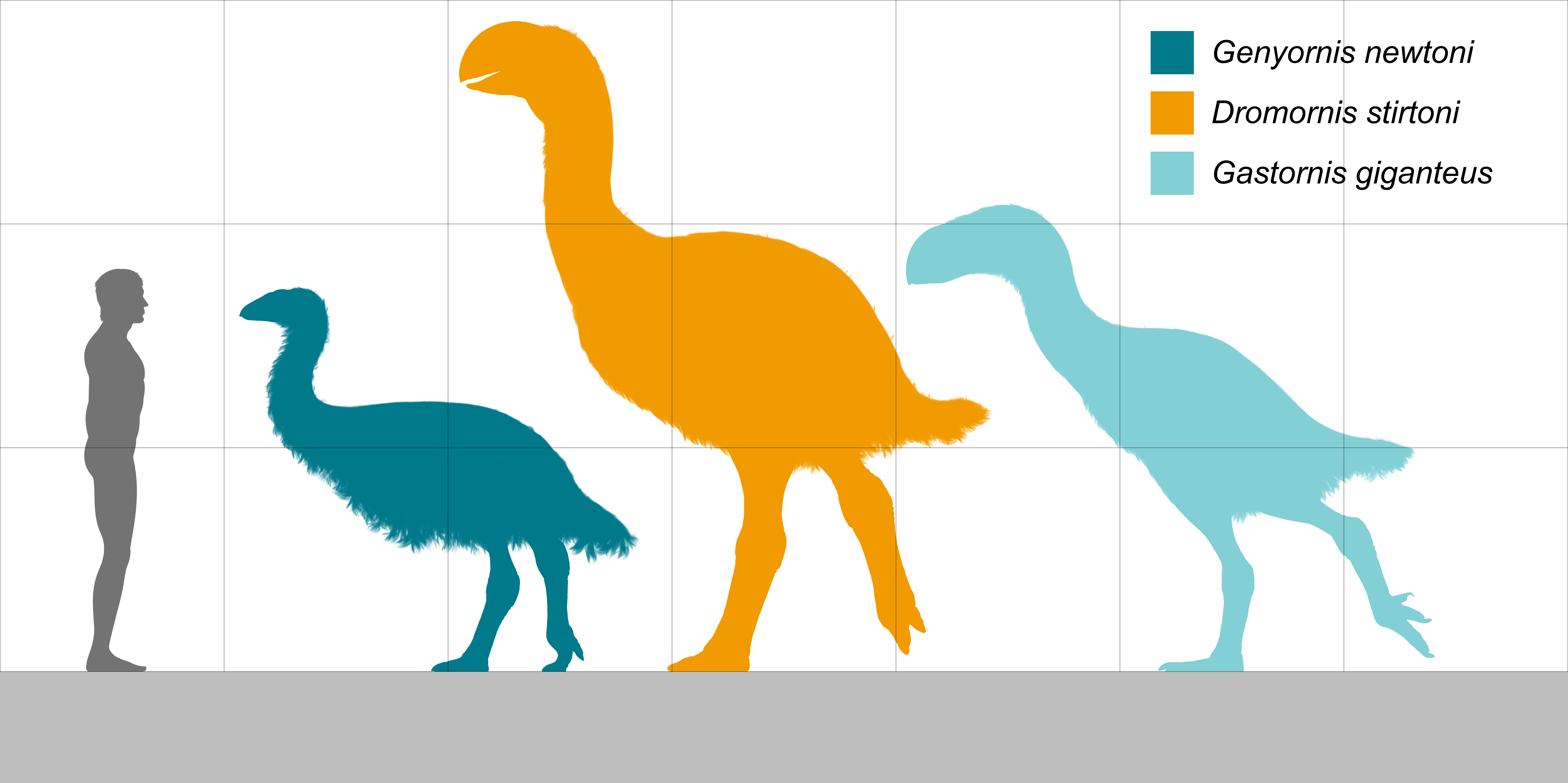
Size comparison of the dromornithids Dromornis stirtoni (orange) and Genyornis newtoni (dark blue), along with the possible relative Gastornis (light blue) known from the Paleogene of the Northern Hemisphere

The number of taxa in the Dromornithidae family was recognised as eight species in four genera by 2021, the smallest species was Barawertornis tedfordi, a bird about the size of a modern cassowary, weighing 80 to 95 kg (176 to 209 lb). The two species of Ilbandornis (Ilbandornis lawsoni and Ilbandornis woodburnei) were larger birds, but had more slender legs than the other dromornithids and were similar to ostriches in their build and size. Dromornis planei (the "demon duck of doom") and Genyornis newtoni (the "mihirung") were more heavily built, stood about 2 to 2.5 m (6.6 to 8.2 ft) tall and probably reached weights of 220 to 240 kg (490 to 530 lb). The largest dromornithids were Dromornis australis, from which the family gets its name, and the massive Dromornis stirtoni ("Stirton's thunderbird"). Genyornis is the best known of the genera.

The classification of these species has been based upon distinguishing characters of the femur, all type specimens are femurs. The cranial remains occur less frequently, with three assignable to a species level.

The placement of these dromornithid species may be summarised as:

Dromornithidae (8 species in 4 genera)

- Dromornis Owen, 1872

- Dromornis australis Owen, 1872
- Dromornis murrayi Worthy et al., 2016
- Dromornis planei (Rich, 1979)
- Dromornis stirtoni Rich, 1979

- Barawertornis Rich, 1979

- Barawertornis tedfordi Rich, 1979

- Ilbandornis Rich, 1979

- Ilbandornis woodburnei Rich, 1979
- Ilbandornis lawsoni Rich, 1979

- Genyornis Stirling & Zietz, 1896

- Genyornis newtoni Stirling & Zietz, 1896

Cladogram of Dromornithidae after McInerney et al. 2024

- Dromornithidae
  - Dromornis
    - Dromornis planei
    - - Dromornis murrayi
      - Dromornis stirtoni
  - - Genyornis newtoni
    - Ilbandornis
      - Ilbandornis woodburnei
      - Ilbandornis lawsoni

== Discovery ==
The most recent species, Genyornis newtoni, was certainly known to Aboriginal Australians during the Late Pleistocene. Cave paintings thought to depict this bird are known, as are carved footprints larger than those considered to represent emus. At Cuddie Springs, Genyornis bones have been excavated in association with human artifacts. The issue of how much of an impact humans had on dromornithids and other large animals of the time is unresolved and much debated. Many scientists believe that human settlement and hunting were largely responsible for the extinction of dromornithids, as well as many other species of the Australian megafauna.

The first Europeans to encounter the bones of dromornithids may have been Thomas Mitchell and his team. While exploring the Wellington Caves, one of his men tied his rope to a projecting object which broke when he tried to descend the rope. After the man had climbed back up, it was found that the projecting object was the fossilised long bone of a large bird. The first species to be described was Dromornis australis. The specimen was found in a 55-metre deep well at Peak Downs, Queensland, and subsequently described by Richard Owen in 1872.

Extensive collections of dromornithid fossils were first made at Lake Callabonna, South Australia.

In 1892, E. C. Stirling and A. H. C. Zietz of the South Australian Museum received reports of large bones in a dry lake bed in the northwest of the state. Over the several next years, they made several trips to the site, collecting nearly complete skeletons of several individuals. They named the newly found species Genyornis newtoni in 1896. Additional remains of Genyornis have been found in other parts of South Australia and in New South Wales and Victoria.

Other sites of importance were Bullock Creek and Alcoota, both in the Northern Territory. The specimen recovered there remained unstudied and unnamed until 1979, when Patricia Rich described five new species and four new genera.

The best represented bones of dromornithids are vertebrae, long bones of the hindlimb and toe bones. Ribs and wing bones are uncommonly preserved. The rarest part of the skeleton is the skull. For many years, the only skull known was a damaged specimen of Genyornis. Early reconstructions of dromornithids made them appear like oversized emus. Peter Murray and Dirk Megirian of Australia's Northern Territory Museum recovered enough skull material of Bullockornis to give a good idea of what that bird's head looked like. It is now known that the Bullockornis skull was very large, with the enormous bill making up about two-thirds of it. The bill was deep, but rather narrow. The jaws had cutting edges at the front, as well as crushing surfaces at the back. There were attachments for large muscles, indicating that Bullockornis had a powerful bite. More fragmentary remains of the skull of Dromornis suggest that it, too, had an oversized skull.

Bones are not the only remains of dromornithids that have been found:

- The polished stones that the birds kept in their gizzards (muscular stomachs) occur at a number of sites. These stones, called gastroliths, played an important role in their digestion by breaking up coarse food or matter that was swallowed in large chunks.
- Series of footprints, called trackways, have been found at several sites.
- Impressions of the inside of the skull cavity (endocranial casts or endocasts) have been found. Endocasts are formed when sediments fill the empty skull, after which the skull is destroyed. These fossils give a fairly accurate picture of dromornithid brains.

== Description ==
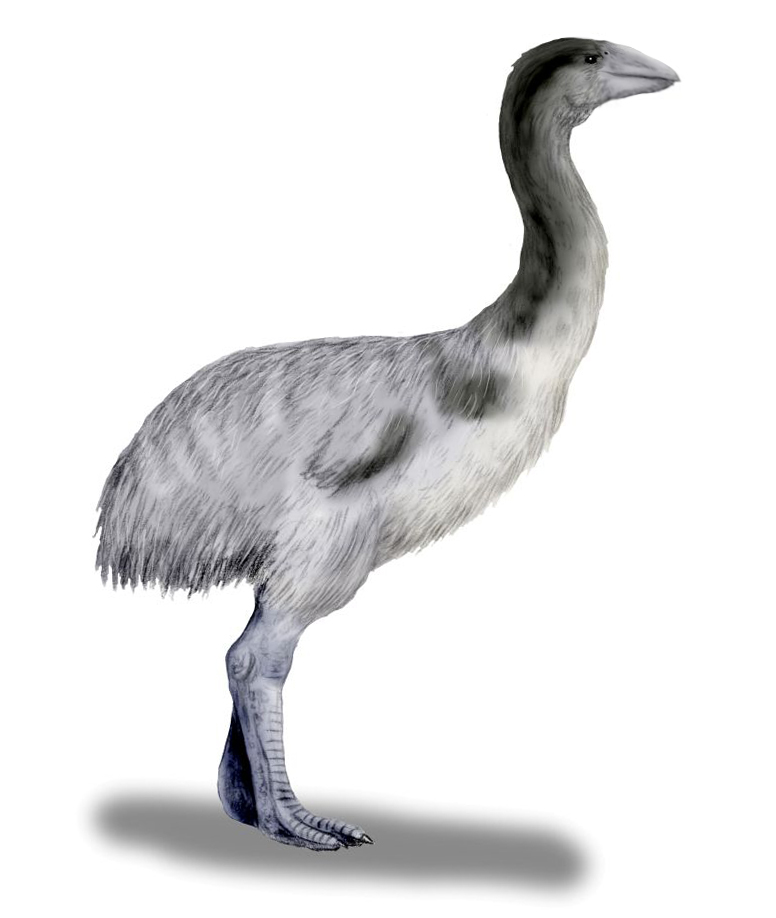
Artist's reconstruction of Genyornis newtoni.

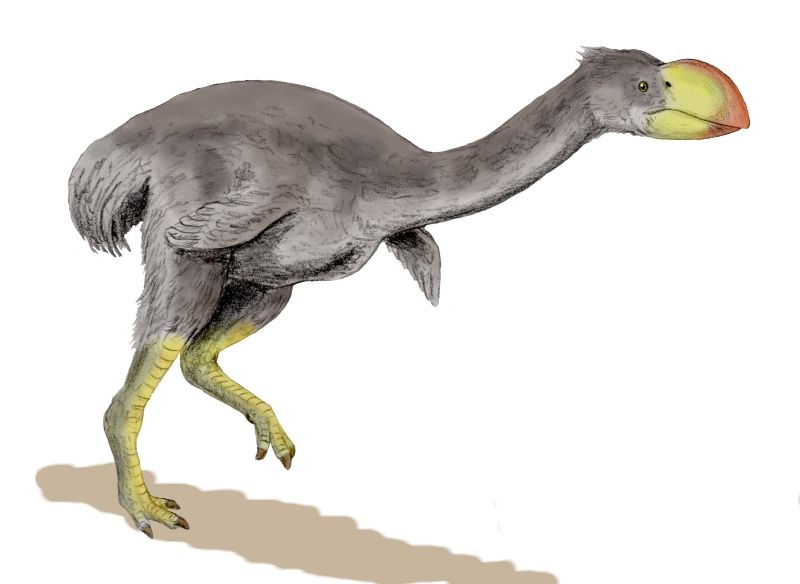
Artist's reconstruction of Dromornis stirtoni.

Dromornithids looked superficially like very large emus or moa. Most were heavy-bodied, with powerfully developed legs and greatly reduced wings. The last bones of the toes resembled small hooves, rather than claws as in most birds. Like emus and other flightless birds, dromornithids lost the keel on the breastbone (or sternum) that serves as the attachment for the large flight muscles in most bird skeletons. Their skull also was quite different from that of emus. These birds ranged from about the size of a modern cassowary 1.5 to 1.8 m (4 ft 11 in to 5 ft 11 in) up to 3 m (9 ft 10 in) in the case of Dromornis stirtoni, possibly the largest bird that ever lived after the elephant bird (Vorombe).

=== Locomotion ===
Because of their enormous size, dromornithids have been considered to have been slow, lumbering creatures. Their legs are not long and slender like those of emus or ostriches, which are specialised for running. However, biomechanical analysis of the attachments and presumed sizes of the muscles suggest that dromornithids might have been able to run much faster than originally thought, making up for their less than ideal form with brute strength.

=== Sexual dimorphism ===
Rich deposits of Dromornis stirtoni specimens, containing two forms has been determined to be evidence of sexual dimorphism within that species, the largest known. Males were more robust and heavier than females, although not necessarily taller.

=== Endocast studies ===
A 2021 study found that dromornithids had an internal cranial anatomy similar to that of galliforms.

== Diet ==
It has been generally thought that the dromornithids were plant eaters, a belief currently considered common scientific consensus. This belief is based on:

- the lack of a hook at the end of the bill
- the lack of talons on the toes
- the association of gizzard stones (caveat: gastroliths are also found in the stomachs of some carnivores, such as modern crocodiles)
- the large number of individuals occurring together, suggesting flocking behaviour

Functional interpretations by researchers Warren Handley and Trevor Worthy suggests that dromornithids were specialised herbivores that likely possessed well-developed stereoscopic depth perception, were diurnal and fed on soft browse such as new growth, soft leaves, and fruit. Musculature for operation of the bill is "surprisingly limited", suggesting that these birds were not capable of a particularly forceful bite. There is no temporal fossa on the side of the cranium for insertion of mandibular musculature. The culmen in Dromornis, while large, has a lightly constructed osseous core that was only partially covered in rhamphotheca, was highly vascularised and likely highly innervated, a combination of features conferring relatively weak biting ability. This suggests that dromornithids were likely not consuming coarse browse requiring strong bite forces.

It has been suggested that, despite the indications of herbivory in some dromornithids, Bullockornis may have been a carnivore or possibly a scavenger. However, most authorities now consider it to be a herbivore.

A study on the skull of Genyornis suggests they might have fed on aquatic plants.

== Distribution ==
Records of these birds are known only from Australia. Most of the records of dromornithids come from the eastern half of the continent, although fossil evidence has also been discovered in Tasmania and Western Australia. At some Northern Territory sites they are very common, sometimes comprising 60–70% of the fossil material.

The earliest bones identified were found in Late Oligocene deposits at Riversleigh in northwestern Queensland. There are foot impressions from the Early Eocene in southeastern Queensland (Redbank Plains Formation) that may be referable to dromornithids. The most recent evidence, of Genyornis newtoni, has been found at Cuddie Springs in north-central New South Wales and dated at 31,000 years old.

== Extinction ==
The reasons for the extinction of this entire family along with the rest of the Australian megafauna by the end of the Pleistocene are still debated. It is hypothesized that the arrival of the first humans in Australia (around 48–60 thousand years ago) and their hunting and landscape-changing use of fire may have contributed to the disappearance of the megafauna. However, drought conditions during peak glaciation (about 18,000 years ago) are a significantly confounding factor. Some studies appear to rule this out as the primary cause of extinction, but there has also been some dispute about these studies. It is likely that a combination of all of these factors contributed to the megafauna's demise. However, there is significant disagreement about the relative importance of each.

== See also ==
- Fossil birds
- Later Quaternary prehistoric birds
