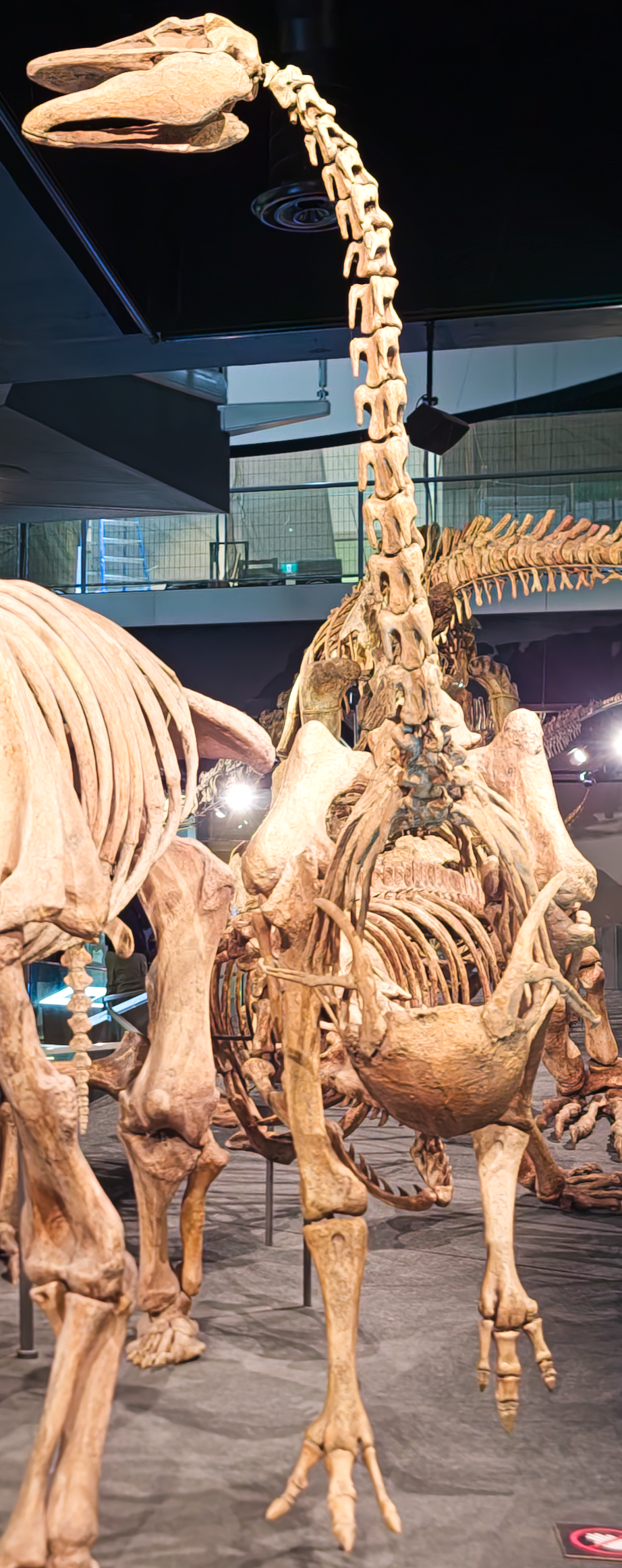
- Reconstructed skeleton of Genyornis in front-on view

Scientific classification
- Kingdom: Animalia
- Phylum: Chordata
- Class: Aves
- Superorder: Galloanserae
- Family: †Dromornithidae
- Genus: †Genyornis; Stirling & Zietz, 1896
- Species: †G. newtoni

Binomial name
- †Genyornis newtoni Stirling & Zietz, 1896

= Genyornis =

Genyornis Temporal range: Late Pleistocene

Extinct genus of large flightless birds

Genyornis is an extinct genus of large, flightless bird that lived in Australia during the Pleistocene Epoch until around 40-50,000 years ago. Over two metres in height, they were likely herbivorous. It is the last known member of the extinct flightless bird family Dromornithidae, which had been part of the fauna of the Australian continent for over 30 million years. They are not closely related to ratites such as emus, and are instead thought to be a gigantic type of fowl, likely an early diverging group within the Anseriformes, which contains ducks and geese. Genyornis and many other Australian megafauna became extinct in Australia as part of the Late Pleistocene extinction event, coinciding with the arrival of humans. Evidence has been found for human consumption of Genyornis eggs, making it one of the few species of Australian megafauna for which evidence of human interaction is known.

== Taxonomy and evolution ==
=== History of discovery ===
The species Genyornis newtoni was first described in 1896 by Edward Charles Stirling and A. H. C. Zeitz, the authors giving the epithet newtoni for the Cambridge professor Alfred Newton.

The name of the genus is derived from the ancient Greek γένυς (génus) 'jaw; chin' and ὄρνις (órnis) 'bird', because of the relatively large size of the lower mandible. The specimen is a left femur. It was found at Lake Callabonna in South Australia. The excavation was undertaken and described by Zietz. A description of the excavation was reported in Nature which had also unearthed material recognised as marsupials.

Numerous fragments of avian fossils were noticed in the clay surrounding the removal of diprotodont fossils, then largely complete specimens including crucial evidence of the crania emerged from the site. The paper reviewed previously described fossil remains of "struthious [ostrich-like] birds in Australia", which had either been assigned to the ancient emus of Dromaius or the only described species of Dromornis, D. australis Owen.

A letter from George Hurst concerning the discovery of a partial skeleton of the species alerted Stirling to its existence in 1893.

=== Evolution ===
The family to which Genyornis belongs, Dromornithidae, are generally considered to be a kind of gigantic fowl, though their placement in the group has been controversial. A 2024 study suggested that they belonged to the Anseriformes, the clade which contains ducks and geese among others, and were most closely related to the South American screamers (Anhimidae).

Cladogram of Dromornithidae after McInerney et al. 2024

- Dromornithidae
  - Dromornis
    - Dromornis planei
    - - Dromornis murrayi
      - Dromornis stirtoni
  - - Genyornis newtoni
    - Ilbandornis
      - Ilbandornis woodburnei
      - Ilbandornis lawsoni

The earliest possible record of the group is footprints of a large probably flightless bird with a similar foot anatomy to Genyornis known from the Paleocene-Eocene aged Redbank Plains Formation in Queensland, likely over 55 million years old. The earliest skeletal remains of dromornithids are not known until much later around the late Oligocene, at least 25 million years ago. The family was diverse during the Miocene epoch with several co-existing lineages of dromornithid, including Dromornis, some species of which are among the largest birds ever. However the family subsequently declined, and Genyornis newtoni was the only living species of dromornithid by the Late Pleistocene.

== Description ==
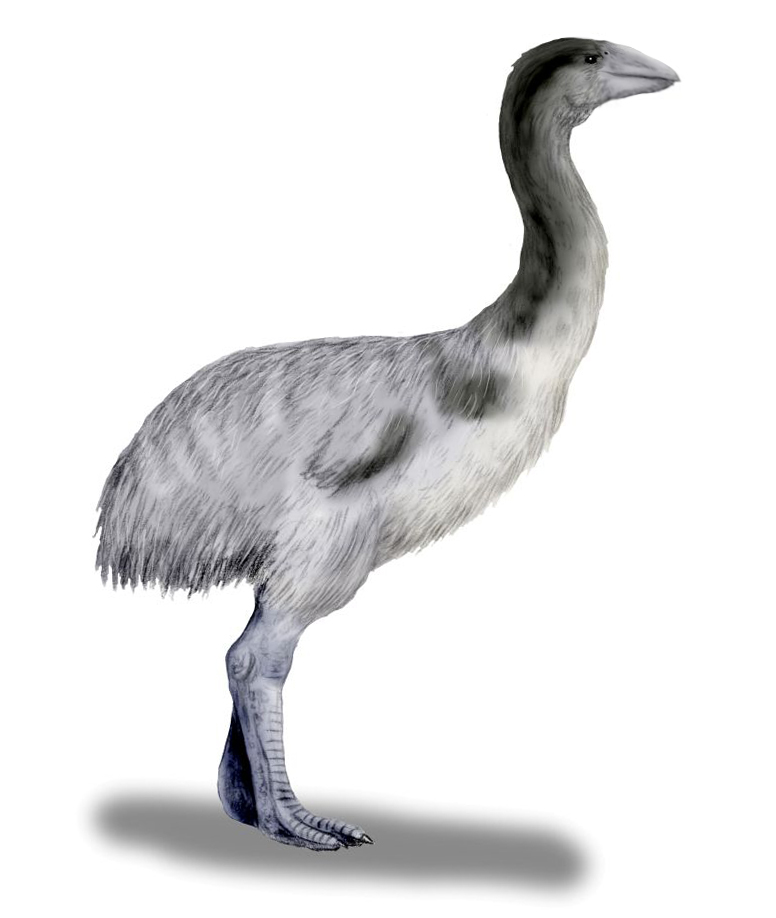
Life restoration

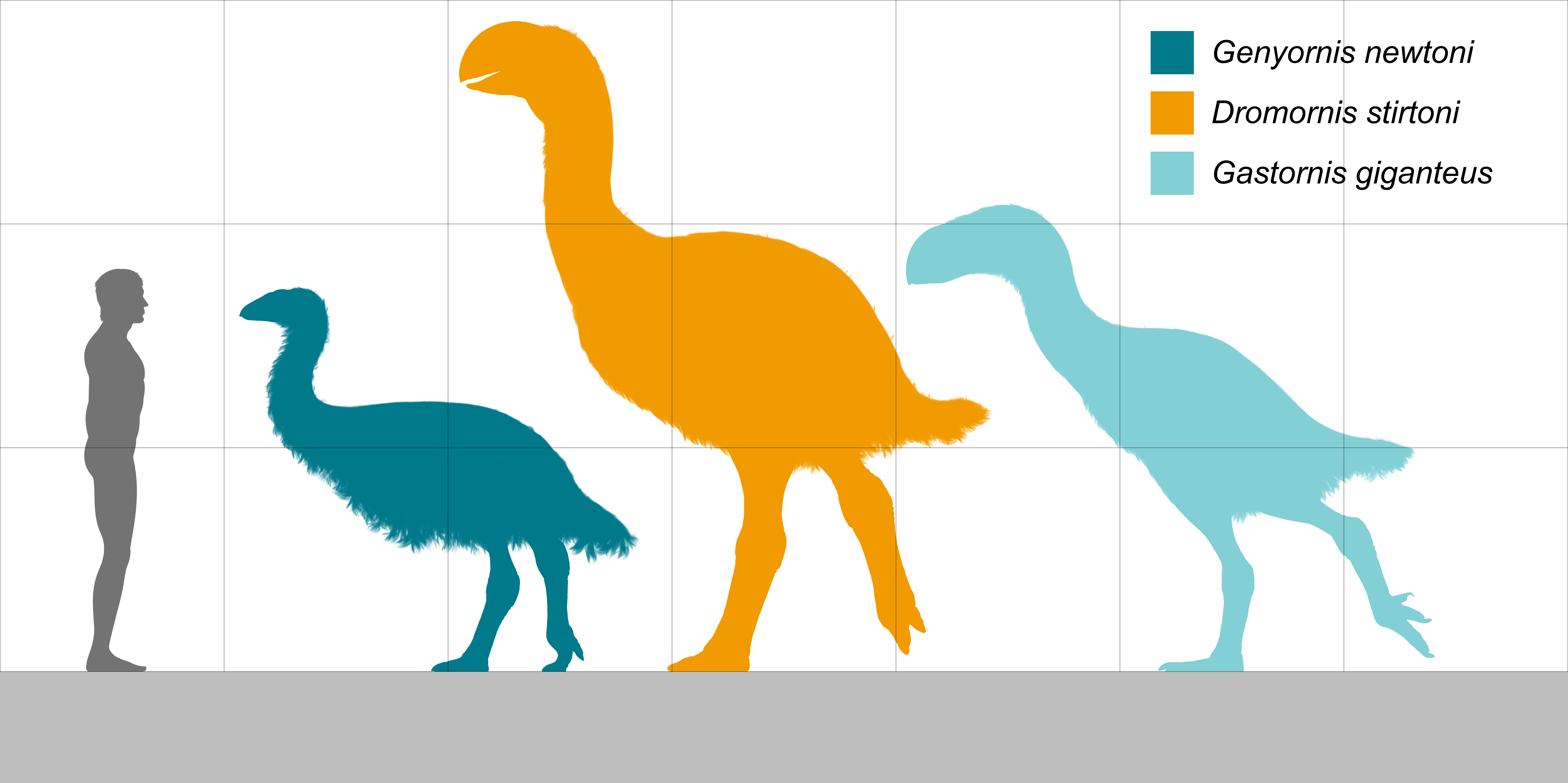
Size of Genyornis (dark blue, left), compared to the largest dromornithid Dromornis stirtoni (centre, orange) and Gastornis (light blue, right), a possible relative of dromornithids known from the Paleogene of the Northern Hemisphere

Genyornis newtoni was a medium-sized dromornithid with a robust body, measuring 2–2.5 m (6 ft 7 in – 8 ft 2 in) tall and weighing around 250–350 kg (550–770 lb), though body mass estimation may vary based on different methods. While larger than Ilbandornis, it did not attain the height and weight of Dromornis stirtoni or Dromornis planei. The fossils of the species have been found remaining in articulation, and no other dromornithid species has been discovered in this state. The remains of eggs have also been attributed to this species, being on average 15.5 cm (6.1 in) in length and 12.5 cm (4.9 in) in width. Gastroliths belonging to these animals have been found alongside their remains, a feature that has revealed the sometimes shallow site of fossils.

Prior to 2024, reconstructions of the skull of Genyornis were primarily based on those of its closest relatives, due to the heavily damaged nature of the holotype. However, a 2024 study on the skull morphology of Genyornis, incorporating a recently discovered well-preserved skull, found the physical appearance of the head of Genyornis to be much more different than previously believed. Namely, the bill was found to be much more goose-like, with a raised triangular casque. This goose-like bill differed from even other mihirungs, and may have been a specialization for feeding on aquatic vegetation. Other potential adaptations to an aquatic feeding style may have allowed for protection of the ears and throat when submerging their heads in water.

== Distribution ==
This mihirung has been found at sites in South Australia and New South Wales, dating to the Pleistocene Epoch. Genyornis newtoni is the only species of dromornithid known to have existed during the Pleistocene.

== Extinction ==
Two main theories propose a cause for megafauna extinction - human impact and changing climate. A study has been performed in which more than 700 Genyornis eggshell fragments were dated. Through this, it was determined that Genyornis declined and became extinct over a short period—too short for it to be plausibly explained by climate variability. The authors considered this to be a very good indication that the entire mass extinction event in Australia was due to human activity, rather than climate change.

A 2015 study collected egg shell fragments of Genyornis from around 200 sites that show burn marks. Analysis of amino acids in the egg shells showed a thermal gradient consistent with the egg being placed on an ember fire. The egg shells were dated to between 53.9 and 43.4 thousand years BP, suggesting that humans were collecting and cooking Genyornis eggs in the thousands of years before their extinction. A later study suggested that the eggs actually belonged to the giant malleefowl, a species of extinct megapode.

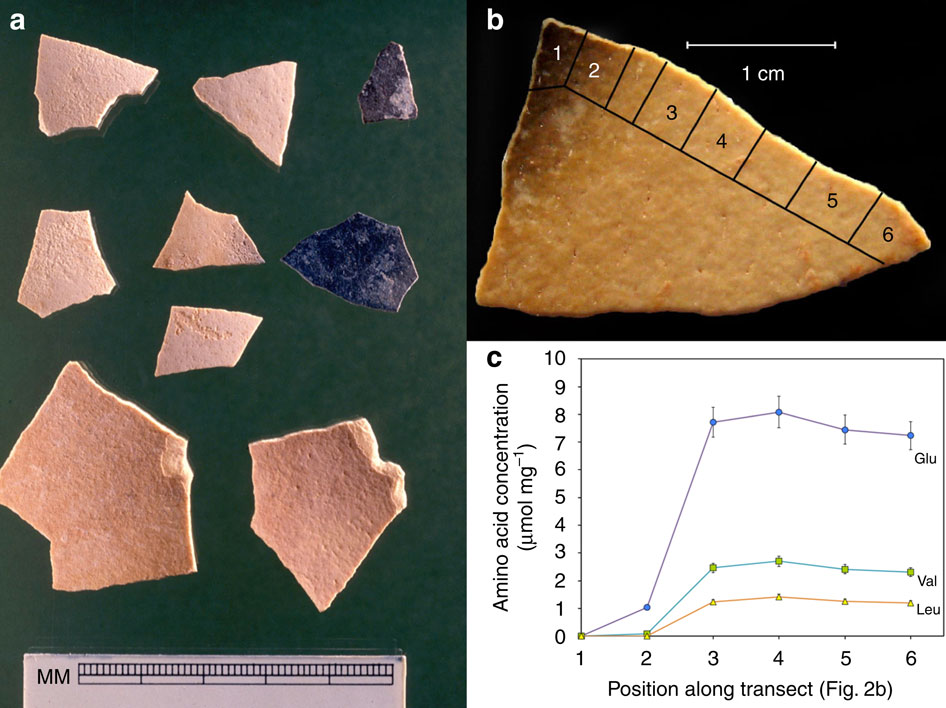
Blackened egg shells

A 2022 study examined the protein sequences of these unidentified eggshells and, through phylogenetic analysis, concluded that the lineage that produced these eggs diverged prior to the emergence of megapodes, supporting the previous implication that the eggs in question were produced by Genyornis. The authors noted that the exploitation of Genyornis eggs appears to mirror that of earlier human usage of ostrich eggs throughout the Pleistocene in Northern Africa, the Arabian Peninsula, Southwestern and Northern Asia, and present-day India and China, though they were unable to determine to what extent humans interacted with Genyornis.

A 2021 study found that, if Genyornis eggs were being consumed at similar rates to the eggs of the emu and the Australian brushturkey, then Genyornis would have become extinct at far lower rates of total consumption than these still-extant birds.

In May 2010, archaeologists announced the rediscovery of an Aboriginal rock art painting, possibly 40,000 years old, at the Nawarla Gabarnmung rock art site in the Northern Territory, that they suggested depicts two Genyornis individuals. In 2011, late survival of Genyornis in temperate southwest Victoria was suggested, based on Aboriginal traditions. A later study suggested that the painting could not be more than 14,000 years old, long after the bird is thought to have gone extinct, and it could not be morphologically distinguished from depictions of other birds.

In a 2022 study, fossil evidence suggests that the population of Genyornis at Lake Callabonna died around 50,000 years ago, as the lake dried up as the climate changed and became drier. The birds recovered from the site seemed to have been particularly prone to osteomyelitis, as a result of getting stuck in the mud of the drying lake bed as the water receded. Eventually, when the lake dried, the population was left without their main source of water and subsequently died out.

A 2024 study of the skull morphology of Genyornis found apparent adaptations to feeding on aquatic plants, making them closely tied to freshwater habitats. A reliance on these habitats may have made the species uniquely vulnerable to the loss of freshwater lakes during the aridification of Australia during the late Pleistocene, potentially leading to its extinction.
