= Alcoota =

Paleontological site in the Northern Territory

Alcoota Fossil Beds
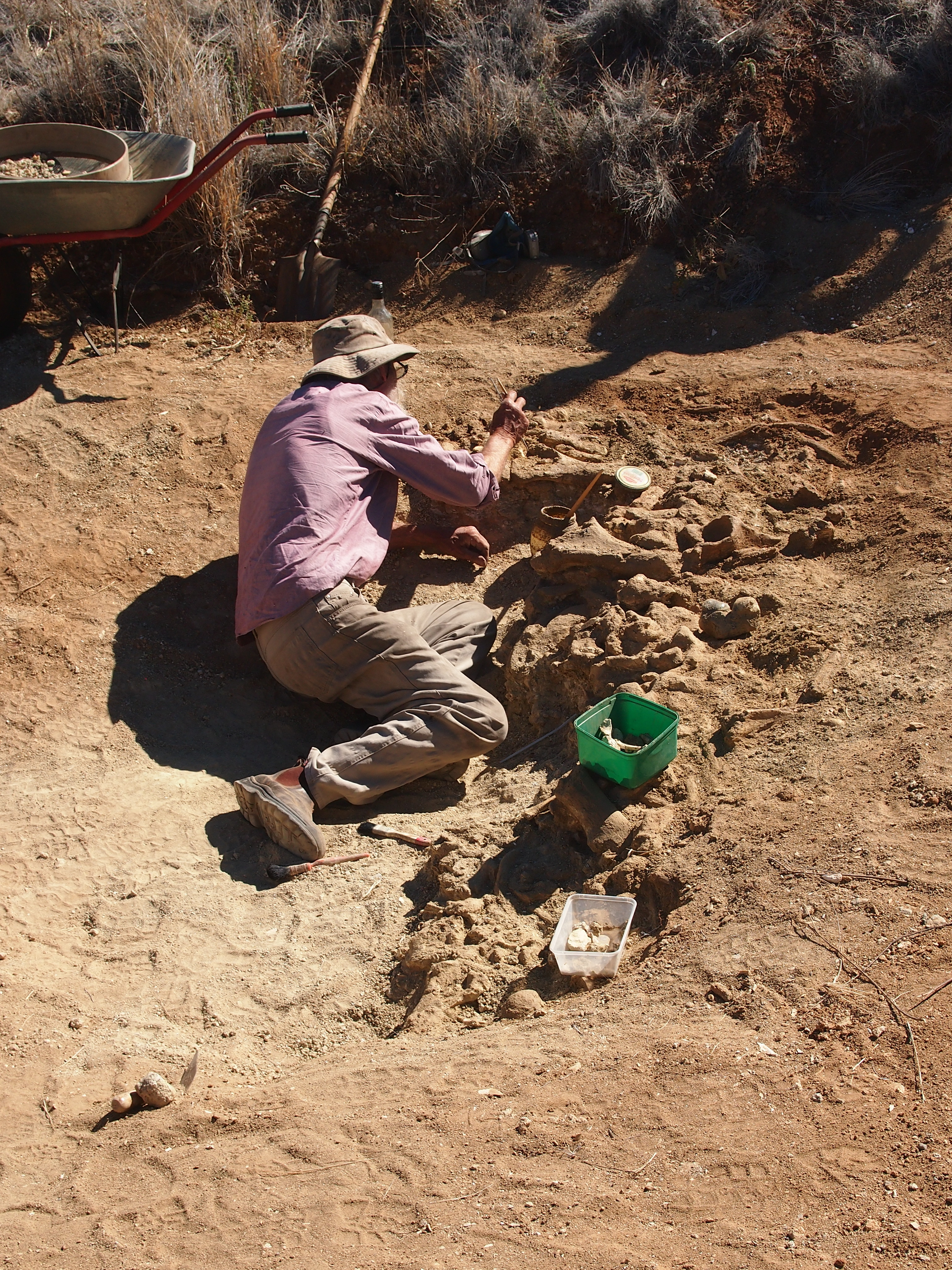
- Latz's pit, Alcoota fossil site, NT
- Interactive map of Alcoota Fossil Beds
- 22°51′39.6″S 134°25′5.9″E
- Location: Anmatjere, Northern Territory, Australia

Site notes
- Area: 48.88 hectares (120.8 acres)

The Alcoota Fossil Beds are an important paleontological Lagerstätte in the Northern Territory of Australia located on Alcoota Station in the locality of Anmatjere about 115 kilometres (71 mi) north-east of Alice Springs in the Central Australia region. It is notable for the occurrence of well-preserved, rare, Miocene vertebrate fossils, which provide evidence of the evolution of the Northern Territory’s fauna and climate. The Alcoota Fossil Beds are also significant as a research and teaching site for palaeontology students.

The Alcoota deposit is a series of intermittently interconnected lakes within a large basin. Evidence suggests that the concentration of fossils is due to a phenomenon called ‘waterhole-tethering’: During dry periods, animals concentrated in the immediate area of the continually shrinking, spring-fed lake, resulting in the death of many animals. The Alcoota and Bullock Creek fossil faunas provide evidence that aridification was in progress in northern Australia during the mid-Miocene geological time period.

== History ==
The Alcoota Fossil Beds are one of only three known vertebrate fossil sites in the Northern Territory, along with Bullock Creek and the Kangaroo Well site. Although locals had known about the existence of fossils at Alcoota for a long time, the first serious studies were not conducted until 1962. Further excavations were conducted sporadically until 1984 when the Museum and Art Gallery of the Northern Territory commenced an annual excavation program. In 1988, a permanent field station was erected on-site and the valuable Alcoota Beds were fenced to provide them with some protection.

The Alcoota fauna is about 8 million years old and has a rich concentration of vertebrate fossils. This makes it especially interesting, as it lies between the older faunas of Kutjamarpu (Southern Australia) and Bullock Creek (Northern Territory) and the younger deposits of Riversleigh (Queensland) and Beaumaris (Victoria). Because of its intermediate age, remote ancestors of the well-studied Australian megafauna as well as of some existing forms can be recognised.

== Fossils ==
Two sites are associated with the area, the species found at these are described as the Alcoota Local Fauna and late Miocene Ongeva Local Fauna. Ongeva is stratigraphically younger, as it sits atop the Alcoota sediments. The Alcoota fossil deposit consists of a series of bone-bearing lenses on a single horizon. The individual lenses are about 1 m across and extend for 170 m. Bones and teeth are so abundant and often tightly packed, excavating one fossil without breaking the one below it can be difficult. The fossils indicate the existence of a complex community of marsupials, birds, and crocodiles, including the greatest variety of species of Diprotodontidae that has ever been described.

The species found include one of the largest birds that ever lived, Stirton's thunderbird (Dromornis stirtoni), the giant birds Ilbandornis lawsoni and Ilbandornis woodburnei, the wolf-sized powerful thylacine (Thylacinus potens), and the large leopard-sized Alcoota marsupial lion (Wakaleo alcootaensis). Also found at Alcoota are fossils of herds of the wombat-like diprotodontoids Kolopsis torus and Plaisiodon centralis, the trunked Palorchestes painei, Pyramios alcootense and kangaroos, crocodiles, bandicoots, possums, and small birds. The two earliest-known macropodine kangaroos, Dorcopsoides fossilis and Dorcopsoides cowpatensis, come from Alcoota LF and Ongeva LF, respectively.

== Heritage listing ==
In 1995, land described as "Northern Territory Portion 4075" and covering an area of 48.88 hectares (120.8 acres) was added under the name "Alcoota Fossil Beds" to the Northern Territory Heritage Register.

== See also ==
- List of fossil sites (with link directory)
