= Duinefontein =

Archaeological sites in South Africa

Duinefontein 1 and 2 are early prehistoric archaeological sites near Cape Town in South Africa

== Discoveries ==
The sites have yielded Acheulean stone tools and animal bones dating between 200,000 and 400,000 years ago. The site was not settled, but instead seems to have been a waterside location where hominids could hunt animals or scavenge them when they died. The tools were used to butcher the animals, although many of the animal bones from the site represent killings by other carnivores.

One context, from Duinefontein 2, dated by optically stimulated luminescence dating to 270,000 BP contained ochre that must have been introduced to the site by people and which may have been used for body adornment. If so, it would represent some of the earliest evidence of an aesthetic sensibility in early peoples.

== Sources ==
- Cruz-Uribe, K et al., 2003, Excavation of buried late Acheulean (mid-Quaternary) land surfaces at Duinefontein 2, West Cape Province, South Africa, Journal of Archaeological Science 30, 559–75, qtd in Scarre, C (ed.) (2005). The Human Past, London: Thames and Hudson. ISBN 0-500-28531-4.
