= Cuculus csarnotanus =

Cuculus csarnotanus Temporal range: Early Pliocene

Scientific classification
- Kingdom: Animalia
- Phylum: Chordata
- Class: Aves
- Order: Cuculiformes
- Family: Cuculidae
- Genus: Cuculus
- Species: †C. csarnotanus

Binomial name
- †Cuculus csarnotanus Jánossy, 1979

Extinct species of bird

Cuculus csarnotanus is an extinct species of Cuculus that lived during the Zanclean stage of the Pliocene epoch.

== Distribution ==
Cuculus csarnotanus is known from Hungary.
