= Ilbandornis =

Ilbandornis Temporal range: Late Miocene

Scientific classification
- Kingdom: Animalia
- Phylum: Chordata
- Class: Aves
- Superorder: Galloanserae
- Family: †Dromornithidae
- Genus: †Ilbandornis; Rich, 1979

Type species
- †Ilbandornis woodburnei Rich, 1979

Other species
- †I.? lawsoni Rich, 1979

Extinct genus of birds

Ilbandornis is an extinct genus of ostrich-sized dromornithid, a clade known casually as "demon ducks" because they are most closely related to the water fowl clade anseriformes. It was far more lightly built than other members of the family, indicating a more cursorial lifestyle; it was a fast runner. The majority of researchers consider Dromornithids to be herbivorous; this is borne out by molecular analysis of the gastroliths and eggshells of both Ilbandornis and the related Genyornis. While Ilbandornis and Genyornis have skulls of similar size to emus, other Dromornithids such as Dromornis have far more robust skulls with large beaks; these were previously considered an adaptation for carnivory, but their blunt edges and lack of hooked tip indicate that the species were herbivorous. It is therefore likely that the differences in skull shape are due to differences in diet. Ilbandornis went extinct sometime in the Miocene epoch.

== Size ==
Ilbandornis were very large birds, with mass estimates spanning from similar to an Ostrich to twice that weight. I. woodburnei estimates range from 114 kg to 279 kg, and I. lawsoni estimates at 106 to 134 kg.

== Taxonomy ==
Two species named by Patricia Vickers-Rich in 1979 were included in the genus: the type species Ilbandornis woodburnei and the referred species Ilbandornis lawsoni, both of which are known from the Alcoota Fossil Beds in the Northern Territory, from Waite Formation sediments dating to the Late Miocene. The local fauna at the alcoota site includes another dromornithid species, the gigantic Dromornis stirtoni. However, some researchers argue that the inclusion of both species within the genus is problematic, since I. lawsoni is either considered a species of Genyornis or synonymous with I. woodburnei.
