= Bullock Creek (Northern Territory) =

Creek and fossil site in Northern Territory

Coordinates: 17°02′10″S 131°17′38″E

The Bullock Creek Fossil site is one of three known vertebrate fossil sites in the Northern Territory of Australia, along with the Alcoota Fossil Beds and the Kangaroo Well site on Deep Well Station. It is located about 550 kilometres (340 mi) south-southeast of Darwin, on Camfield Station in the locality of Victoria River.

The Bullock Creek Fossil Site is part of the Camfield Fossil Beds which outcrop in a narrow belt about 50 km long. The Bullock Creek local fauna are approximately dated to the mid Miocene (about 12 million years ago). The Camfield Fossil Beds which contain the Bullock Creek local fauna consist of light coloured calcareous sandstone, siltstone and limestone. Ferruginous mottling is found at the base and chalcedonic silification at the top. The presentation of fossils at the site ranges from poorly sorted fragmentary lags to associations with partial skeletons which includes complete crania (skulls) with intact delicate structures.

The Bullock Creek Fossil Site is of natural significance in providing evidence for the evolution of the Northern Territory's fauna and climate.

The Bullock Creek Fossil site is part of the Camfield Fossil Beds which are one of only a few Australian localities where rare fossil marsupials are well preserved. Among the fossils at the Bullock Creek site have been found complete marsupial crania with delicate structures intact. New significant taxa identified from the Bullock Creek mid Miocene include a new genus of crocodile, Baru (Baru darrowi), a primitive true kangaroo, Nambaroo, with high-crowned lophodont teeth; and a new species of giant horned tortoise, Meiolania. New marsupial lion, thylacine, and dasyurid material has also been recovered. The extensive collection of Neohelos (large browsing marsupial) remains from the Camfield beds has initiated a review of the mid Miocene zygomaturine diprotodontids.

Together with the fossil assemblage in the Alcoota Fossil Beds to the north-east of Alice Springs, the Bullock Creek fossil fauna demonstrates systematic and community structural continuity from the mid to late Miocene in northern Australia.

The Bullock Creek assemblage contains biological evidence of seasonality (trapping of small fish in drying backwaters), while lithostratigraphic evidence (interbedded evaporites) suggests longer periods of low precipitation and probably high ambient temperatures. The assemblage provides evidence that aridification was in progress in northern Australia during the Miocene.

The fossil site was listed on the Northern Territory Heritage Register on 3 August 1996 under the name "Bullock Creek Fossil Site."
