= List of penguins =

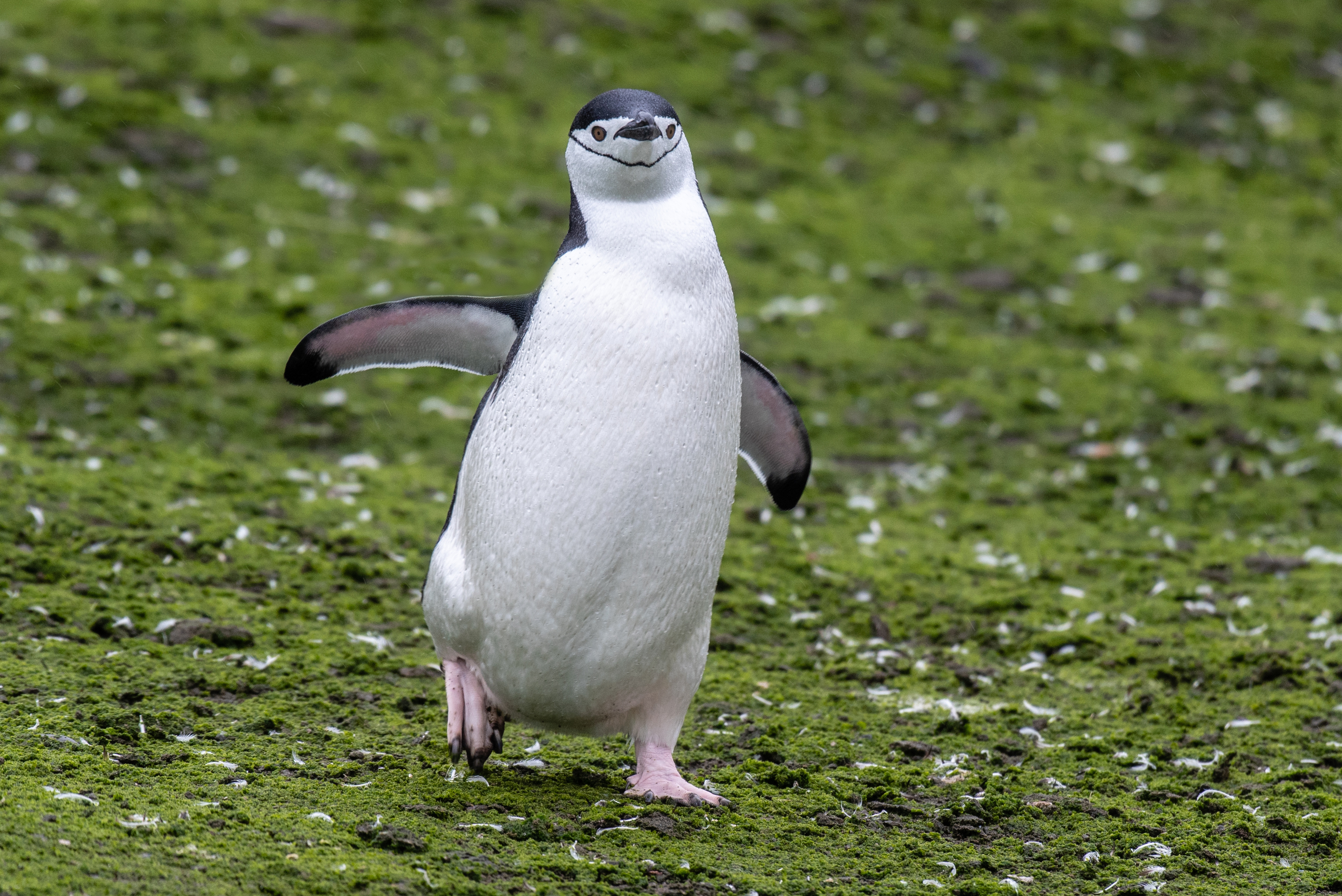
Chinstrap penguin

Penguins are birds in the family Spheniscidae in the monotypic order Sphenisciformes. They inhabit high-productivity marine habitats, almost exclusively in the southern hemisphere; the only species to occur north of the equator is the Galapagos penguin. The only group of birds other than the ratites to be entirely flightless, penguins are extremely adapted to their aquatic lifestyle, with a streamlined shape that minimizes drag, countershaded dark-and-white plumage, dense bones, powerful flippers, and insulating feathers that allow them to withstand very low temperatures on land and in water.

There are currently 18 extant species of penguins recognised by the International Ornithologists' Union, distributed among six genera. Many species of fossil penguins are known from the Paleocene onwards; however, their exact number and taxonomy are unsettled due to ongoing discoveries.

== Conventions ==
IUCN Red List categories
Conservation status
- EX: Extinct (0 species)
- EW: Extinct in the wild (0 species)
- CR: Critically endangered (1 species)
- EN: Endangered (4 species)
- VU: Vulnerable (4 species)
- NT: Near threatened (2 species)
- LC: Least concern (7 species)

Conservation status codes listed follow the International Union for Conservation of Nature (IUCN) Red List of Threatened Species. Range maps are provided wherever possible; if a range map is not available, a description of the penguin's range is provided. Ranges are based on the IOC World Bird List for that species unless otherwise noted. Population estimates are of the number of mature individuals and are taken from the IUCN Red List.

This list follows the taxonomic treatment (designation and order of species) and nomenclature (scientific and common names) of version 13.2 of the IOC World Bird List. Where the taxonomy proposed by the IOC World Bird List conflicts with the taxonomy followed by the IUCN (Note: The IUCN follows the taxonomy proposed by the HBW and BirdLife Taxonomic Checklist.) or the 2023 edition of The Clements Checklist of Birds of the World, the disagreement is noted next to the species's common name (for nomenclatural disagreements) or scientific name (for taxonomic disagreements).

== Classification ==
The International Ornithologists' Union (IOU) recognises 18 species of penguins in six genera. This list does not include hybrid species, extinct prehistoric species, or putative species not yet accepted by the IOU.

Family Spheniscidae

- Genus Aptenodytes: two species
- Genus Pygoscelis: three species
- Genus Eudyptula: one species
- Genus Spheniscus: four species
- Genus Megadyptes: one species
- Genus Eudyptes: seven species

== Penguins ==
Genus Aptenodytes – Miller, J. F., 1778 – 2 species
Common name	Scientific name and subspecies	Range	IUCN status and estimated population
King penguin	A. patagonicus Miller, J. F., 1778	Subantarctic islands	LC 1,084,320–1,228,320 breeding pairs
Emperor penguin	A. forsteri Gray, G. R., 1884	Antarctic sea ice	NT 256,500 breeding pairs

Genus Pygoscelis – Wagler, 1832 – 3 species
Common name	Scientific name and subspecies	Range	IUCN status and estimated population
Adélie penguin	P. adeliae (Hombron and Jacquinot, 1841)	Antarctica and surrounding islands	LC 10,000,000
Chinstrap penguin	P. antarcticus (Forster, J. R., 1781)	Antarctic Peninsula and Balleny Islands	LC 8,000,000
Gentoo penguin	P. papua (Forster, J. R., 1781) Four subspecies: P. p. taeniata; P. p. papua; P. p. ellsworthi; P. p. poncetii	Subantarctic islands and locally in Antarctica	LC 774,000

Genus Eudyptula – Bonaparte, 1856 – 1 species
Common name	Scientific name and subspecies	Range	IUCN status and estimated population
Little penguin	E. minor (Forster, J. R., 1781) Six subspecies: E. m. novaehollandiae; E. m. iredalei; E. m. variabilis; E. m. minor; E. m. albosignata; E. m. chathamensis	Australia and New Zealand	LC 469,760

Genus Spheniscus – Brisson, 1760 – 4 species
Common name	Scientific name and subspecies	Range	IUCN status and estimated population
Galapagos penguin	S. mendiculus Sundevall, 1871	Galápagos Islands	EN 1,200
Humboldt penguin	S. humboldti Meyen, 1834	South America	VU 23,800
Magellanic penguin	S. magellanicus (Forster, J. R., 1781)	South America	LC 2,200,000–3,200,000
African penguin	S. demersus (Linnaeus, 1758)	Coasts of Southern Africa	CR 19,800

Genus Megadyptes – Milne-Edwards, 1880 – 1 species
Common name	Scientific name and subspecies	Range	IUCN status and estimated population
Yellow-eyed penguin	M. antipodes (Hombron and Jacquinot, 1841)	New Zealand	EN 2,600–3,000

Genus Eudyptes – Vieillot, 1816 – 7 species
Common name	Scientific name and subspecies	Range	IUCN status and estimated population
Macaroni penguin	E. chrysolophus (Brandt, J. F., 1837)	Antarctic Peninsula, South America, and subantarctic islands in South Atlantic and Indian Oceans	VU 6,300,000 breeding pairs
Royal penguin	E. schlegeli Finsch, 1876	Macquarie Island and nearby islands	LC 1,340,000–1,660,000
Northern rockhopper penguin	E. moseleyi Mathews & Iredale, 1921	Tristan da Cunha, Amsterdam Island, and St. Paul Island (yellow)	EN 413,700
Southern rockhopper penguin	E. chrysocome (Forster, J. R., 1781) Two subspecies: E. c. filholi; E. c. chrysocome	South America and subantarctic islands in the Indian Ocean and New Zealand (green and blue)	VU 2,500,000
Fiordland penguin	E. pachyrhynchus Gray, G. R., 1845	New Zealand	NT 12,500–50,000
Snares penguin	E. robustus Oliver, 1953	Snares Islands	VU 63,000
Erect-crested penguin	E. sclateri Buller, 1888	Bounty and Antipodes Islands	EN 150,000

== Fossil species ==
=== Basal sphenisciformes ===
Species	Notes	Source
Waimanu manneringi		Slack et al. 2006
Muriwaimanu tuatahi		Mayr et al. 2017
Sequiwaimanu roseae		Mayr et al. 2017
Crossvallia unienwillia		Jadwiszczak et al. 2013
Crossvallia waiparensis		Mayr et al. 2019
Petradyptes stonehousei		Ksepka et al. 2023
Kaiika maxwelli		Fordyce & Thoman 2011
Kumimanu biceae		Mayr et al. 2017
Kumimanu fordycei		Ksepka et al. 2023
Kupoupou stilwelli		Blokland et al. 2019
Archaeodyptes waitahaorum		Mayr et al. 2025
Daniadyptes primaevus		Mayr et al. 2025
Waimanutaha kenlovei		Mayr et al. 2025
Waiparadyptes gracilitarsus		Mayr et al. 2025

=== Advanced sphenisciformes ===
Species	Notes	Source
Anthropornis nordenskjoldii		Jadwiszczak et al. 2002
Anthropornis grandis		Jadwiszczak et al. 2002
UCMP 321023 (Anthropornis sp.)		Ksepka & Clarke, 2010
Palaeeudyptes antarcticus		
Palaeeudyptes marplesi		
Palaeeudyptes klekowskii		Jadwiszczak et al. 2002
Palaeeudyptes gunnari	May represent the opposite sex of P. klekowskii	Jadwiszczak et al. 2002
Chilean Palaeeudyptes		
Burnside "Palaeeudyptes"		Ksepka & Clarke, 2010
Duntroon "Palaeeudyptes"		Ksepka & Clarke, 2010
Archaeospheniscus lowei		Giovanardi et al. 2021
Archaeospheniscus lopdelli		Giovanardi et al. 2021
Notodyptes wimani	Formerly Archaeospheniscus	Giovanardi et al. 2021
Delphinornis larseni		Jadwiszczak et al. 2002
Delphinornis gracilis		Jadwiszczak et al. 2002
Delphinornis arctowskii		Jadwiszczak et al. 2002
Mesetaornis polaris		Jadwiszczak et al. 2002
Marambiornis exilis		Jadwiszczak et al. 2002
Aprosdokitos mikrotero		Hospitaleche et al. 2017
Perudyptes devriesi		Ksepka & Clarke, 2010
Eretiscus tonni		Hospitaleche & Tambussi, 2008
Palaeospheniscus patagonicus		Hospitaleche & Tambussi, 2008
Palaeospheniscus bilocular		Hospitaleche & Tambussi, 2008
Palaeospheniscus bergi		Hospitaleche & Tambussi, 2008
Paraptenodytes antarcticus		Hospitaleche & Tambussi, 2008
Arthrodytes andrewsi		Hospitaleche & Tambussi, 2008
Madrynornis mirandus		Hospitaleche & Tambussi, 2008
Pachydyptes simpsoni		Park & Fitzgerald, 2012
Pachydyptes ponderosus		Giovanardi et al. 2021
Anthropodyptes gilli		Park & Fitzgerald, 2012
Pseudaptenodytes macraei		Park & Fitzgerald, 2012
Marambiornopsis sobrali		Jadwiszczak et al. 2021
Icadyptes salasi		Clarke et al. 2007
Kairuku waewaeroa		Giovanardi et al. 2021
Kairuku grebneffi		Giovanardi et al. 2021
Kairuku waitaki		Giovanardi et al. 2021
Glen Murray Kairuku sp.		Giovanardi et al. 2021
Platydyptes novaezealandiae		Giovanardi et al. 2021
Platydyptes marplesi		Giovanardi et al. 2021
Inkayacu paracasensis		Clarke et al. 2010
Pakudyptes hakataramea		Ando et al. 2024

=== Extinct species of extant genera ===
Species	Notes	Source
Spheniscus megaramphus		Hospitaleche & Tambussi, 2008
Spheniscus urbinai		Hospitaleche & Tambussi, 2008
Spheniscus chilensis		Hospitaleche & Tambussi, 2008
Spheniscus muizoni		Hospitaleche & Tambussi, 2008
Pygoscelis grandis		Hospitaleche & Tambussi, 2008
Pygoscelis tyreei		
Pygoscelis calderensis		Hospitaleche & Tambussi, 2008
Eudyptes atatu		Thomas et al. 2020
Eudyptes warhami		Cole et al. 2019
Eudyptes calauina		Hoffmeister et al. 2014
Eudyptula wilsonae		Thomas et al. 2023
Megadyptes antipodes richdalei		Cole et al. 2019
Megadyptes antipodes waitaha		Cole et al. 2019
Aptenodytes ridgeni		

=== Poorly understood taxa ===
Species	Notes	Source
Dege hendeyi		
Inguza predemersus		
Duntroonornis parvus		
Nucleornis insolitus		
Marplesornis novaezealandiae		
Korora oliveri		
Paraptenodytes robustus		
Platydyptes amiesi		

==== Invalid taxa ====
Species	Notes	Source
Tonniornis mesetaensis	Named on an isolated humerus which is unable to be compared to other species present in the same locality.	Ksepka & Clarke, 2010
Tonniornis minimum	Named on an isolated humerus which is unable to be compared to other species present in the same locality. Similar size to a specimen referred to Delphinornis larseni.	Ksepka & Clarke, 2010
Tereingaornis moisleyi	Genus is a nomen dubium due to lack of identifiable traits, but the specimen may belong to a new species (the Te Ringa Falls Penguin)	Thomas et al. 2019
Wimanornis seymourensis	Synonymous with Palaeeudypytes gunnari	
Orthopteryx gigas		Hospitaleche and Reguero, 2010
Ichtyopteryx gracilis		Hospitaleche and Reguero, 2010
Palaeoapterodytes ictus		Hospitaleche, 2010
Psuedaptenodytes minor	Lack of diagnostic characteristics on the holotype	Park & Fitzgerald, 2012

The Early Oligocene genus Cruschedula was formerly thought to belong to Spheniscidae; however, re-examination of the holotype in 1943 resulted in the genus being placed in Accipitridae. Further examination in 1980 resulted in placement as Aves incertae sedis.
