= Pakudyptes =

Pakudyptes Temporal range: late Oligocene (Waitakian stage), ~24 Ma

Scientific classification
- Kingdom: Animalia
- Phylum: Chordata
- Class: Aves
- Clade: Austrodyptornithes
- Order: Sphenisciformes
- Genus: †Pakudyptes; Ando et al., 2024
- Species: †P. hakataramea

Binomial name
- †Pakudyptes hakataramea Ando et al., 2024

Genus of extinct penguins

Pakudyptes (meaning "small diver") is a genus of extinct penguins from the late Oligocene Otekaike Limestone of New Zealand. The genus contains a single species, P. hakataramea, known from three fragmentary limb bones.

== Discovery and naming ==
The Pakudyptes fossil material was discovered in 1987 in the Hakataramea Quarry, representing sediments of the Otekaike Limestone, in the Hakataramea Valley of South Canterbury, New Zealand. The holotype specimen, OU 21977, consists of most of a left humerus. The top half of a left ulna (OU 21976) and a partial right femur (OU 21966)—both likely belonging to the same individual of the holotype—were also referred to the genus.

Following the discovery of the fossil material, it was first mentioned in the scientific literature in 1990 as the "Hakataramea bird". Later researchers in 1991 and 2004 considered it possible that the material actually belonged to the small extinct South American genus Eretiscus. However, subsequent examination of the fossil material reported in a 2007 dissertation established that the remains were indeed distinct from this genus.

In 2024, Ando et al. described Pakudyptes hakataramea as a new genus and species of extinct penguin based on these fossil remains. The generic name, Pakudyptes, combines the Māori word "paku", meaning "small", with the Greek word "dyptes"—a common suffix for penguin generic names—meaning "diver". The specific name, hakataramea, references the type locality in the Hakataramea Valley. The word itself is derived from the Māori phrases "ha-ka", referring to a dance, and "ta-ra-me-a", meaning "with speargrass".

== Description ==
Based on the preserved fossil material, Pakudyptes is classified as a tiny penguin. It was likely similar in size to the extant little blue penguin, which is 40–45 centimetres (16–18 in) long and 30–35 centimetres (12–14 in) tall when standing.

== Classification ==
In their phylogenetic analyses, Ando et al. (2024) recovered Pakudyptes as a late-diverging penguin closely related to crown-group spenisciforms. Their results are displayed in the cladogram of penguin evolutionary relationships below:

- - †Waimanu
  - †Muriwaimanu
  - - †Sequiwaimanu
    - - †Crossvallia spp.
      - - †Kumimanu spp.
        - - - †Petradyptes
            - †Kaiika
          - - †Kupoupou
            - - †Notodyptes
              - †Delphinornis spp.
              - - †Perudyptes
                - - †Anthropornis spp.
                  - - †Palaeeudyptes spp.
                    - - - †Inkayacu
                        - †Burnside Palaeeudyptes (OM C48:73–81)
                      - - †Pachydyptes
                        - †Icadyptes
                        - - †Kairuku spp.
                          - - †Archaeospheniscus lopdelli
                            - - †Archaeospheniscus lowei
                              - - †Paraptenodytes
                                - - †Platydyptes spp.
                                  - - †Pakudyptes
                                    - - - †Palaeospheniscus spp.
                                        - †Eretiscus
                                      - - †Marplesornis
                                        - crown Sphenisciformes ⇒
