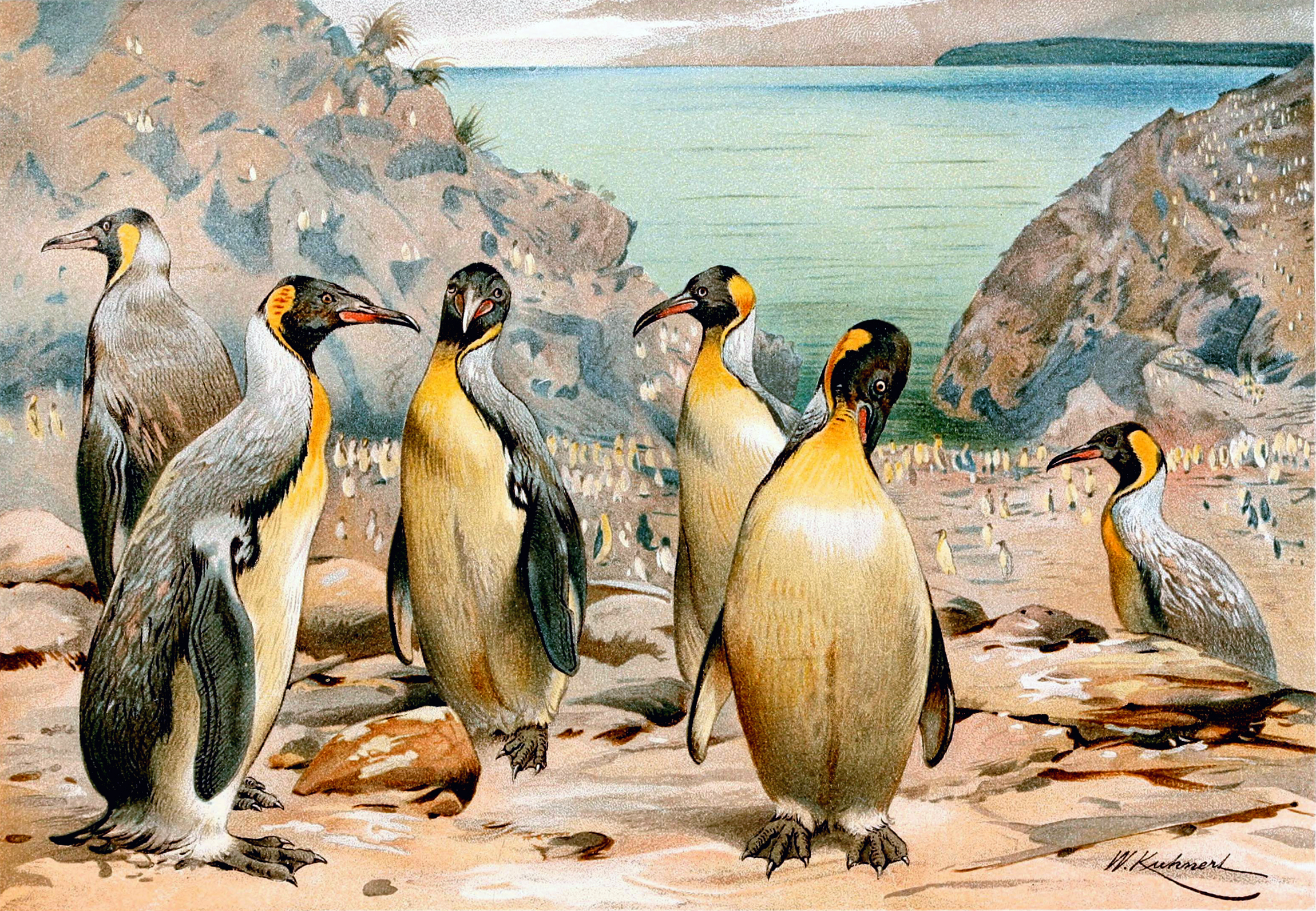
- A reconstruction of New Zealand giant penguins (Pachydyptes ponderosus), date 1893

Scientific classification
- Kingdom: Animalia
- Phylum: Chordata
- Class: Aves
- Order: Sphenisciformes
- Family: Spheniscidae
- Subfamily: †Palaeeudyptinae; Simpson, 1946

Genera
- Anthropodyptes; Anthropornis; Archaeospheniscus; Crossvallia; Delphinornis; Duntroonornis; Icadyptes; Korora; Marambiornis; Mesetaornis; Pachydyptes; Palaeeudyptes; Platydyptes

Synonyms
- Anthropornithidae Simpson, 1946

= Palaeeudyptinae =

Palaeeudyptinae Temporal range: Middle/Late Eocene -? Middle Miocene

Extinct subfamily of birds

Palaeeudyptinae, the giant penguins, is a paraphyletic subfamily of prehistoric penguins. It includes several genera of medium-sized to very large species, such as Icadyptes salasi, Palaeeudyptes marplesi, Anthropornis nordenskjoeldi, and Pachydyptes ponderosus. Icadyptes reached 1.5 m (4 ft 11 in) in height, while members of Palaeeudyptes and Anthropornis grew even taller and were some of the largest penguins to have ever existed. The massive P. ponderosus may have weighed at least as much as an adult human.

== Lineage ==
They belonged to an evolutionary lineage more primitive than modern penguins. In some taxa at least, the wing, while already having lost the avian feathering, had not yet transformed into the semi-rigid flipper found in modern penguin species: While the ulna and the radius were already flattened to increase propelling capacity, the elbow and wrist joints still retained a higher degree of flexibility than the more rigidly lockable structure found in modern genera. The decline and eventual disappearance of this subfamily seem to be connected to increased competition as mammal groups such as cetaceans and pinnipeds became better adapted to a marine lifestyle in the Oligocene and Miocene.

The members of this subfamily are known from fossils found in New Zealand, Antarctica, South America, and possibly Australia, dating from the Middle or Late Eocene to the Late Oligocene; the Australian Middle Miocene genus Anthropodyptes is also often assigned to this subfamily, as are the remaining genera of primitive penguins except those from Patagonia. Indeed, it was long assumed that all prehistoric penguins that cannot be assigned to extant genera belonged to the Palaeeudyptinae; this view is generally considered obsolete today. It is likely that some of the unassigned New Zealand/Antarctican/Australian genera like Delphinornis, Marambiornis, and Mesetaornis do indeed belong into this subfamily, but it is just as probable that others, such as Duntroonornis and Korora, represent another, smaller and possibly somewhat more advanced lineage.

The Palaeeudyptinae as originally defined (Simpson, 1946) contained only the namesake genus, the remainder being placed in the Anthropornithidae. The arrangement followed here is based on the review of Marples (1962) who synonymized the two, with updates to incorporate more current findings.
