= 1971 in paleontology =

Paleontology or palaeontology is the study of prehistoric life forms on Earth through the examination of plant and animal fossils. This includes the study of body fossils, tracks (ichnites), burrows, cast-off parts, fossilised feces (coprolites), palynomorphs and chemical residues. Because humans have encountered fossils for millennia, paleontology has a long history both before and after becoming formalized as a science. This article records significant discoveries and events related to paleontology that occurred or were published in the year 1971.

== Arthropods ==
=== Crustaceans ===
Name	Novelty	Status	Authors	Age	Type locality	Location	Notes	Images
Oplophorus roselli	Sp nov	jr synonym	Via	Barremian	Las Hoyas	Spain	Moved to the genus Delclosia	
Pseudastacus llopisi	Sp nov	jr synonym	Via	Barremian	Las Hoyas	Spain	A crayfish, moved to the genus Austropotamobius in 1997.	

== Plants ==
=== Angiosperms ===
Name	Novelty	Status	Authors	Age	Type locality	Location	Notes	Images
Holmskioldia quilchenensis	Sp nov	jr synonym	Mathewes & Brooke	Ypresian	Coldwater Beds	Canada; British Columbia	A mallow relative. moved to Florissantia quilchenensis (1992)	Florissantia quilchenensis

== Conodonts ==
Name	Novelty	Status	Authors	Age	Type locality	Country/subdivision	Notes	Image
Baltoniodus	gen nov	valid	Maurits Lindström			Sweden		
Paracordylodus	gen nov	valid	Maurits Lindström			Sweden		
Microzarkodina	gen nov	valid	Maurits Lindström			Sweden		

== Archosauromorphs ==
=== Newly named pseudosuchians ===
Name	Novelty	Status	Authors	Age	Type locality	Country/subdivision	Notes	Image
Venaticosuchus	gen et sp nov	valid	Bonaparte	Late Triassic		Argentina	an ornithosuchid	Venaticosuchus rusconii

=== Newly named dinosaurs ===
Data courtesy of George Olshevsky's dinosaur genera list.

Name	Novelty	Status	Authors	Age	Type locality	Country/subdivision	Notes	Image
Nemegtosaurus	gen et sp nov	Valid	Nowinski	Late Cretaceous	Nemegt Basin	Mongolia		
Yaverlandia	gen et sp nov	Valid	Galton	Lower Cretaceous	Wessex Formation	England	Maniraptoran?	

=== Newly named onithodirans ===
Name	Novelty	Status	Authors	Age	Type locality	Country/subdivision	Notes	Image
Lagerpeton	gen et sp nov	Valid	Romer	Ladinian	Chañares Formation	Argentina	A member of the lagerpetonidae.	Lagerpeton
Lagosuchus	fam et gen et sp nov	valid	Romer	Ladinian	Chañares Formation	Argentina		

=== Newly named birds ===
Name	Novelty	Status	Authors	Age	Type locality	Country/subdivision	Notes	Image
Anser devjatkini	Sp. nov.	Valid	Kurochkin	Late Miocene	Hyargas Nuur Formation	Mongolia	An Anatidae.	
Antillovultur	Gen. et sp. nov.	jr synonym	Arredondo	Late Quaternary	Las Breas de San Felipe	Cuba	An accipitrid, Type species A. varonai, moved to Gymnogyps varonai (2003),	
Bathornis minor	Sp. nov.	Valid	Cracraft	Early Miocene		USA; South Dakota	A bathornithid	
Bucorvus brailloni	Sp. nov.	Valid	Brunet	Middle Miocene		Morocco	A bucorvid.	
Campephilus dalquesti	Sp. nov.	Valid	Brodkorb	Late Pliocene (Blancan)		USA; Texas	A picid.	
Cerorhinca minor	Sp. nov.	Valid	Howard	Late Miocene - Late Pliocene	Almejas Formation	Mexico	An alcid.	
Cygnus pristinus	Sp. nov.	Valid	Kurochkin	Late Miocene - Early Pliocene	Chirgiz-Nur Formation	Mongolia	An anatid.	
Dolichonyx kruegeri	Sp. nov.	Valid	Fischer & Stephan	Late Pleistocene	"Cave deposits"	Cuba	An icterid.	
Eutreptornis	Gen. et sp. nov.	Valid	Cracraft	Middle Eocene	Uinta Formation	USA; Utah	A bathornithid. Type species E. uintae	
Fulica picapicensis	Sp. nov.	jr synonym	Fischer & Stephan	Quaternary	"Cave deposits"	Cuba	A flightless rallid, moved to Nesotrochis picapicensis (1974).	
Grus cubensis	Sp. nov.	Valid	Fischer & Stephan	Late Pleistocene	"Cave deposits"	Cuba	A crane. Moved to Antigone cubensis (2020).	Antigone cubensis (top)
Macrorhamphus finitimus	Sp. nov.	Valid	Kurochkin	Pliocene		Mongolia	A scolopacid, Moved to Limnodromus finitimus.	
Mancalla cedrosensis	Sp. nov.	Valid	Howard	Early Pliocene	Almejas Formation	Mexico	A mancaline alcid	
Onychopteryx	Gen. et sp. nov.	Valid	Cracraft	Early Eocene	Casamajor Formation	Argentina	An onychopterygid Type species O. simpsoni	
Phalacrocorax mongoliensis	Sp. nov.	Valid	Kurochkin	Late Miocene - Pliocene		Mongolia	A phalacrocoracid.	
?Platydyptes marplesi	Sp. nov.	Valid	Simpson	Early or Middle Oligocene (Duntroonian)		New Zealand	A spheniscid.	
Progrus	Gen. et sp. nov.	Valid	Bendukidze	Middle - Late Eocene	Kalmakpai River	Kazakhstan	An eogruid. Type species P. turanicus Moved to Eogrus turanicus.	
Proplegadis	Gen. et sp. nov.	Valid	Harrison & Walker	Early Eocene		UK; England	A possible phaethontid, Type species P. fisheri	
Puffinus tedfordi	Sp. nov.	Valid	Howard	Early Pliocene	Almejas Formation	Mexico	A procellariid.	
Spheniscus predemersus	Sp. nov.	jr synonym	Simpson	Late Pliocene	Langebaanweg fossil site	South Africa	A spheniscid, Moved to Inguza predemersus (1975)	
Spizaetus tanneri	Sp. nov.	Valid	Martin	Early Pleistocene	Broadwater Formation	USA; Nebraska	An accipitrid.	
Struthio transcaucasicus	Sp. nov.	Valid	Burchak-Abramovich & Vekua	Late Pliocene (Akchagil age)		Georgia	A struthionid.	
Wimanornis	Gen. et sp. nov.	Valid	Simpson	Eocene	Seymour Island	Antarctica	A basal spheniscid Type species W. seymourensis	

=== Newly named pterosaurs ===
Name	Novelty	Status	Authors	Age	Type locality	Country/subdivision	Notes	Image
Araripesaurus	gen et sp nov	Valid	Price	Early Cretaceous	Santana Formation	Brazil	an ornithocheirid	Araripesaurus.
Sordes	gen et sp nov	Valid	Sharov	Late Jurassic	Karabastau Svita	Kazakhstan	possible rhamphorhynchid	Sordes pilosus

== Other Animals ==
Name	Status	Authors	Age	Unit	Location	Notes	Images
Chondroplon	Valid	Wade	Ediacaran		Australia Russia	Sometimes considered a synonym of Dickinsonia	
