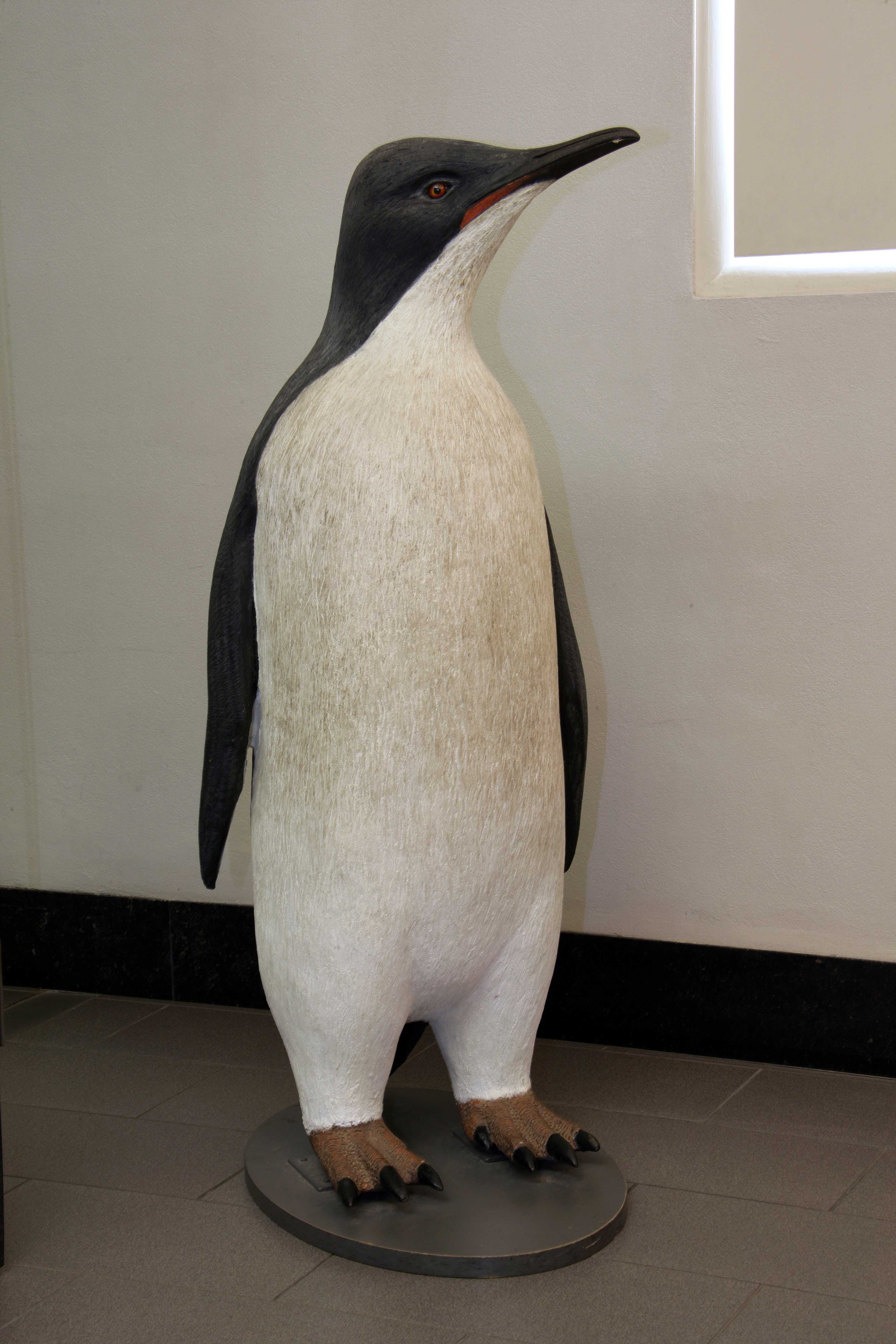
- Pachydyptes ponderosus

Scientific classification
- Kingdom: Animalia
- Phylum: Chordata
- Class: Aves
- Order: Sphenisciformes
- Family: Spheniscidae
- Subfamily: †Palaeeudyptinae
- Genus: †Pachydyptes; Oliver, 1930
- Species: †P. ponderosus

Binomial name
- †Pachydyptes ponderosus Oliver, 1930

Synonyms
- Palaeeudyptets antarcticus Hector, 1873 (partim); Pachydyptes ponderosa Lowe, 1939 (lapsus); Anthropornis ponderosus Lowe, 1939; Anthropornis ponderosa Lowe, 1939 (lapsus); Anthropornis nordenskjoldi Lowe, 1939 (partim)

= Pachydyptes =

Pachydyptes Temporal range: Late Eocene 37–34 Ma

Extinct genus of birds

Pachydyptes (Pachydyptes ponderosus), also known as the New Zealand giant penguin, is an extinct genus of penguin. This taxon is known from a few bones from Late Eocene (37 to 34 MYA) rocks in the area of Otago, which were found in two clades near a base of a tree (Ksepka et al., 2006).

G.G. Simpson, an evolutionary biologist, estimated a height of 140 to 160 cm (about 5 ft) and a weight of around 80 to possibly over 100 kg (Stonehouse, 1975). It was the second-tallest penguin ever, surpassed only by Anthropornis nordenskjoeldi in height, but probably not in weight. This was because of the clade's evolutionary history, where many early penguins were typically found larger in size (Ksepka et al., 2006).

G.G. Simpson had also claimed from the fossil records that the Pachydyptes along with many other early penguin species, descended from flying ancestors (Stonehouse, 1975).

Pachydyptes was slightly larger than Icadyptes salasi, the best-identified of the giant penguins.
