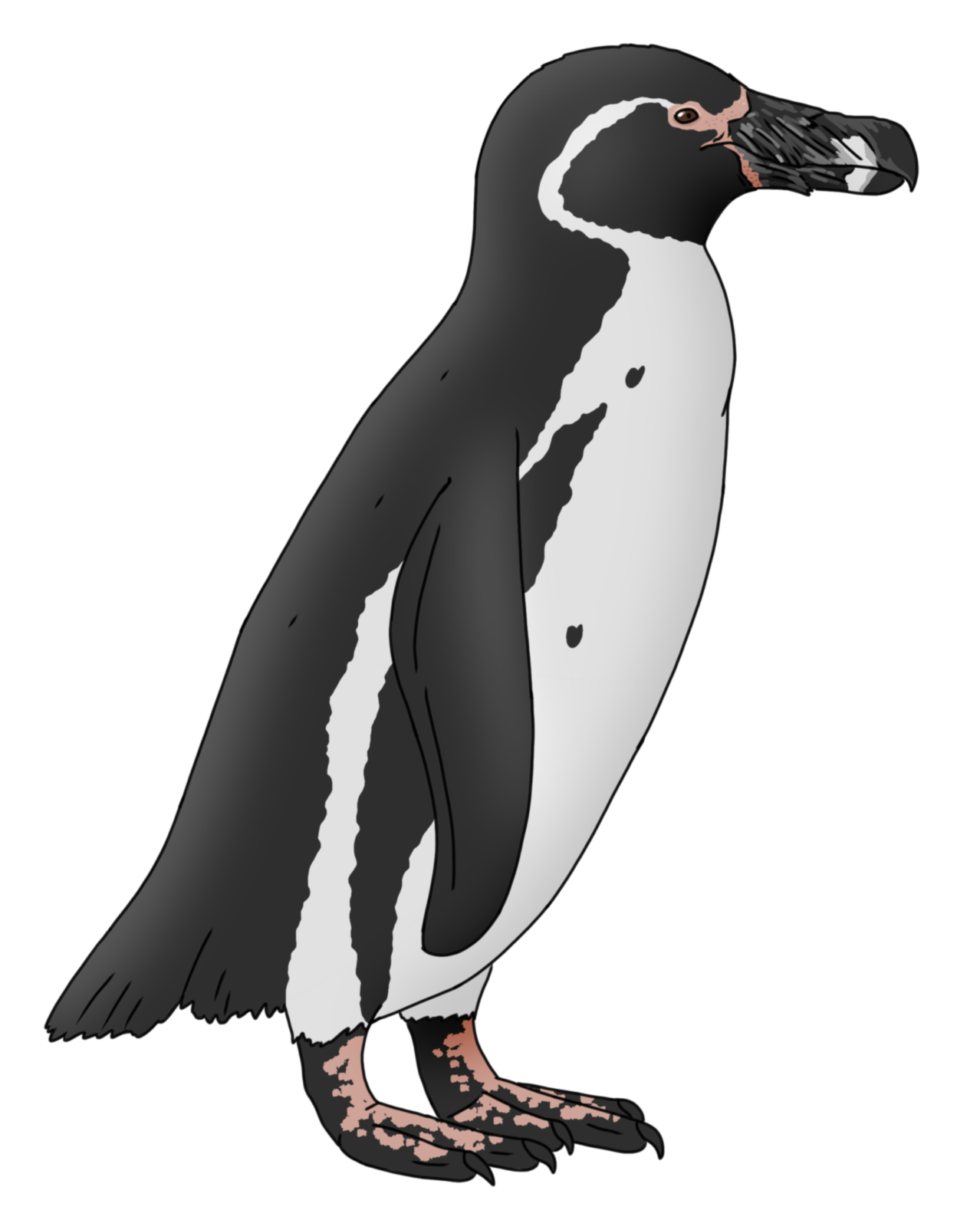

Scientific classification
- Domain: Eukaryota
- Kingdom: Animalia
- Phylum: Chordata
- Class: Aves
- Order: Sphenisciformes
- Family: Spheniscidae
- Genus: Spheniscus
- Species: †S. anglicus

Binomial name
- †Spheniscus anglicus Benson, 2015

= Spheniscus anglicus =

Spheniscus anglicus Temporal range: Late Miocene

Extinct species of penguin

Spheniscus anglicus is an extinct species of banded penguin that lived during the Late Miocene in what is now Chile, South America. The species was described in 2015 by Richard D. Benson based on a fossil found in the Bahia Inglesa Formation in northern Chile.

== Description ==
The holotype material consists of a fossil penguin skull, without a beak. The species is described as smaller than the emperor penguin or the king penguin, but larger than any other in the genus.

=== Discovery and naming ===
The only known current fossil of Spheniscus anglicus was recovered from the Bahia Inglesa Formation at an unknown date, and later sold at the 2001 Tucson Gem & Mineral Show to Mark Rasmussen, who later donated it to the Science Museum of Minnesota. The species is named after the Bahia Inglesa Formation in which the fossil was found.
