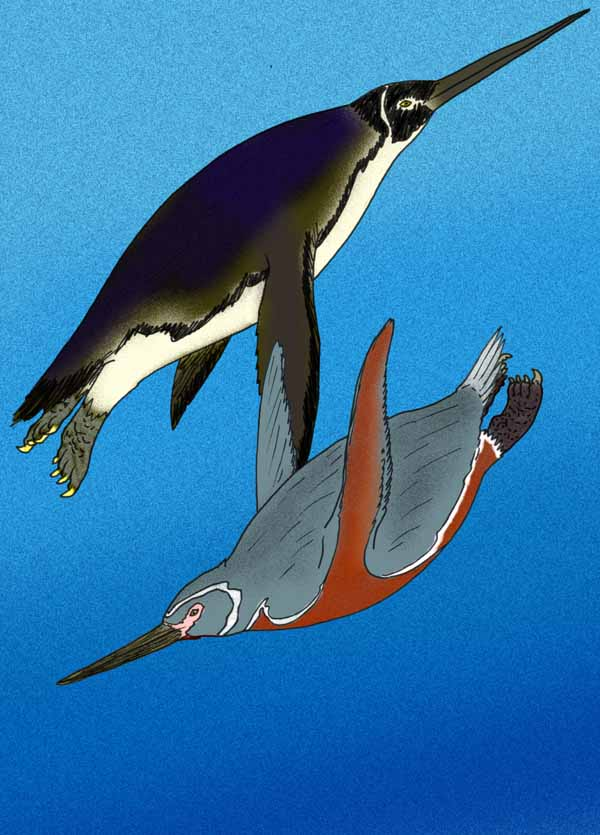
- Restorations of Inkayacu (below) and Icadyptes

Scientific classification
- Kingdom: Animalia
- Phylum: Chordata
- Class: Aves
- Order: Sphenisciformes
- Family: Spheniscidae
- Genus: †Inkayacu; Clarke et al., 2010
- Species: †I. paracasensis

Binomial name
- †Inkayacu paracasensis Clarke et al. 2010

= Inkayacu =

Inkayacu Temporal range: Late Eocene (Divisaderan-Tinguirirican) ~37.2–33.9 Ma

Extinct species of red-bellied penguin

Inkayacu is a genus of extinct penguins. It lived in what is now Peru during the Late Eocene, around 36 million years ago. The only species, I. paracasensis, was named from a single nearly complete skeleton discovered in 2008. It includes fossilized feathers, the first known in penguins. A study of the melanosomes, pigment-containing organelles within the feathers, indicated that they were gray or reddish brown. This differs from modern penguins, which get their dark black-brown feathers from unique melanosomes that are large and ellipsoidal.

== Etymology ==
The genus name derives from the Quechua words Inka for emperor or king and yacu for water, thus the name translates to "Water Emperor" or, more idiomatic, "king of the water". The specific epithet, paracasensis, refers to Paracas, where the fossils were found.

== Description ==
Although it was an early penguin, Inkayacu closely resembled its modern relatives. It had paddle-like wings with short feathers, and a very long bill. Inkayacu, along with other extinct penguins from Peru, are often referred to as giant penguins because of their large size. Inkayacu was among the largest described fossil penguins, measuring 1.5 metres (4.9 ft) long and weighing about 54.6–59.4 kilograms (120–131 lb), twice as heavy as the average emperor penguin, the largest extant penguin.

The melanosomes within the feathers of Inkayacu are long and narrow, similar to most other birds. Their shape suggests that Inkayacu had grey and reddish-brown feathering across its body. Most modern penguins have melanosomes that are about the same length as those of Inkayacu, but are much wider. There is also a greater number of them within living penguins' cells. The shape of these melanosomes gives them a dark brown or black color, and is the reason why modern penguins are mostly black and white. Despite not having the distinctive melanosomes of modern penguins, the feathers of Inkayacu were similar in many other ways. The melanosomes within the feathers provides both color and wear resistance. The feathers that made up the body contour of the bird have large shafts, and the primaries along the edge of the wings are short and undifferentiated. The nanostructure of penguin feathers was modified after earlier macrostructural modifications of the feather shape that has been linked to aquatic flight.

== Discovery ==
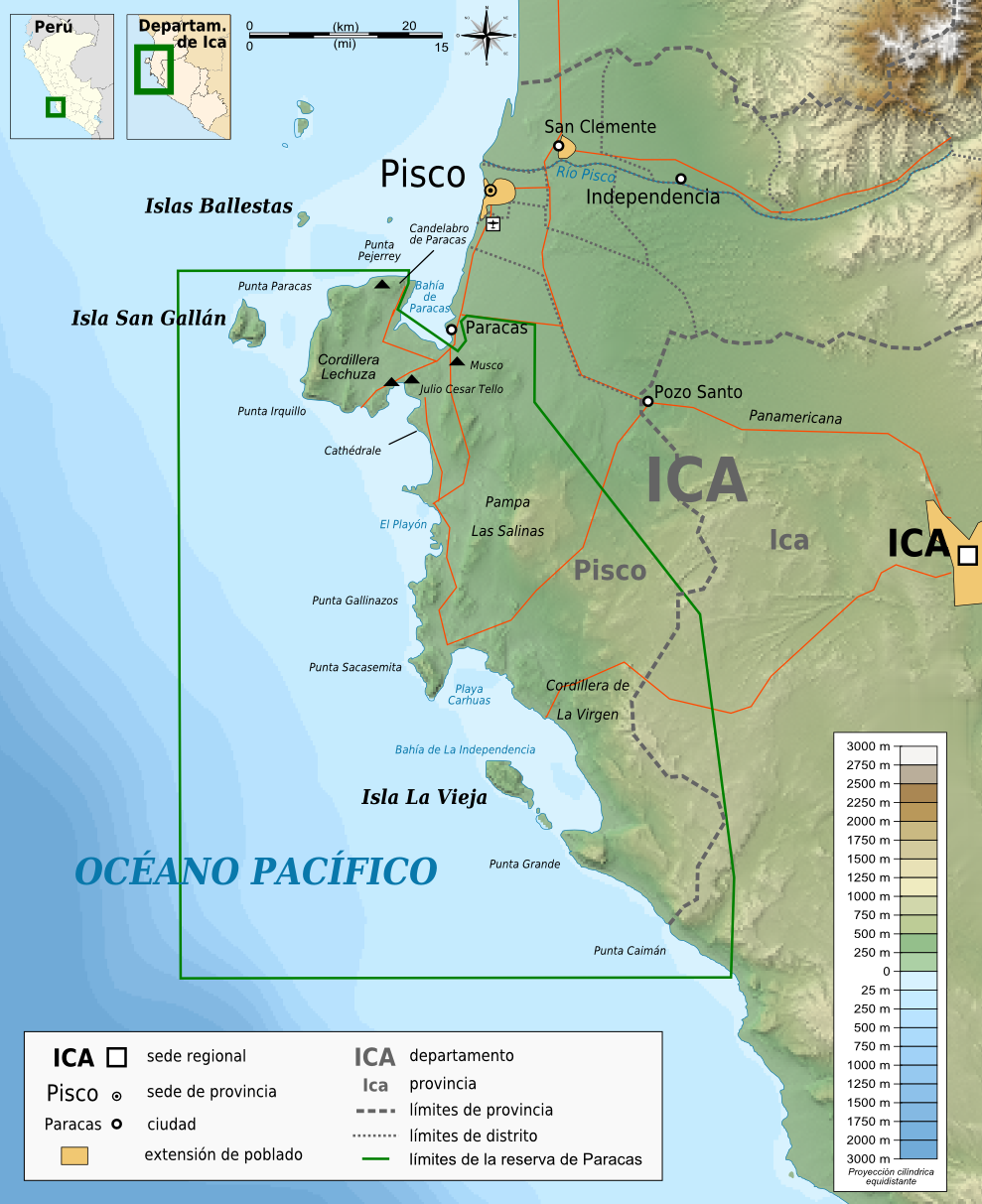
Map of the Paracas National Reservation in Ica, Peru, where remains of Inkayacu have been found.

Fossils of Inkayacu were first found in 2008 on the Pacific coast of Ica, Peru. A nearly complete skeleton was uncovered from the Otuma Formation, in the Paracas National Reserve by an expedition team led by Rodolfo Salas and studied by a team led by Julia Clarke of the University of Texas. It was nicknamed, "Pedro," by the researchers that had discovered it. This had been the first recovered fossil with feathers attached to it. The feathers were well enough preserved that researchers Julia Clarke, Liliana D'Alba and Ali J. Altamirano were able to perform analysis of melanosomes. Until now, without the addition of feathers, there has not been any research conducted on the nanostructure of ancient feathers. Large penguins, including the species Perudyptes devriesi and Icadyptes salasi, had been described from the area the previous year.

The first evidence of melanosomes in fossilized feathers was published in late 2008, being reported from an Early Cretaceous bird. Paleontologist Jakob Vinther, an author of the 2007 paper on the first fossilized melanosomes known, found melanosomes in the feathers of Inkayacu soon after the fossil was discovered. This discovery gives insight into how the evolutionary history of Inkayacu has affected the morphology of its extant descendants.

== Paleobiology ==
Inkayacu inhabited a sea that existed in Peru during the Late Eocene. Paddle-like limbs enabled an aquatic lifestyle. The large tightly packed melanosomes within the cells of living penguins gives the feathers added rigidity, which may be an adaptation for coping with the stresses of underwater flight. Because Inkayacu has smaller and fewer melanosomes, it may not have been able to swim very deep, possibly remaining near the surface. However, it is also possible that the melanosomes of modern penguins do not give them an advantage underwater, since the feathers on their undersides are primarily white, lacking the rigidity of melanin. If melanin is present in the feathers to add rigidity, it would be expected that all feathers on living penguins would be black.

== See also ==
- Dinosaur coloration
