= Takatika Grit =

Geologic formation in the Chatham Islands, New Zealand

- Stratigraphic range: Late Early to Mid Paleocene 63–60 Ma
- Type: Formation
- Unit of: Tioriori Group
- Sub-units: TaP1, TaP2, TaS1, TaS2
- Underlies: Tutuiri Greensand
- Overlies: Chatham Schist
- Thickness: 5.7 metres exposed

Lithology
- Primary: Grit, sandstone

Location
- Region: Chatham Islands (Chatham Island)
- Country: New Zealand

The Takatika Grit is a geologic formation in Chatham Islands, New Zealand. It preserves fossils dating back to the Paleocene period, although it also preserves disturbed and re-worked Maastrichtian and Campanian microfossils and tetrapod fossils. A 2017 study found that it dated to late Early to Mid Paleocene on the basis of dinoflagellates. It has been subdivided into two informal units, a lower phosphatic unit containing bones and nodular phosphatic layers, and an upper unit with abundant sponge remains and siliceous microfossils.

== Description ==
The two informal units are further subdivided into two units each, the lower is divided into the lower TaP1 which consists of "poorly sorted, phosphatized grit with abundant phosphorite nodules and bones" and the upper TaP2 which consists of "nodular bedded sandstone and grit". The upper biosiliceous unit is divided into the lower TaS1, which is heavily bioturbated, and the upper TaS2 "characterized by parallel laminations and sinusoidal ripples".

== Paleofauna ==
Paleofauna of the Takatika Grit
Genus	Species	Location	Stratigraphic position	Abundance	Notes
Astrophorida indet.	indeterminate	Tioriori			Only fragmentary spicules are known
Auloplax? (Dactylocalycidae indet.?)	A? sp.	Tioriori			Hexactinellid sponge
Bacillariophyceae indet.	Indeterminate	Tioriori			Diatoms from the Takatika Grit date back to the Danian and Campanian
Chlamydoselachus	Indeterminate	Tioriori			
Dinoflagellata indet.	Indeterminate	Tioriori			Dinoflagellates from the Takatika Grit date back to the Danian and Campanian
Edaphodon	E. kawai	Tioriori			
Elasmosauridae indet.	indeterminate	Tioriori	lower (?) Takatika Grit		Almost certainly reworked from older sediments.
Eotretochone	E. australis	Tioriori			Hexactinellid sponge
Euretidae indet.	Indeterminate	Tioriori			
Kupoupou	K. stilwelli	Tioriori			Penguin
Gastropoda indet.	Indeterminate	Tioriori			
Lithistida indet.	Indeterminate	Tioriori			Known from scarce weathered fragments
Lycopodiopsida indet.	Indeterminate	Tioriori			
Mosasauridae indet.	Indeterminate	Tioriori	lower (?) Takatika Grit		Almost certainly reworked from older sediments.
Radiolaria indet.	Indeterminate	Tioriori			Radiolarians from the Takatika Grit date back to the Danian and Campanian
Pararete	P. sp.	Tioriori			Hexactinellid sponge
Theropoda indet.	Indeterminate	Tioriori	lower (?) Takatika Grit	Vertebral centrum, tibia head, proximal pedal phalanx, manual ungual, proximal manual phalanx	Initially suggested to represent evidence of Palaeogene dinosaurs. Almost certainly reworked from older sediments.
Tretodictyiidae indet.	Indeterminate	Tioriori			

== See also ==
- Tupuangi Formation
