= Petradyptes =

Petradyptes Temporal range: Late Paleocene, ~60–55 Ma

Scientific classification
- Kingdom: Animalia
- Phylum: Chordata
- Class: Aves
- Order: Sphenisciformes
- Genus: †Petradyptes; Ksepka et al., 2023
- Species: †P. stonehousei

Binomial name
- †Petradyptes stonehousei Ksepka et al., 2023

Extinct genus of penguin

Petradyptes is an extinct genus of penguin that lived during the Late Paleocene epoch, between 60 and 55 million years ago. The genus currently contains one known species, Petradyptes stonehousei.

Petradyptes stonehousei was first described in 2023 by an international team of researchers, including scientists from the University of Cambridge and the Museum of New Zealand Te Papa Tongarewa. The fossils of Petradyptes stonehousei were discovered in 57 million-year-old beach boulders in North Otago, on New Zealand's South Island, between 2016 and 2017. The fossils were then exposed from within the boulders by Al Manning. They have been identified as being between 59.5 and 55.5 million years old, marking their existence as roughly five to 10 million years after the end-Cretaceous extinction which led to the extinction of non-avian dinosaurs.

Petradyptes stonehousei was smaller than its contemporary Kumimanu fordycei, but still well above the weight of an emperor penguin. The name Petradyptes combines the Greek 'petra' for rock and 'dyptes' for diver, a play on the diving bird being preserved in a boulder.

Phylogenetic analyses recover Kumimanu and Petradyptes crownward of the early Paleocene mainland New Zealand taxa Waimanu and Muriwaimanu, but stemward of the Chatham Island taxon Kupoupou.
