= Julia Clarke =

American paleontologist

Julia Allison Clarke
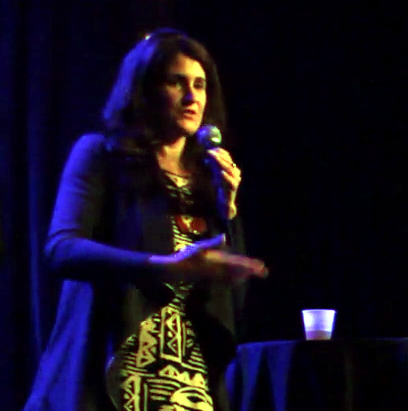
- Presenting in Texas
- Occupation: Academic
- Employer: University of Texas
- Known for: study of avian dinosaurs

Julia Allison Clarke is an American paleontologist and evolutionary biologist who studies the evolution of birds and the dinosaurs most closely related to living birds. She is the John A. Wilson Professor in Vertebrate Paleontology in the Jackson School of Geosciences and a Howard Hughes Medical Institute Professor at the University of Texas at Austin.

== Education ==
Clarke graduated with a B.A. in Comparative Literature and Geobiology from Brown University in 1995. She went on to study at Yale University, earning a Ph.D. from the Department of Geology and Geophysics in 2002.

== Career ==
In 2005, Clarke led a research team that reexamined a fossil discovered within the rocks of Vega Island in the Antarctic in 1992. Computer tomography (CT) scans allowed for a more detailed analysis of the partial skeleton than had been possible earlier. It was determined to be Vegavis iaai, an extinct Antarctic bird and early relative of ducks and geese and thought to be the only species of modern bird to have lived at the time of the dinosaurs.

Clarke also studied the voice organ (syrinx) of a fossil originally found in 1992. The findings by Clarke and other researchers were published in the science journal Nature.

Fossils of the ancient bird Inkayacu were first discovered in 2008, on the Pacific coast of Ica, Peru. A nearly complete skeleton was uncovered in the Paracas National Reserve by a team led by Rodolfo Salas and studied by a team led by Clarke. This was the first recovered fossil with feathers attached to it. The feathers were preserved enough such that Liliana D'Alba and Ali J. Altamirano were able to perform a novel analysis of the melanosomes, which have the melanin pigment which gives color to the feathers. This research on the nanostructure of ancient feathers was novel. Large penguins, including the species Perudyptes devriesi and Icadyptes salasi, had been described from the area the previous year.

In 2014, Clarke and collaborators published findings that the reconstruction of colors of featherless dinosaurs may not be possible because they lack diversity in the colored melanosomes.

In 2016, Clarke speculated that, based on her research, it was unlikely that dinosaurs roared. She proposed that it was much more likely that they made noises similar to those made by a modern pigeon.

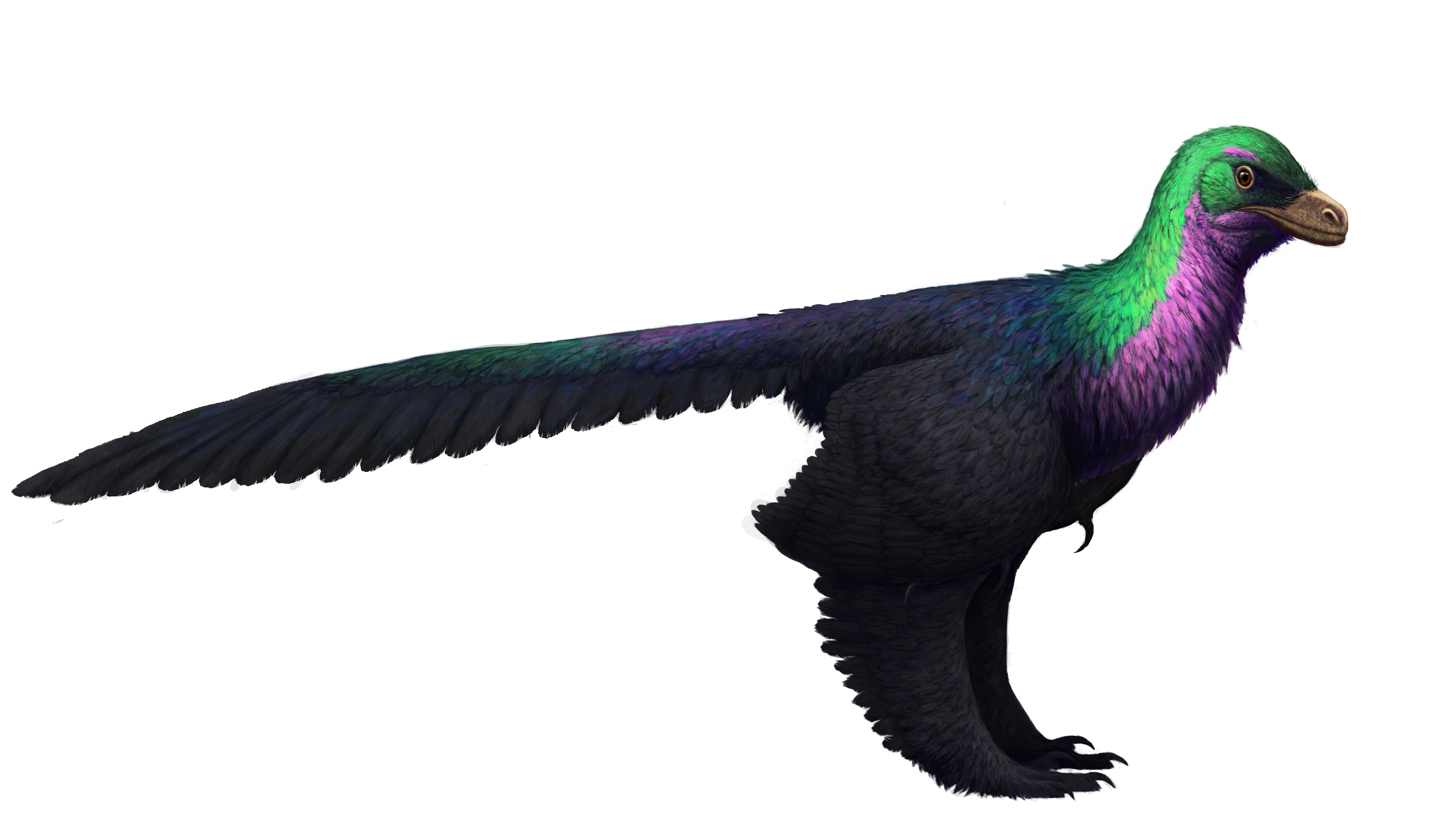
Life restoration of Caihong

In 2018, Clarke reported on a small chicken-sized dinosaur that was found in China by a farmer. The dinosaur was relatively well preserved and analysis indicated that it had multi-feathers. The creature is not thought to have been able to fly, but appears to have been a small carnivore. The feather's purpose may have been insulation whilst the variation in color is thought to have made the dinosaur attractive to a potential mate. The creature is thought to have a multi colored crest and this translates to its scientific name, which is Caihong juji.

Several of Clarke's technical papers have been published in Nature and Science.

Below is a list of taxa that Clarke has contributed to naming:

Year	Taxon	Authors
2026	Doolysaurus huhmini gen. et sp. nov.	Jung, Kim, Jo, & Clarke
2025	Masillaraptor buchheimi sp. nov.	Li, Musser, Aase, & Clarke
2025	Arboroharamiya fuscus sp. nov.	Li, D'Alba, Debruyn, Dobson, Zhou, Clarke, Vinther, Li, & Shawkey
2024	Paakniwatavis grandei gen. et sp. nov.	Musser & Clarke
2020	Nahmavis grandei gen. et sp. nov.	Musser & Clarke
2020	Sinoergilornis guangheensis gen. et sp. nov.	Musser, Li, & Clarke
2018	Panraogallus hezhengensis gen. et sp. nov.	Li, Clarke, Eliason, Stidham, Deng, & Zhou
2018	Caihong juji gen. et sp. nov.	Hu, Clarke, Eliason, Qiu, Li, Shawkey, Zhao, D'Alba, Jiang, & Xu
2016	Calciavis grandei gen. et sp. nov.	Nesbitt & Clarke
2016	Changzuiornis ahgmi gen. et sp. nov.	Huang, Wang, Hu, Liu, Peteya, & Clarke
2014	Falco hezhengensis sp. nov.	Li, Zhou, Deng, Li, & Clarke
2010	Celericolius acriala gen. et sp. nov.	Ksepka & Clarke
2009	Paracoracias occidentalis gen. et sp. nov.	Clarke, Kespka, Smith, & Norell
2008	Pengornis houi gen. et sp. nov.	Zhou, Clarke, & Zhang
2007	Perudyptes devriesi gen. et sp. nov.	Clarke, Ksepka, Stucchi, Urbina, Giannini, Bertelli, Narváez, & Boyd
2007	Icadyptes salasi gen. et sp. nov.	Clarke, Ksepka, Stucchi, Urbina, Giannini, Bertelli, Narváez, & Boyd
2005	Vegavis iaai gen. et sp. nov.	Clarke, Tambussi, Noriega, Erickson & Ketcham

== Works include ==
- The Morphology and Systematic Position of Ichthyornis Marsh and the Phylogenetic Relationships of Basal Ornithurae, 2002
- Fossil Evidence for Evolution of the Shape and Color of Penguin Feathers, 2010
- Reconstruction of Microraptor and the Evolution of Iridescent Plumage, 2012
- Melanosome evolution indicates a key physiological shift within feathered dinosaurs, 2014
- Convergent evolution in dippers (Aves, Cinclidae): The only wing‐propelled diving songbirds, 2022
- Precise and nonscalar timing of intervals in a bird vocalization, 2022
