= Anthropodyptes =

Anthropodyptes Temporal range: Middle Miocene

Scientific classification
- Domain: Eukaryota
- Kingdom: Animalia
- Phylum: Chordata
- Class: Aves
- Order: Sphenisciformes
- Family: Spheniscidae
- Subfamily: †Palaeeudyptinae (?)
- Genus: †Anthropodyptes; Simpson, 1959
- Species: †A. gilli

Binomial name
- †Anthropodyptes gilli Simpson, 1959

Extinct genus of birds

Anthropodyptes is a poorly known monotypic genus of extinct penguin. It contains the single species Anthropodyptes gilli, known from a Middle Miocene humerus from Australia. The bone is somewhat similar to those found in members of the New Zealand genus Archaeospheniscus and thus this genus might, like them, belong to the subfamily Palaeeudyptinae.
