= Inguza =

Inguza Temporal range: Late Pliocene

Scientific classification
- Domain: Eukaryota
- Kingdom: Animalia
- Phylum: Chordata
- Class: Aves
- Order: Sphenisciformes
- Family: Spheniscidae
- Genus: †Inguza; Simpson, 1975
- Species: †I. predemersus

Binomial name
- †Inguza predemersus Simpson, 1975

Synonyms
- Genus-level: Insuza (lapsus); Species-level: Spheniscus predemersus

Extinct genus of birds

Inguza predemersus is an extinct species of penguin. It was formerly placed in the genus Spheniscus and presumed to be a close relative of the African penguin, but after its well-distinct tarsometatarsus was found, it was moved into its present monotypic genus. The known fossils specimens were found in Late Pliocene rocks in a quarry at Langebaanweg, South Africa, from about 5 million years ago.

What is known from molecular data is that the time at which the present species lived is not too distant from the arrival of the ancestors of the African penguin on the Atlantic coasts of southern Africa. On the other hand, it may be closer to Pygoscelis. This would mean that its ancestors diverged from those of the extant Pygoscelis most likely at an indeterminate point of time during the Oligocene.

Alternatively, it might not be close to extant penguins (the Spheniscinae), but a late survivor of an extinct lineage. This is not very likely given its age — it would be the last known survivor of the non-spheniscine penguins — but as some of these still lived a few million years ago, it cannot be ruled out.
