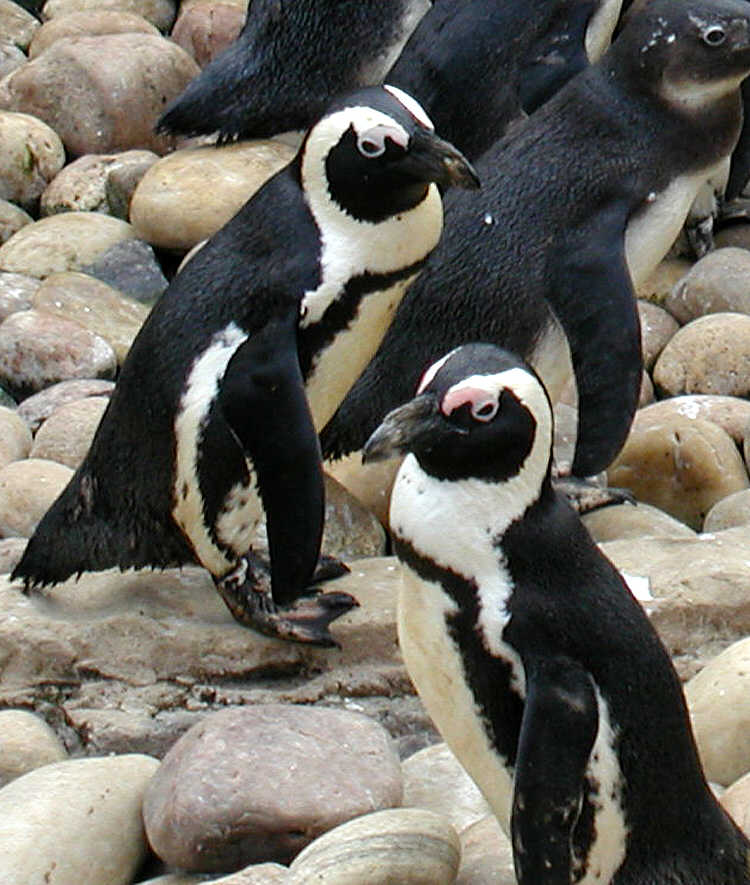
- Spheniscus demersus, the African penguin

Scientific classification
- Kingdom: Animalia
- Phylum: Chordata
- Class: Aves
- Order: Sphenisciformes
- Family: Spheniscidae
- Genus: Spheniscus; Brisson, 1760

Type species
- Diomedea demersa Linnaeus, 1758

Species
- S. demersus (Linnaeus 1758); S. humboldti Meyen 1834; S. magellanicus (Forster 1781); S. mendiculus Sundevall 1871; †S. anglicus Benson, 2015; †S. chilensis Emslie & Correa 2003; †S. megaramphus Stucchi et al. 2003; †S. muizoni Göhlich 2007; †S. urbinai Stucchi 2002

= Banded penguin =

Banded penguin Temporal range: Middle Miocene-Recent 13–0 Ma

Genus of birds

The banded penguins are penguins that belong to the genus Spheniscus. There are four living species, all with similar banded plumage-patterns. They are sometimes also known as "jack-ass penguins" due to their loud locator-calls sounding similar to a donkey braying. Common traits include a band of black that runs around their bodies bordering their black dorsal coloring, black beaks with a small vertical white band, distinct spots on their bellies, and a small patch of unfeathered or thinly feathered skin around their eyes and underdeveloped fluff sack that can be either white or pink. All members of this genus lay eggs and raise their young in nests situated in burrows or in natural depressions in the earth.

== Systematics ==
Banded penguins belong to the genus Spheniscus, which was introduced by the French zoologist Mathurin Jacques Brisson in 1760 with the African penguin (Spheniscus demersus) as the type species. The genus name Spheniscus is derived from the Ancient Greek word σφήν (sphẽn) meaning "wedge" and is a reference to the animal's thin, wedge-shaped flippers.

== Species ==
=== Extant ===
The four extant species of banded penguins (Spheniscus) are:

Genus Spheniscus – Brisson, 1760 – four species
Common name	Scientific name and subspecies	Range	Size and ecology	IUCN status and estimated population
Magellanic penguin	Spheniscus magellanicus (Forster, 1781)	Brazil, coastal Argentina, Chile and the Falkland Islands	Size: 61–76 cm (24–30 in) long and weight between 2.7 and 6.5 kg (6.0 and 14.3 lb). Habitat: Diet:	LC
Humboldt penguin	Spheniscus humboldti Meyen, 1834	coastal Chile and Peru	Size: 56–70 cm (22–28 in) long and a weight of 2.9 to 6 kg (6.4 to 13.2 lb). Habitat: Diet:	VU
Galapagos penguin	Spheniscus mendiculus Sundevall, 1871	Galápagos Islands.	Size: 48–50 centimetres (19–20 in) long and weighs around 2–4 kilograms (4.4–8.8 lb). Habitat: Diet:	EN
African penguin	Spheniscus demersus (Linnaeus, 1758)	24 islands and 3 mainland locations between Namibia and Algoa Bay, near Port Elizabeth, South Africa.	Size: 60–70 cm (24–28 in) long and weigh between 2.2–3.5 kg (4.9–7.7 lb). Habitat: Diet:	CR

=== Extinct ===
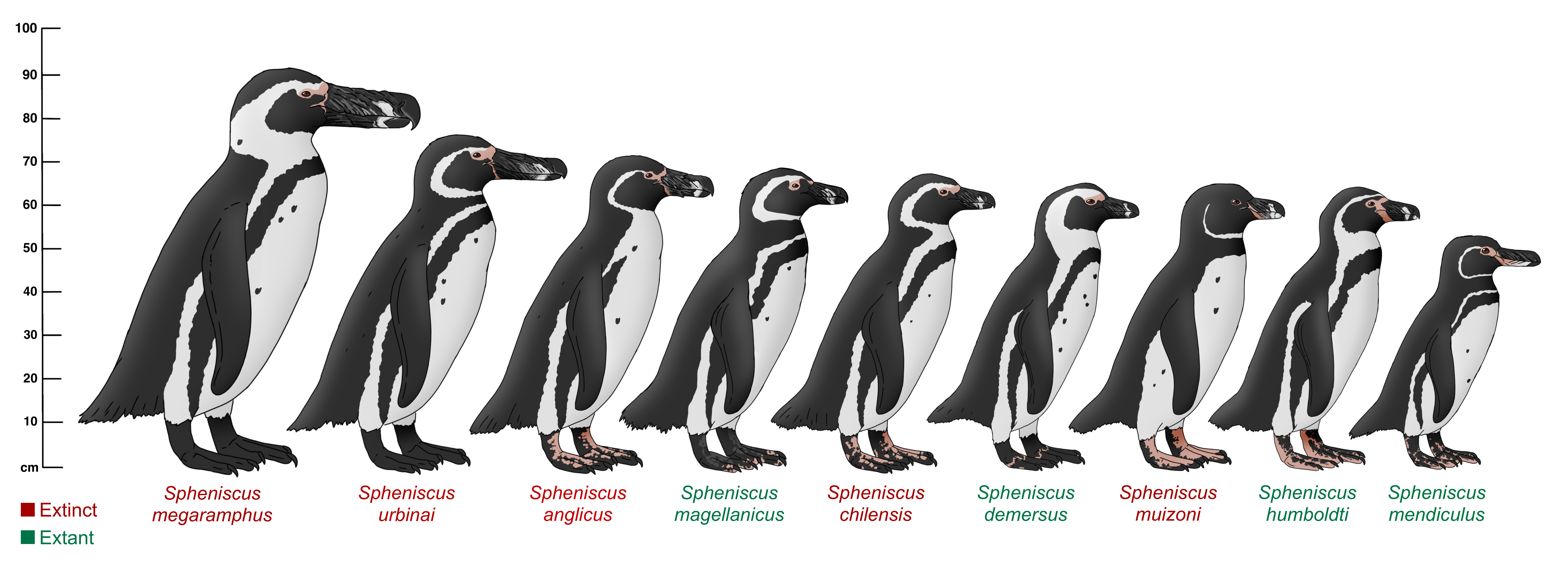
All currently recognized Spheniscus species, extant and extinct

Several extinct species are known from fossils:

- † Spheniscus anglicus (Late Miocene of Chile)
- † Spheniscus chilensis (Late Miocene/Early Pliocene of Chile)
- † Spheniscus megaramphus (Late Miocene/Early Pliocene of Peru and Chile)
- † Spheniscus muizoni (Middle/Late Miocene of Cerro La Bruja, Peru)
- † Spheniscus urbinai (Late Miocene/Early Pliocene of Peru and Chile)

The former Spheniscus predemersus is now placed in a monotypic genus Inguza.

== Range ==
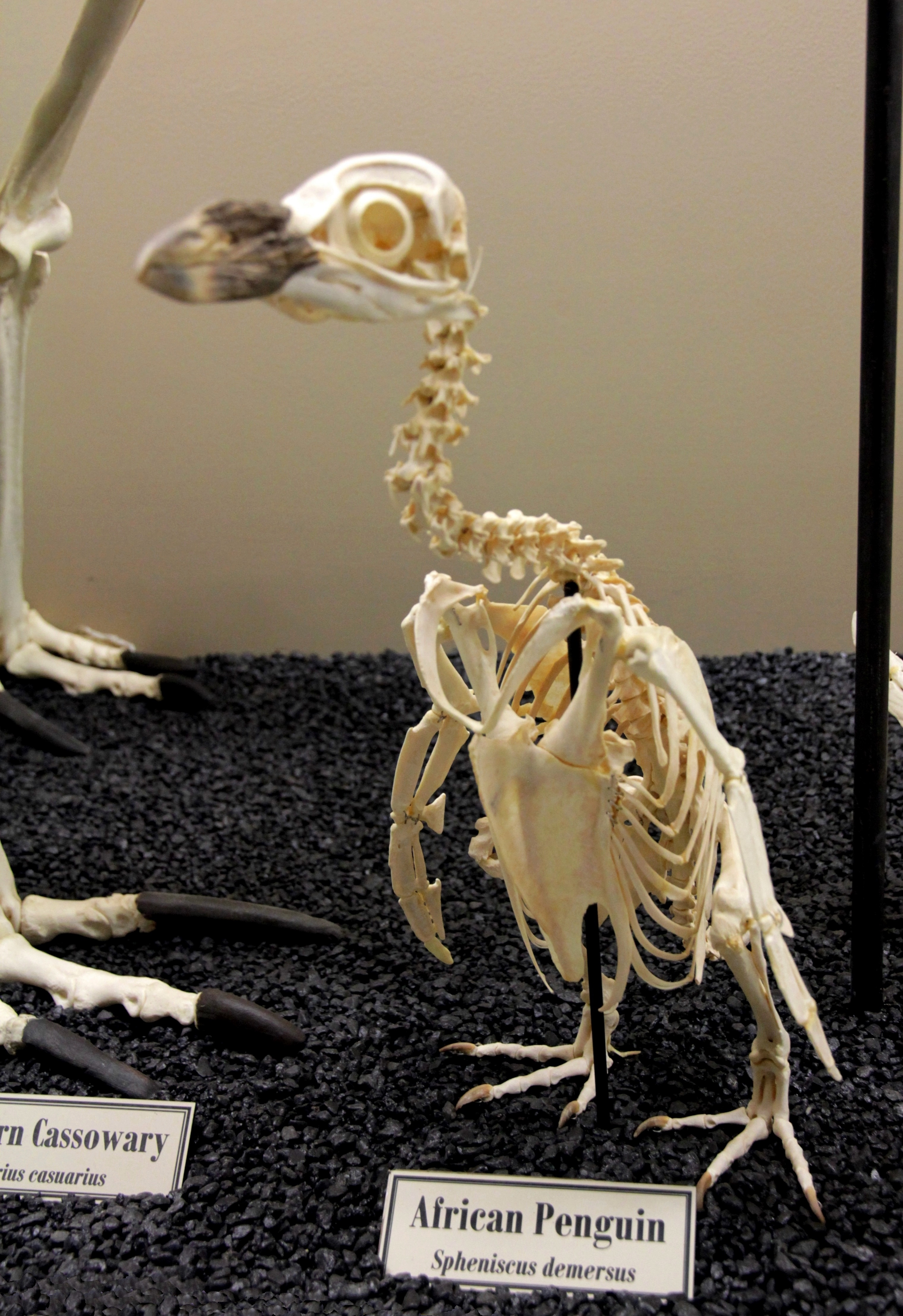
African penguin skeleton (Museum of Osteology)

Scientists believe that the genus Spheniscus originated in South America, even though the oldest fossils assigned to the taxon are from Antarctica. The oldest Spheniscus fossils are also the oldest penguin fossils from Antarctica. African, Humboldt, and Magellanic penguins all live in temperate climates. The African penguin lives in South Africa, the Humboldt penguin lives in coastal Peru and Chile while the Magellanic penguin lives in coastal Chile, Argentina, and the Falkland Islands. Humboldt and Magellanic penguins are partially sympatric, since their ranges overlap in southern Chile. The Galápagos penguin is endemic to the Galápagos Islands, making it the most northerly of all penguin species.

== Vocalizations ==
Banded penguins use vocalizations for localization, socialization and to allow recognition for conspecifics or mates. Vocalizations in birds are produced by vibrations of the syrinx, located at the bottom of the trachea. These penguins are sometimes referred to as "jack-ass" penguins, since their vocalizations tend to sound similar to a donkey braying. Vocalizations in adult penguins can be classified into four distinct categories based on its acoustic properties and the behavioural context in which a vocalization is produced. The four categories of vocalizations include contact calls, agonistic calls, ecstatic display songs or mutual display songs.

=== Contact calls ===
Contact calls are vocalizations used primarily to maintain unity within a social group, to identify ones self and to maintain contact with a mate. Vocal individuality has evolved in banded penguins due to their large social group sizes. Contact calls are frequently used by banded penguins to form large flocks when foraging at sea. It is easy to become separated while diving for food, therefore these penguins use contact calls to stay in contact with each other when they are out of sight. A contact call can relay an excess of information about an individual penguin, including the penguins sex, age, social status within a group and emotional state.

=== Agonistic calls ===
Agonistic calls are vocalizations used when a banded penguin is demonstrating agonistic behaviour, which is characterized by aggressive interactions or fighting. Typically, banded penguins vocalize agonistic calls when defending a territory, such as their nest, against conspecifics. For nesting penguin species, such as banded penguins, the mating pair and their offspring are the only individuals allowed on their nest. Thus, any conspecific from the large colony that intrudes this territory will be a threat and an agonistic call will be produced.

=== Display songs ===
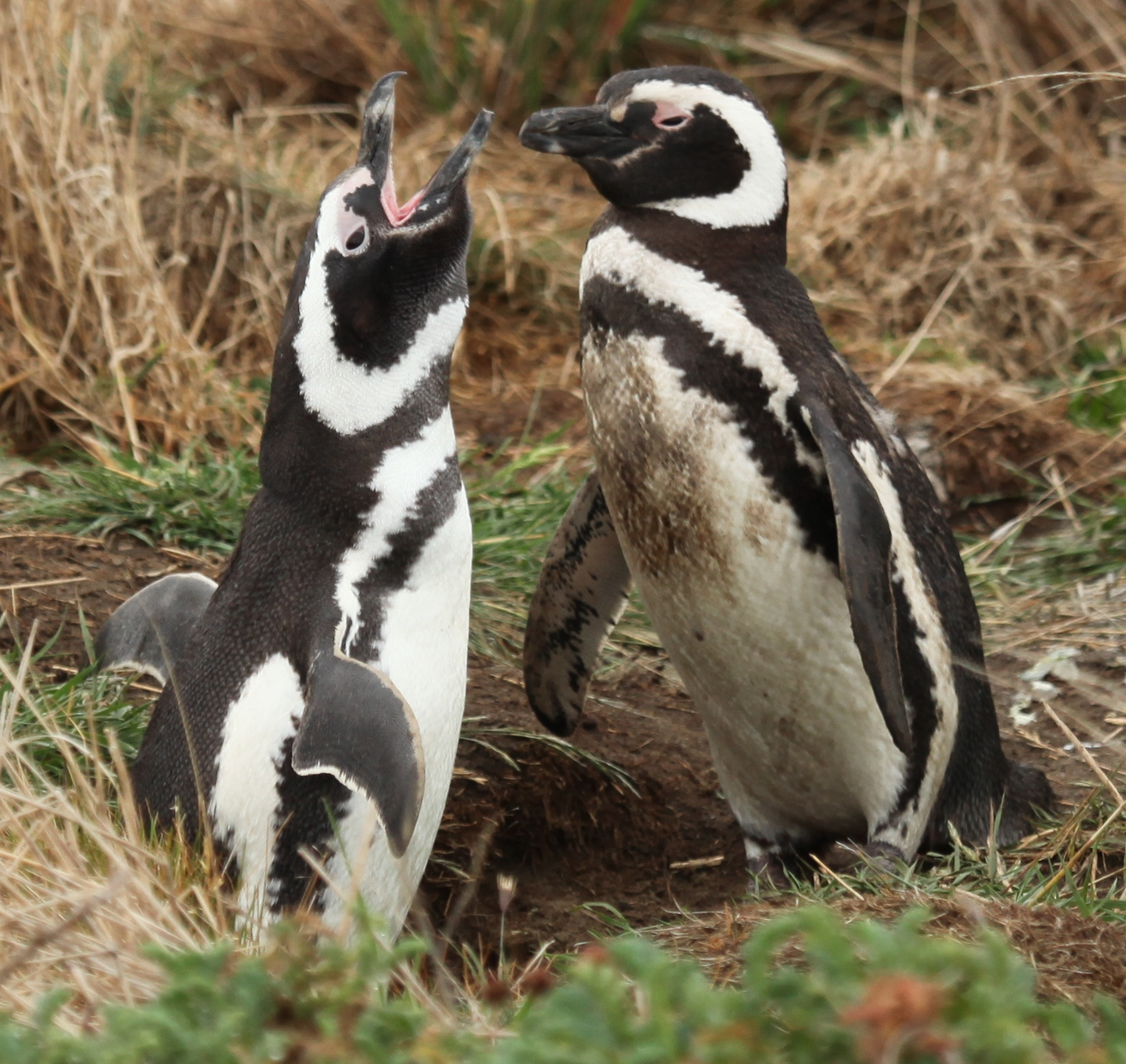
A pair of Magellanic penguins, with one performing a display song

There are two types of display songs vocalized by banded penguins; ecstatic display songs and mutual display songs. Ecstatic display songs are the loudest and most complex vocalization performed by banded penguins. They are composed of a sequence of distinct acoustic syllables that combine to form a complete phrase and are often displayed during their breeding season. Despite the close relatedness of banded penguin species, the ecstatic display calls of African, Humboldt and Magellanic penguins are distinctly recognizable, even to human listeners. Typically, females respond more strongly to ecstatic display calls from their mates than from other conspecifics. Furthermore, there is evidence to suggest that ecstatic display songs may convey vocal individuality through the type of syllables the song produces. This vocal individuality can convey information such as body size and weight, since heavier penguins typically emit longer and lower-pitched vocalizations. Mutual display songs are similar to ecstatic display songs in that they are also complex sequences of acoustic syllables. However, mutual display songs are performed by mates at their nesting site.

== Source-filter theory ==
The source-filter theory is a framework used for studying the communication of mammalian animals through vocalizations. According to this theory, acoustic calls are produced by a source and then must be filtered to remove certain frequencies or leave others unchanged, which produces vocal individuality. In mammals, the source is the vibrations in the larynx and the filter is the super laryngeal vocal tract. However, birds use a different source and filter to produce vocalizations. They use a structure called the syrinx as their source of vibrations and their trachea acts as the filter. The source-filter theory has become increasingly popular to study birds, such as various species of banded penguins. This theory can be used to investigate how acoustic variation and individuality within a set of closely related species is attributed to distinct morphological differences in their vocal organs. The equivalence of the source-filter theory in humans is the source–filter model of speech production.
