= Pseudaptenodytes =

Pseudaptenodytes Temporal range: Late Miocene–Early Pliocene

Scientific classification
- Kingdom: Animalia
- Phylum: Chordata
- Class: Aves
- Order: Sphenisciformes
- Family: Spheniscidae
- Genus: †Pseudaptenodytes; Simpson, 1970

Species
- Pseudaptenodytes macraei (type); Pseudaptenodytes minor (disputed)

Extinct genus of birds

The extinct penguin genus Pseudaptenodytes contains the type species P. macraei; smaller bones have been assigned to P. minor, although it is not certain whether they are really from a different species or simply of younger individuals; both taxa are known by an insufficient selection of bones. The fossils of Pseudaptenodytes have been found in deposits in Victoria (Australia) which are of Late Miocene or Early Pliocene age.
