= Delclosia =

Delclosia Temporal range: Berriasian-Valanginian

Scientific classification
- Domain: Eukaryota
- Kingdom: Animalia
- Phylum: Arthropoda
- Class: Malacostraca
- Order: Decapoda
- Suborder: Pleocyemata
- Infraorder: Caridea
- Family: Atyidae
- Genus: †Delclosia; Rabadà, 1993

Species
- Delclosia martinelli Rabadà, 1993; Delclosia roselli (Via, 1971)

Extinct genus of crustaceans

Delclosia is an extinct genus of shrimp in the order Decapoda, containing two species.
