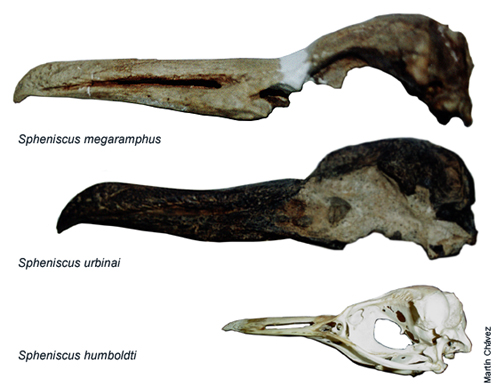
- Skull of Spheniscus megaramphus (top) compared with those of S. urbinai (middle) and S. humboldti (bottom)

Scientific classification
- Kingdom: Animalia
- Phylum: Chordata
- Class: Aves
- Order: Sphenisciformes
- Family: Spheniscidae
- Genus: Spheniscus
- Species: S. megaramphus

Binomial name
- Spheniscus megaramphus Stucchi, 2003

= Spheniscus megaramphus =

Spheniscus megaramphus Temporal range: Late Miocene

Extinct species of bird

Spheniscus megaramphus (from Greek; megas, 'large', and ramphos, 'beak') is an extinct species of penguin that lived during the Late Miocene (present Peru) South America. It is notable for being the largest known species of banded penguin, along with having a proportionally large beak.

== Taxonomy ==
The species was described in 2003 by Marcelo Stucchi based on fossils found in the fossiliferous Pisco Formation of the Pisco Basin, southwestern Peru.

At about one metre (3 ft) in height, Spheniscus megaramphus was significantly larger and more robust than any living banded penguin. The beak of S. megaramphus is also proportionally much larger compared to extant banded penguins; the beak of S. megaramphus exceeds the length of its cranium, whereas the Humboldt penguin's beak and cranium are roughly equal in length.

S. megaramphus is one of many extinct penguin species found in the Pisco Formation, along with other extinct banded penguins such as S. muizoni and S. urbinai, the latter of which is similar in size to S. megaramphus.

== Paleobiology ==
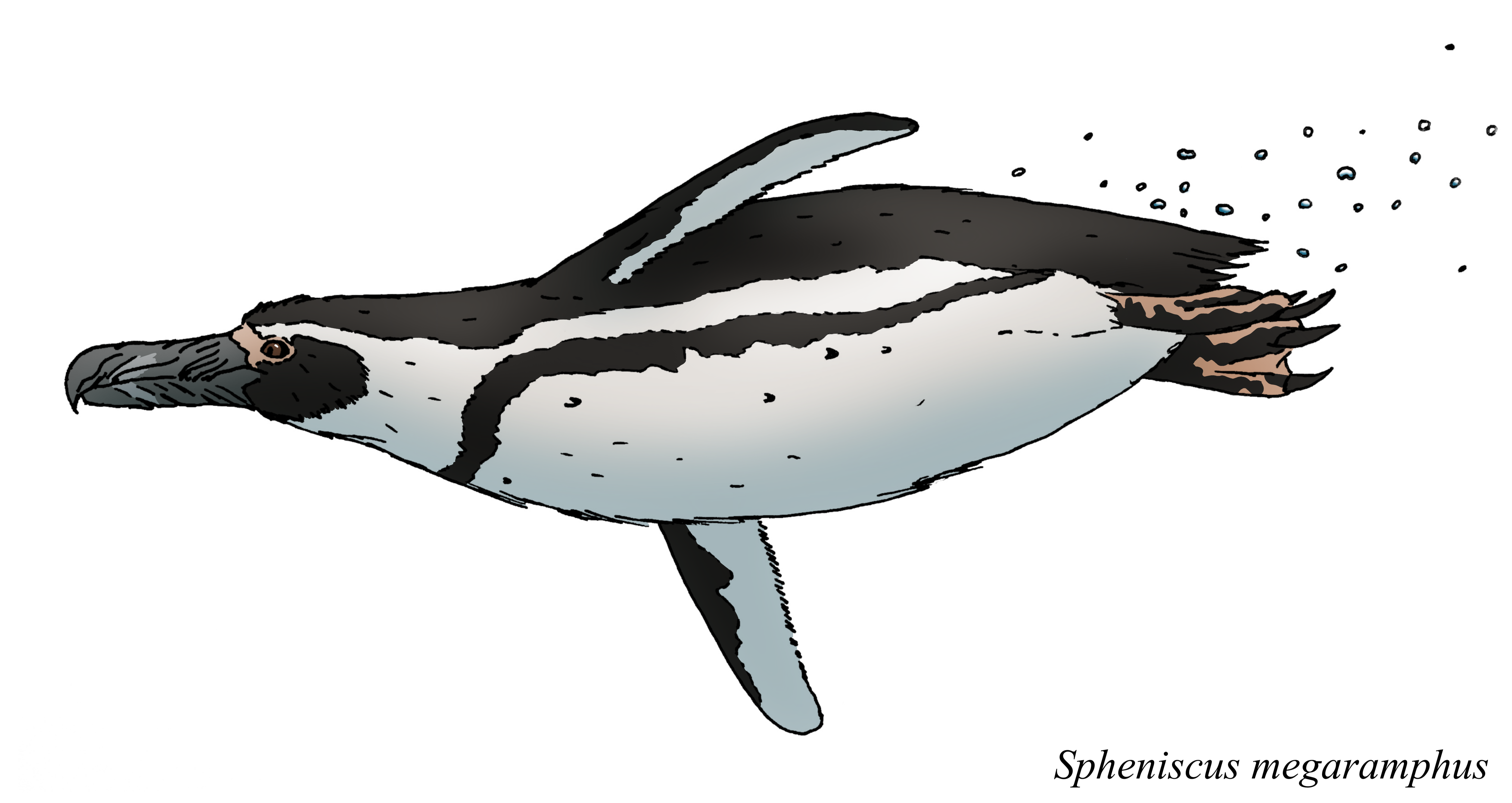
Life reconstruction

The shape and size of S. megaramphus' beak would have allowed the species to hunt relatively large prey. As with living banded penguins, S. megaramphus obtained water from the fish and squid it ate, with excess sea salt being filtered out of the body via a salt gland. S. megaramphus had comparatively large salt glands, an adaptation that suggests the species spent much of its life out at sea.
