= Pygoscelis tyreei =

Pygoscelis tyreei Temporal range: Late Pliocene

Scientific classification
- Kingdom: Animalia
- Phylum: Chordata
- Class: Aves
- Order: Sphenisciformes
- Family: Spheniscidae
- Genus: Pygoscelis
- Species: P. tyreei

Binomial name
- Pygoscelis tyreei Simpson, 1972

Extinct species of bird

Pygoscelis tyreei, also referred to as Tyree's penguin, is an extinct species of penguin from New Zealand. It was slightly smaller than the extant gentoo penguin, standing 70 to 80 cm high. Of Late Pliocene age, it is known only from fossil remains collected from Motunau Beach, North Canterbury.
