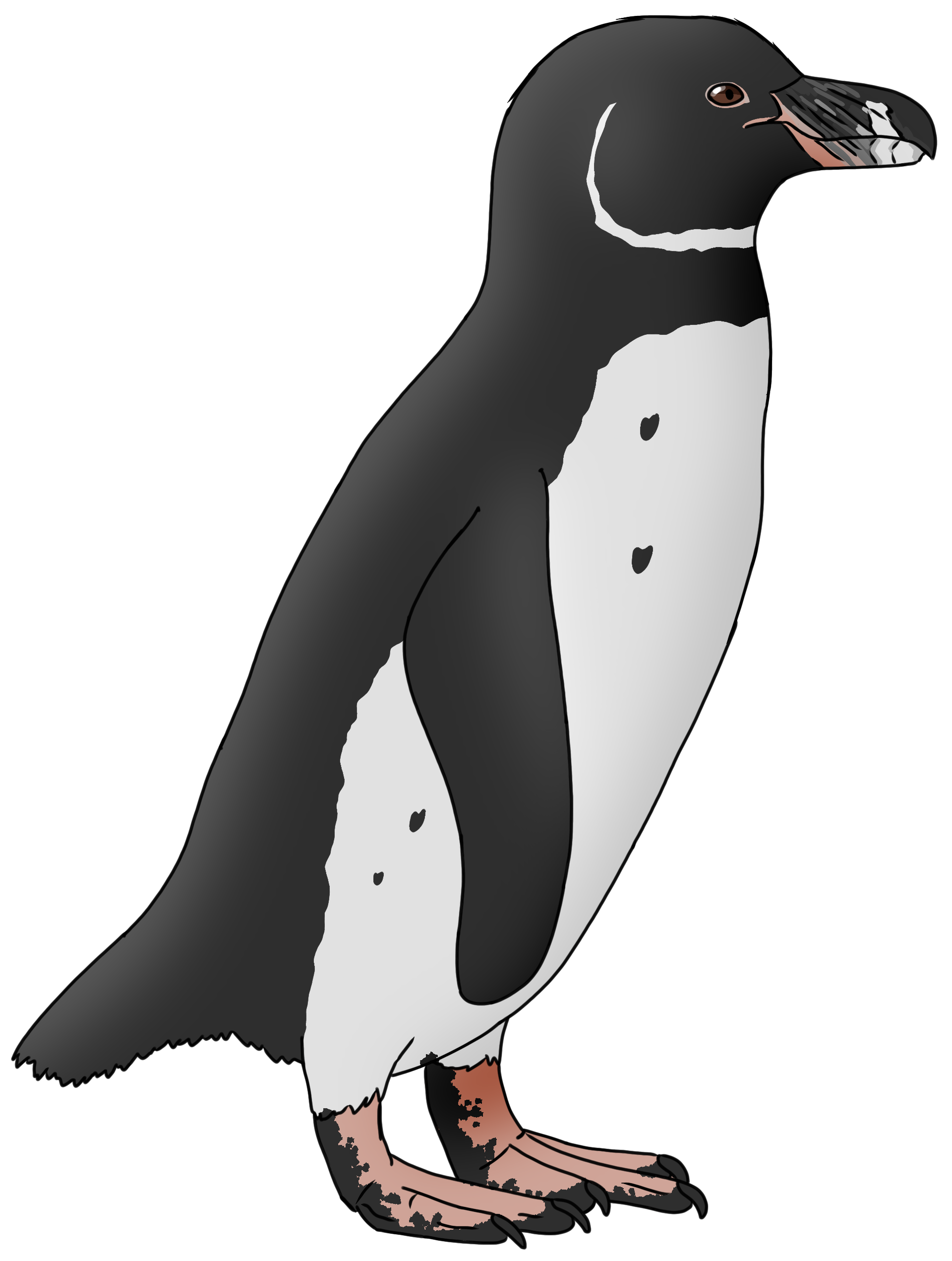
- Artistic reconstruction of Spheniscus muizoni

Scientific classification
- Domain: Eukaryota
- Kingdom: Animalia
- Phylum: Chordata
- Class: Aves
- Order: Sphenisciformes
- Family: Spheniscidae
- Genus: Spheniscus
- Species: S. muizoni

Binomial name
- Spheniscus muizoni Göhlich 2007

= Spheniscus muizoni =

Spheniscus muizoni Temporal range: Serravallian (Laventan) ~13–11 Ma

Extinct species of bird

Spheniscus muizoni is an extinct species of banded penguins that lived during the early Late Miocene in what is now Peru, South America. The species, the earliest member of the extant genus, was described in 2007 by Ursula B. Göhlich based on fossils found in the fossiliferous Pisco Formation of the Pisco Basin, southwestern Peru.

== Discovery and naming ==
Fossils of Spheniscus muizoni were found by French paleontologist Christian de Muizon in sediments belonging to the Pisco Formation at the locality Cerro la Bruja in the middle of the Pisco Basin. The material is owned by the Muséum National d'Histoire Naturelle in Paris. The species epithet was chosen in honour of De Muizon, who has greatly contributed to the faunal descriptions of the Pisco Formation and other areas in Peru.

== Description ==
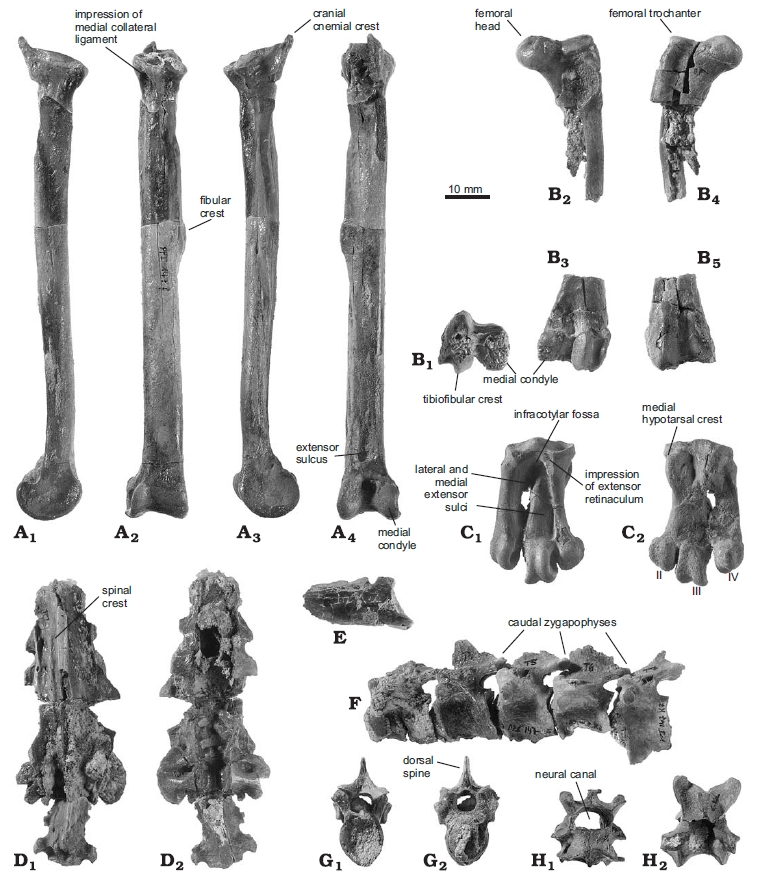
Fossils of Spheniscus muizoni

The holotype material consists of a partial postcranial skeleton, subcomplete left and right coracoid, subcomplete right scapula, a subcomplete left and right humerus, the left complete ulna, proximal and distal end of the right femur, the complete right and proximal end of the left tibiotarsus, the proximal end of the left fibula, the right complete tarsometatarsus, the cranial portion of the sternum with articular sulcus for coracoid and fragment of the craniolateral process, two fragmentary thoracic vertebrae from the caudal region, seven caudal vertebrae and a fragmentary synsacrum.

Paratype fossils of the species consist of isolated bones; a distal fragmentary half of left coracoid, the right subcomplete coracoid, a left complete ulna, left complete radius, right complete carpometacarpus, the distal end of a right femur, the cranial end of pygostyle and a rib fragment without ends.

The body mass of the penguin species has been estimated to 3,500 to 3,800 grams (7.7 to 8.4 lb), making it smaller than the Magellanic penguin at 4,500 grams (9.9 lb) and distinctly smaller than the Humboldt penguin, but larger than the Galapagos penguin, which has a body mass of 2,500 grams (5.5 lb).

Detailed comparisons with extant and fossil species of Spheniscus suggest that the available postcranial bones of S. muizoni morphologically correspond best with those of Spheniscus urbinai from the same formation, aside from that the latter is distinctly larger. Based on the morphological similarity of Spheniscus muizoni S. urbinai and their stratigraphical succession within the Pisco Formation, it can be supposed that the first gave directly rise at least to the latter.S. muizoni is the only known penguin species from the Cerro la Bruja locality and is unknown from any older or younger deposit in or outside the Pisco Formation. Spheniscus muizoni is not only the oldest penguin species in the Pisco Formation, but also representing the stratigraphically oldest record for the extant genus Spheniscus in general.

== Paleoecology ==
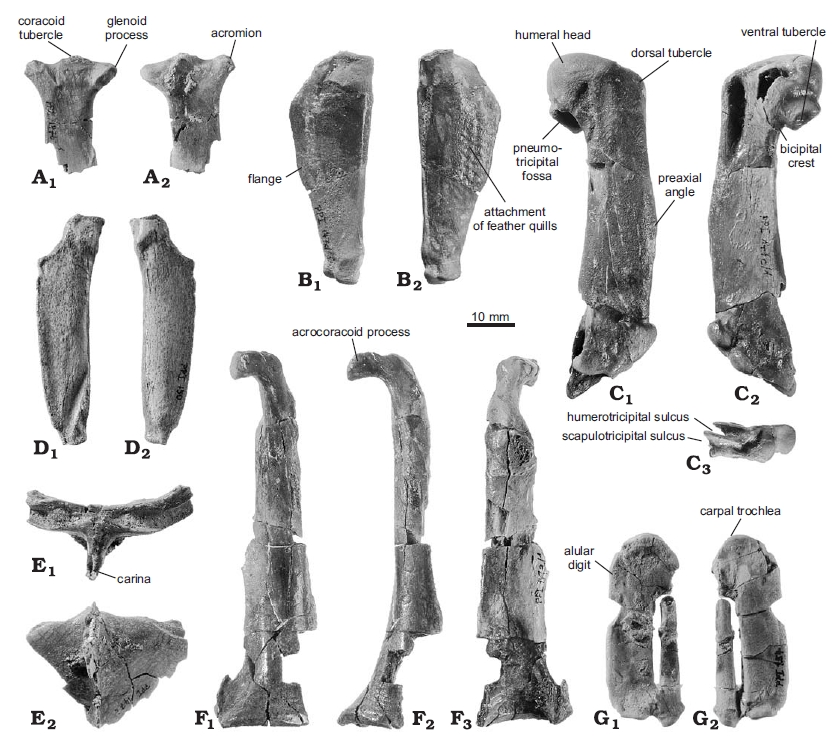
Fossils of Spheniscus muizoni

The Pisco Formation has a long age range, from about 15 Ma (Middle Miocene; Colloncuran) to approximately 2 Ma (Early Pleistocene; Uquian in the SALMA classification). The formation at the Cerro la Bruja paleontological site is characterized by tuffaceous sandstones, siltstones and diatomaceous siltstones with a basal conglomerate. Hardgrounds are present at the location. The depositional environment of the Pisco Formation at this locality is interpreted as a shallow to deeper shelf setting.

The fossil record indicates a faunal change of Spheniscus species within the stratigraphically older sequence of the Pisco Formation. While Spheniscus megaramphus is found at the Late Miocene Montemar Norte location, and Spheniscus humboldti is recovered from the Early Pleistocene Yauca locality, S. muizoni occurs exclusively in the oldest deposits (latest middle/earliest late Miocene, 13–11 Ma; Serravallian, or Laventan SALMA) and was probably replaced by the persistent S. urbinai, which is found in strata dating from the Late Miocene to the Early Pliocene (9 to 3.5 Ma).

The formation in other, mostly younger, locations has provided an exceptionally rich faunal assemblage of toothed whales, baleen whales, dolphins, seals, swimming sloths (Thalassocnus), and other birds (among which other Spheniscus penguins).

At Cerro la Bruja, fossils of rays (Myliobatis sp.), sharks (among which megalodon), other birds (Pelagornis), bony fish (Triglidae, Xiphiidae and Alosinae), and the cetaceans Acrophyseter robustus, Atocetus iquensis, Brachydelphis mazeasi, and Belonodelphis peruanus were found.

In all extant Spheniscus species pelagic school fish (mostly anchovies) is the dominant prey; cephalopods and crustaceans are subordinate. Because the skull of Spheniscus muizoni is lacking, no information is available on the shape of the bill, which varies at least in some extant penguin genera and their preferred diet.
