= Marplesornis =

Marplesornis Temporal range: Early Miocene–Pliocene

Scientific classification
- Domain: Eukaryota
- Kingdom: Animalia
- Phylum: Chordata
- Class: Aves
- Order: Sphenisciformes
- Family: Spheniscidae
- Genus: †Marplesornis; Simpson, 1972
- Species: †M. novaezealandiae

Binomial name
- †Marplesornis novaezealandiae (Marples, 1960), Simpson, 1972

Synonyms
- Paleospheniscus novaezealandiae Marples, 1960

Extinct genus of birds

Marplesornis novaezealandiae, also referred to as Harris's penguin, is a genus and species of extinct penguin from New Zealand. It was a relatively large penguin, about the same size as a king penguin. The age of the only known specimen is uncertain, being often mentioned as Late Pliocene in age. However, due to the complex geology of the collection site, its actual age is somewhere between Early Miocene and Late Pliocene.

== History ==
The penguin was described by Brian Marples from fossil material (a fairly complete skeleton) collected by G. Harris in 1955 from Motunau Beach in the Canterbury region of the South Island. Marples placed it in Paleospheniscus, a genus known from Argentina. It was subsequently moved by George Gaylord Simpson to the new, monotypic genus Marplesornis, named to honour the original describer. The specific epithet is a Latinisation of "New Zealand". The common name recognises the discoverer of the type material.
