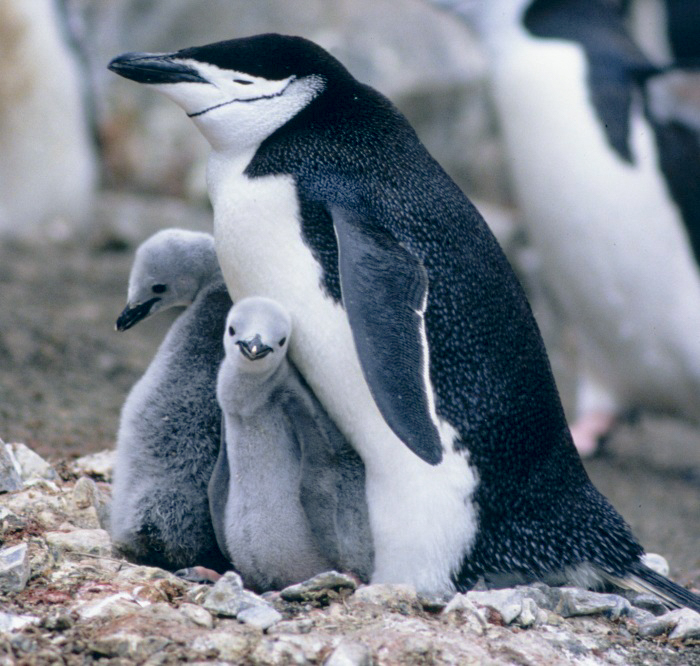
- Chinstrap penguin (Pygoscelis antarcticus)

Scientific classification
- Kingdom: Animalia
- Phylum: Chordata
- Class: Aves
- Order: Sphenisciformes
- Family: Spheniscidae
- Genus: Pygoscelis; Wagler, 1832

Type species
- Aptenodytes antarctica

Species
- Pygoscelis adeliae Pygoscelis antarcticus Pygoscelis kerguelensis Pygoscelis papua †Pygoscelis tyreei (fossil) †Pygoscelis calderensis (fossil) †Pygoscelis grandis (fossil)

= Pygoscelis =

Brush-tailed penguins Temporal range: Eocene to present

Genus of birds

The genus Pygoscelis ("rump-legged") contains four living species of penguins collectively known as "brush-tailed penguins".

== Taxonomy ==
Mitochondrial and nuclear DNA evidence suggests the genus split from other penguins around 38 million years ago, about 2 million years after the ancestors of the genus Aptenodytes. In turn, the Adelie penguins split off from the other members of the genus around 19 million years ago.

Extant species

Genus Pygoscelis – Wagler, 1832 – four species
Common name	Scientific name and subspecies	Range	Size and ecology	IUCN status and estimated population
Adélie penguin	Pygoscelis adeliae (Hombron & Jacquinot, 1841)	Antarctica, Bouvet Island	Size: 70–73 cm (28–29 in) in length and a weight of 3.8 to 8.2 kg (8.4 to 18.1 lb). Habitat: Diet:	LC
Chinstrap penguin	Pygoscelis antarcticus (Forster, 1781)	Antarctica, Argentina, Bouvet Island, Chile, the Falkland Islands, the French Southern Territories, and South Georgia and the South Sandwich Islands	Size: 68–76 cm (27–30 in) in length and a weight of 3.2–5.3 kg (7.1–11.7 lb) Habitat: Diet:	LC
Gentoo penguin	Pygoscelis papua (Forster, 1781) Four subspecies: P. p. taeniata (Peale, 1849); P. p. papua (Forster, 1781); P. p. ellsworthi (Murphy, 1947); P. p. poncetii (Tyler, Bonfitto, Clucas, Reddy & Younger, 2020)	Falkland Islands, South Georgia and the South Sandwich Islands, and Kerguelen Islands	Size: 70–90 cm (28–35 in), with weight of 4.5–8.5 kg (9.9–18.7 lb) Habitat: Diet:	LC
Southeastern gentoo penguin	Pygoscelis kerguelensis (Noll, 2026)	Kerguelen Islands and Heard Island	Size: 51–91 cm (20–36 in) in length and a weight of 4.5–8.5 kg (9.9–18.7 lb) Habitat: Diet:	

A 2020 study found that the gentoo penguin may actually comprise a species complex of 4 similar but genetically distinct species: the northern gentoo penguin (P. papua), the southern gentoo penguin (P. ellsworthi), the eastern gentoo penguin (P. taeniata), and the newly-described South Georgia gentoo penguin (P. poncetii). However, in 2021 the International Ornithological Congress recognized these as being subspecies of P. papua.

A 2026 study, based on the genome sequencing of ten colonies proposes recognizing four species within Pygoscelis papua:

- Pygoscelis papua in the Falkland Islands and South America;
- Pygoscelis taeniata in several groups of subantarctic islands:
  - P. t. taeniata on Macquarie Island;
  - another undescribed subspecies on the Crozet Islands and Marion Island;
- Pygoscelis ellsworthi with two subspecies:
  - P. e. ellsworthi on the Antarctic Peninsula, the South Orkney Islands, and the South Shetland Islands;
  - P. e. poncetii on South Georgia;
- Pygoscelis kerguelensis on the Kerguelen Islands and Heard Island.

Fossil species

- †Pygoscelis grandis (Bahía Inglesa Formation, Late Miocene/Early Pliocene of Bahía Inglesa, Chile)
- †Pygoscelis calderensis (Bahía Inglesa Formation, Late Miocene of Bahía Inglesa, Chile)
- †Pygoscelis tyreei (Pliocene of New Zealand)

The latter two are tentatively assigned to this genus.

== Ecology ==
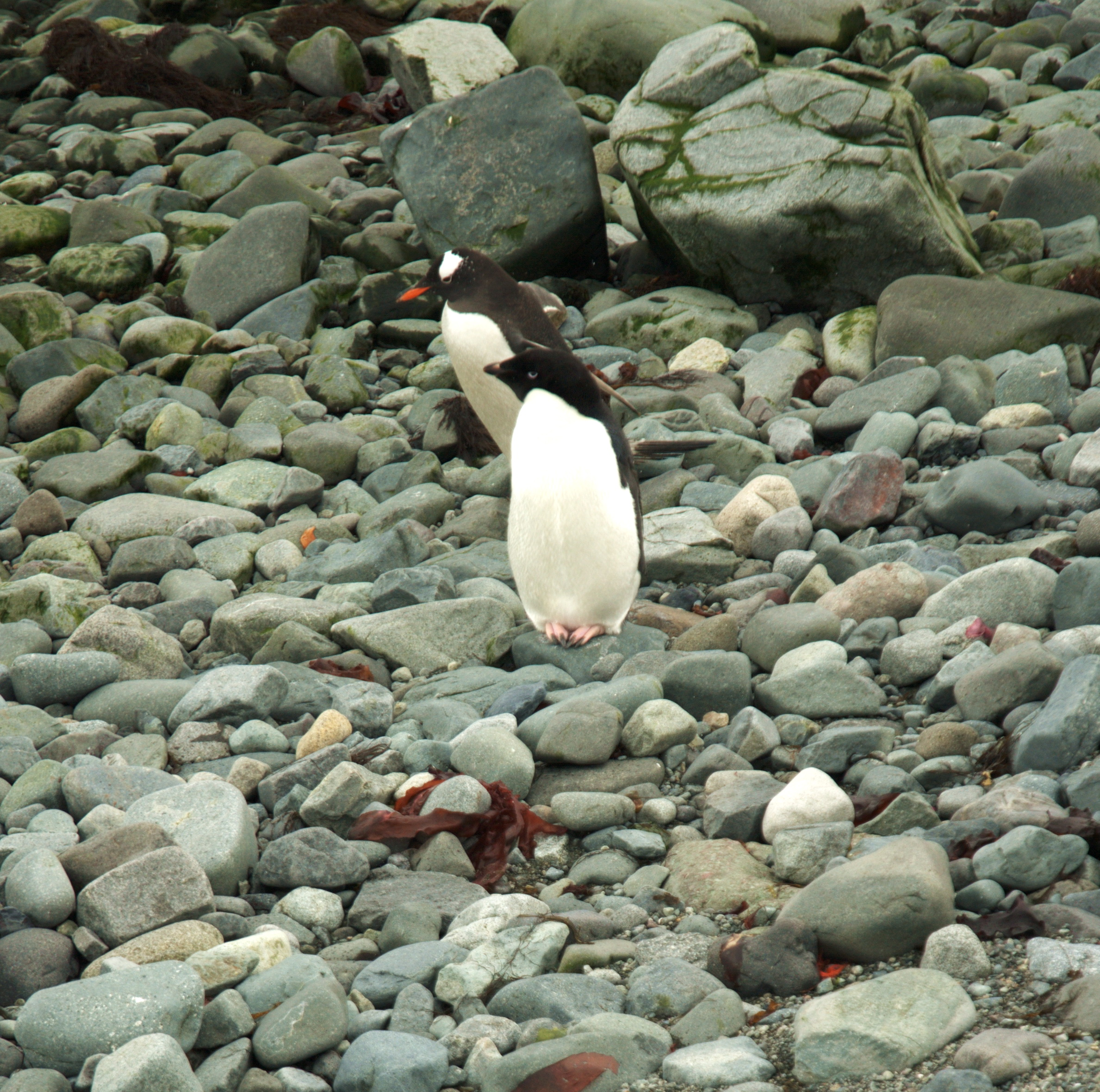
Adelie (front) and gentoo (back), near the Weddell Sea

A study has estimated that there are about 8 million pairs of chinstrap, 3.79 million pairs of Adélie, and 387,000 pairs of gentoo penguins in their particular areas, making up 90% of Antarctic avian biomass.

=== Niche partitioning ===
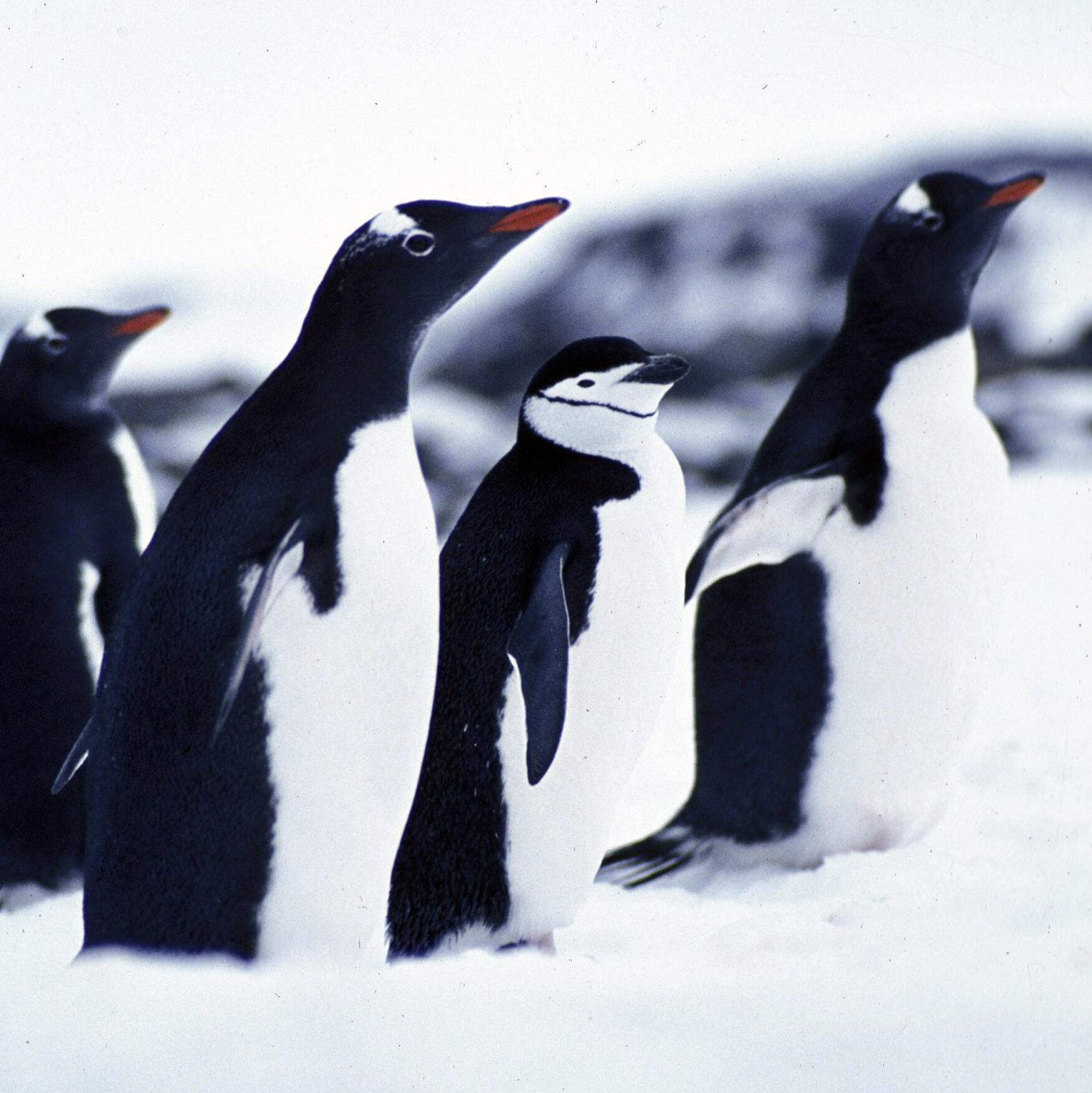
A chinstrap amidst gentoos, at King George Island

While the three species in this genus overlap in range, Adelies can breed further south in the continental Antarctic, gentoos further north, and chinstraps intermediate between the two. Gentoos and chinstraps are less ice-tolerant than Adelies; consequentially, warming climates are causing the range of gentoos and chinstraps to expand southward and the range of Adelies to shrink.

Although all species feed almost entirely on Antarctic krill, there is niche partitioning between species. Gentoos forage closest to shore and often dive much deeper to forage than Adelies and chinstraps. Adelies forage furthest from shore. Gentoos are also more willing to forage on fish, perhaps due to their deeper dives which expose them to bottom-dwelling fish. Unlike their congeners, gentoos can dive as deep as the deepest krill swarms, allowing them to feed on any swarm they locate.

Gentoo chicks take much longer to mature and grow much slower than chinstraps and Adelies, and require twice as much food to mature than either congener. Gentoo parents return much more frequently to feed chicks than congeners. However, by the time gentoo chicks fledge, they are often heavier than adults, while chinstrap and Adelie fledglings do not approach adult weight. The three species also begin breeding at different times. Where the three species overlap, only Adelie chicks migrate to pack ice when fledging, where they spend up to 5 years exploiting the pack ice zone's richer krill supply.
