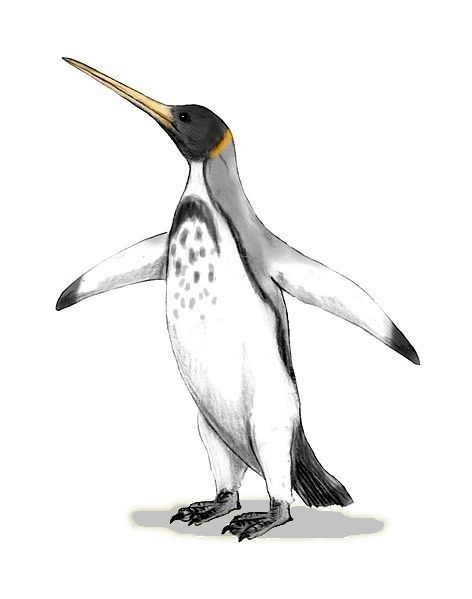
- Icadyptes salasi

Scientific classification
- Kingdom: Animalia
- Phylum: Chordata
- Class: Aves
- Order: Sphenisciformes
- Family: Spheniscidae
- Genus: †Icadyptes
- Species: †I. salasi

Binomial name
- †Icadyptes salasi Clarke et al., 2007

= Icadyptes =

Icadyptes Temporal range: Late Eocene (Divisaderan-Tinguirirican) 37.2–33.9 Ma

Extinct genus of birds

Icadyptes is an extinct genus of giant penguins from the Late Eocene tropics of South America.

== Etymology ==
The genus name is a combination of "Ica" for the Peruvian region where the type species was found and "dyptes" from the Greek word for diver. The species epithet "salasi" refers to Rodolfo Salas Gismondi, a noted Peruvian paleontologist.

== Description ==
Comparing its humerus length to previously estimated standing height of Anthropornis (1.66–1.99 metres (5.4–6.5 ft)) and Palaeeudyptes (1.47–1.75 metres (4.8–5.7 ft)), standing height of Icadyptes is estimated at 1.5 metres (4.9 ft). However, according to original research including data of "standing height" of these two taxa that referred in description are actually showing body length (length between tip of beak and tip of tail, see bird measurement), not standing height. Body length and standing height of penguins are often confused even in scientific reports.

It had an exceptionally long spear-like beak resembling that of a heron. The researchers who discovered the penguins believe the long, pointed beaks are the likely ancestral shape for all penguins.

== Discovery ==
The fossilised remains of the penguin, which lived approximately 36 million years ago, were found in the Otuma Formation, in the coastal desert of Peru by the team of North Carolina State University palaeontologist Dr. Julia Clarke, assistant professor of marine, earth, and atmospheric sciences. Its well-preserved Fossil skeleton was found on the southern coast of Peru together with an early Eocene species, Perudyptes devriesi (comparable in size to the living King penguin), and the remains of three other previously undescribed penguin species, all of which seem to have preferred the tropics over colder latitudes.

== Evolution ==
Icadyptes salasi and Perudyptes devriesi appear to have flourished at warmer latitudes at a time when world temperatures were at their warmest over the past 65 million years. Only a few modern-day penguins, such as the African and Galapagos penguins prefer such a balmy climate.

The discovery of the fossils has caused a re-evaluation of penguin evolution and expansion. Previously, scientists believed that penguins evolved near the poles in Antarctica and New Zealand, and moved closer to the equator around 10 million years ago. Since Icadyptes salasi lived in Peru during a period of great warmth, penguins must have adapted to warm climates around 30 million years earlier than previously believed.
