= Kaiika =

Kaiika Temporal range: Early Eocene

Scientific classification
- Kingdom: Animalia
- Phylum: Chordata
- Class: Aves
- Order: Sphenisciformes
- Genus: †Kaiika; Fordyce & Thomas, 2011

Species
- †K. maxwelli Fordyce & Thomas, 2011 (type)

Extinct genus of birds

Kaiika (Māori for "eater of fish") is an extinct genus of basal penguin from Early Eocene (Waipawan-Mangaorapan subage) deposits of South Canterbury, New Zealand. It is known only from a single humerus. It was found in 1998 by Dr Phillip Maxwell, a paleontologist and stratigrapher, from the Kauru Formation of the Canterbury Basin, near the Waihao River. It was first named by Ewan Fordyce and Daniel Thomas in 2011 and the type species is Kaiika maxwelli. Kaiika is one of the oldest penguins known.
