= Korora =

Korora Temporal range: Late Oligocene to Early Miocene, 25.2–21.7 Ma

Scientific classification
- Kingdom: Animalia
- Phylum: Chordata
- Class: Aves
- Order: Sphenisciformes
- Family: Spheniscidae
- Genus: †Korora; Marples, 1952
- Species: †K. oliveri

Binomial name
- †Korora oliveri Marples, 1952

Extinct genus of birds

Korora oliveri, also referred to as Oliver's penguin, is a genus and species of extinct penguin from the Waitakian Stage (Late Oligocene to Early Miocene) of New Zealand. It was relatively small and slender, similar in size to one of the larger crested penguins. The penguin was described by Brian Marples in 1952 from fossil material (a tarsometatarsus) he collected in the Hakataramea Valley, in the Canterbury region of the South Island. The genus name Korora is the Māori term for the extant little penguin. The specific epithet honours Walter Oliver (1883–1957) a former director of the Dominion Museum.
