= Duntroonornis =

Duntroonornis Temporal range: Late Oligocene, 27.3–25.2 Ma

Scientific classification
- Domain: Eukaryota
- Kingdom: Animalia
- Phylum: Chordata
- Class: Aves
- Order: Sphenisciformes
- Family: Spheniscidae
- Genus: †Duntroonornis; Marples, 1952
- Species: †D. parvus

Binomial name
- †Duntroonornis parvus Marples, 1952

Extinct genus of birds

Duntroonornis parvus, also referred to as the Duntroon penguin, is a genus and species of extinct penguin from the Late Oligocene of New Zealand. The penguin was relatively small, similar in size to the Fiordland crested penguin. It was described by Brian Marples in 1952 from fossil material (a left tarsometatarsus) collected near Duntroon, from the Kokoamu Greensand Formation, near the border between the Canterbury and Otago regions of the South Island. Fossils found at the Hakataramea Valley may also be referrable to this species. The genus name Duntroonornis means "Duntroon bird". The specific epithet is the Latin parvus ("small").
