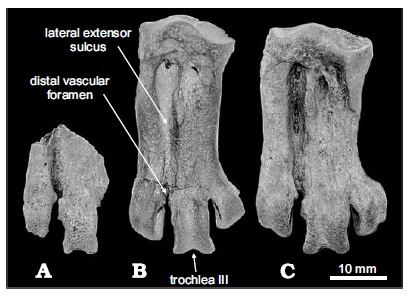
- Partial skeleton of Delphinoris larseni

Scientific classification
- Domain: Eukaryota
- Kingdom: Animalia
- Phylum: Chordata
- Class: Aves
- Order: Sphenisciformes
- Genus: †Delphinornis; Wiman, 1905

Species
- †D. arctowskii; †D. gracilis; †D. larseni

= Delphinornis =

Delphinornis Temporal range: Middle Eocene–Middle Miocene

Extinct genus of penguins

Delphinornis is an extinct genus of penguins that lived around the middle Eocene to the middle Miocene in Antarctica.
