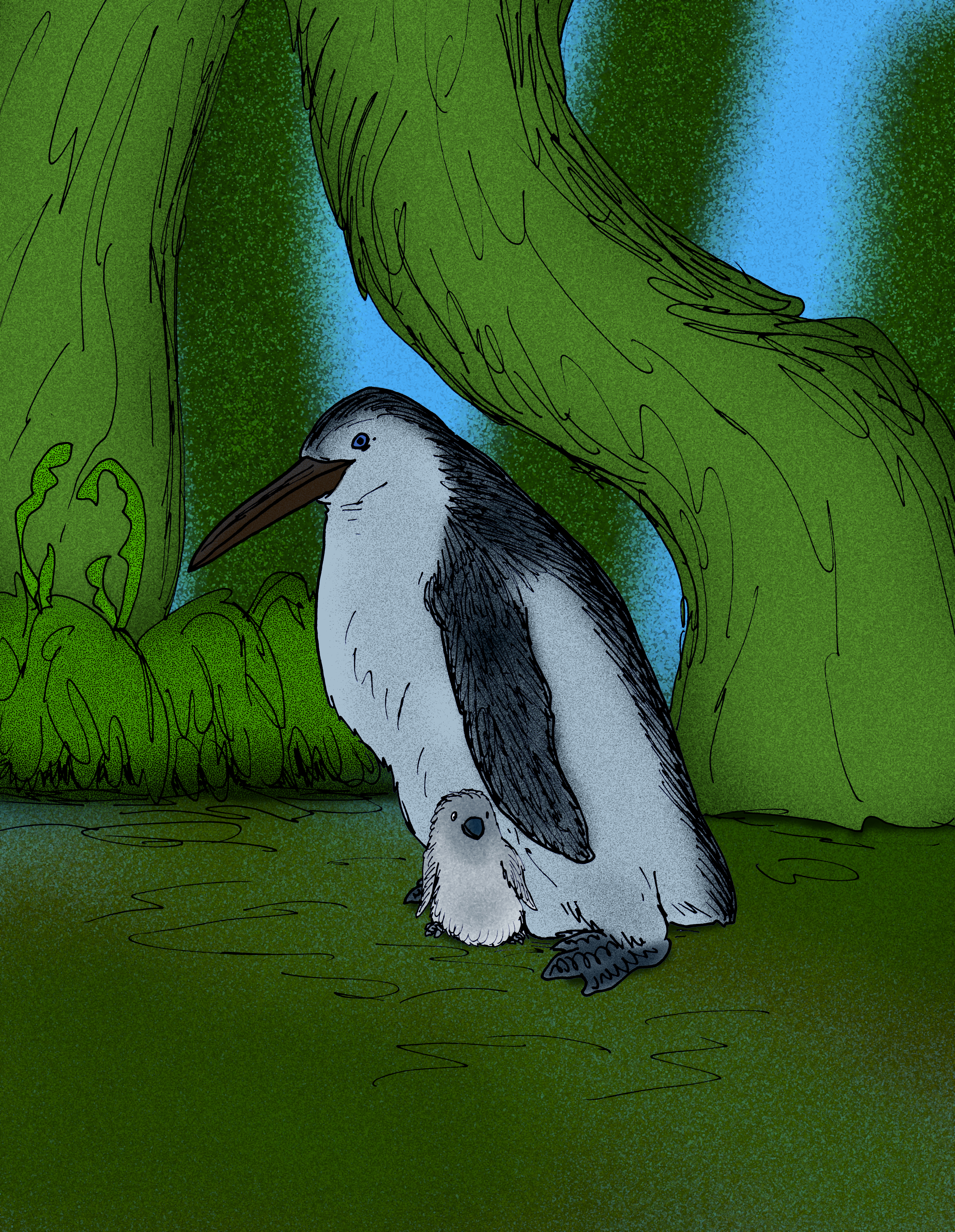
- restoration of C. unienwillia

Scientific classification
- Kingdom: Animalia
- Phylum: Chordata
- Class: Aves
- Order: Sphenisciformes
- Family: Spheniscidae
- Genus: †Crossvallia; Tambussi et al. 2005

Species
- †Crossvallia unienwillia (type) (fossil) †?Crossvallia waiparensis (fossil)

= Crossvallia =

Crossvallia Temporal range: Late Paleocene ~55 Ma

Extinct genus of penguins

Crossvallia is an extinct genus of penguins. It includes two species, C. unienwillia and ?C. waiparensis. Their anatomy suggests that the genus is closely related to the Anthropornithinae.

== Taxonomy ==
Order Sphenisciformes

- Family Spheniscidae
  - Genus Crossvallia †
    - C. unienwillia † Tambussi et al., 2005
    - C. waiparensis † Mayr et al., 2019

C. unienwillia was the first of the genus to be described, whose remains were recovered from and named after the Late Paleocene Cross Valley Formation on Seymour Island, Antarctica. It measured about 140 cm (4.6 ft).

In August 2019, a new species of Crossvallia, C. waiparensis, was described based on leg bone fossils from Waipara, New Zealand. It measured about 160 cm (5.2 ft) and weighed around 70–80 kg, being about 154-176 lb. This is significantly large, considering the largest extant penguin species, the Emperor penguin, can be roughly around 121.9 cm, and weigh up to almost 36 kg. It is thought to have lived in the final of Cretaceous and Paleocene 66–56 million years ago, and close relatives of C. waiparensis may have lived in the Antarctic. The fossils were discovered in 2019 by amateur palaeontologist Leigh Love.
