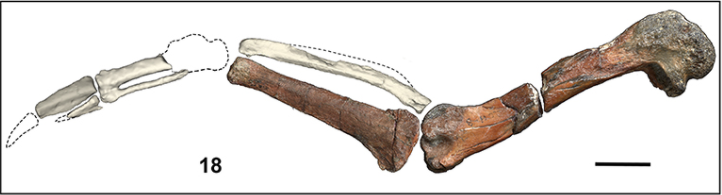
- Left forelimb reconstruction for Kupoupou stilwelli (a composite of multiple specimens), dorsal view

Scientific classification
- Domain: Eukaryota
- Kingdom: Animalia
- Phylum: Chordata
- Class: Aves
- Order: Sphenisciformes
- Genus: †Kupoupou; Blokland et al., 2019
- Species: †K. stilwelli

Binomial name
- †Kupoupou stilwelli Blokland et al., 2019

= Kupoupou =

Kupoupou Temporal range: Paleocene, 62.5–60 Ma

Extinct genus of birds

Kupoupou (meaning "diving bird" in Ta Rē Moriori) is an extinct genus of bird from the Paleocene-aged Takatika Grit of the Chatham Islands, New Zealand which is believed to be the oldest penguin genus known to date. The type species, K. stilwelli, was named and described by Blokland et al. in 2019.

== Discovery and naming ==
Five specimens are known and they were excavated between 2006 and 2011 and the group that excavated the specimens was led by Monash University palaeontologist Jeffrey Stilwell, who is honoured in the epithet of K. stilwelli.

The holotype is NMNZ S.47312; an associated left tarsometatarsus, left radius, and caudal vertebra, and the referred material consists of:

- NMNZ S.44729; a left coracoid.
- NMNZ S.47303; associated partial skeleton comprising a distal right carpometacarpus, left radius, proximal right radius, right proximal phalanx of the second digit, right phalanx of the third digit, an almost complete axis, four cervical vertebrae, a caudal vertebra, a left rib, and a partial worn ilium
- NMNZ S.47308; a right femur, a left humerus, a sternal section of a left coracoid, a left ulna.
- NMNZ S.47339; omal part scapula, distally eroded left humerus, right ulna, right radius, distal left femur, distal left tibiotarsus, two cervical vertebrae and five other vertebrae in differing degrees of preservation and exposure at the rock surface, and two partial ribs.

== Description ==
Blokland et al. (2019) estimated that when fully grown, Kupoupou grew to around 1.1 metres (3.6 ft) tall on average.

Similar to modern penguins, Kupoupou was best suited to an aquatic lifestyle. It was also the first fossil penguin found to be similar in both hind limb and foot shape to modern penguins.

== Classification ==
Blokland et al. placed Kupoupou as the oldest and most basal member of the Sphenisciformes and they also identified that the ancestors of penguins, the Aequornithes (known as core water birds), probably diverged from the lineage leading to their closest living relatives, such as albatrosses (Diomedeidae) and petrels (Procellariiformes), during the Late Cretaceous (early Maastrichtian; around 70 Ma) and then diverged into many different species after the K-Pg mass extinction event happened 66 million years ago.
