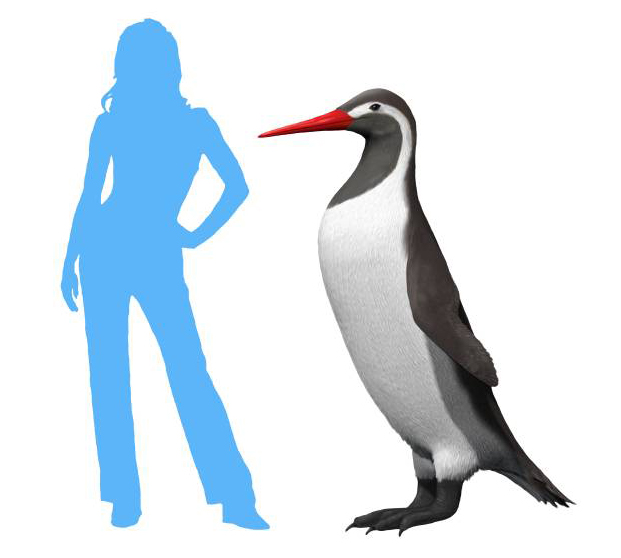
- Life restoration of Kumimanu biceae

Scientific classification
- Kingdom: Animalia
- Phylum: Chordata
- Class: Aves
- Order: Sphenisciformes
- Family: incertae sedis
- Genus: †Kumimanu; Mayr et al., 2017

Type species
- † Kumimanu biceae Mayr et al., 2017

Species
- †K. biceae Mayr et al., 2017; †K. fordycei Ksepka et al., 2023

= Kumimanu =

Kumimanu Temporal range: Paleocene, 56–60 Ma

Extinct genus of birds

Kumimanu is an extinct genus of giant penguin, which lived around 56 to 60 million years ago. The type species is Kumimanu biceae, which arose after the extinction of the non-avian dinosaurs. Fossils were found in New Zealand, and the discovery was announced in December 2017. A second species, Kumimanu fordycei, was named in February 2023, though some researchers consider it synonymous with the type species.

== Discovery and naming ==
The Kumimanu fossil material were found by a group of researchers from the Hampden Beach of Otago, on the South Island of New Zealand. The fossils are from the Paleocene Waipara Greensand. The fossils were studied by a New Zealand and German team, led by Gerald Mayr of the Senckenberg Research Institute and Natural History Museum. He was the lead author of an article on the subject published online in December 2017.

The generic name Kumimanu means "monster bird" in Māori language, while the specific name biceae honours Beatrice ("Bice") A. Tennyson who is the mother of one of the authors, Alan J. D. Tennyson.

Kumimanu fordycei is named based on a large specimen from the late Palaeocene Moeraki Formation, dating to 55.5–59.5 million years ago. It was found by palaeontologist Alan Tennyson in 2017. The species name honours palaeontologist Ewan Fordyce. In their 2025 description and revision of fossil material from the New Zealand Waipara Greensand, Mayr et al. explained that the features used to distinguish K. fordycei from K. biceae fall within the range of variation of a single species in modern penguins and the coeval extinct genus Muriwaimanu. As such, they identified K. fordycei as a junior synonym of K. biceae, which was also supported by identical phylogenetic scorings for both species.

== Description ==
Kumimanu is one of the largest known penguins. K. biceae is estimated to have reached 177 cm (5 ft 10 in) in total length from the tip of the beak to tail, and weighed around 101 kg (223 lb). Its size is surpassed only by Palaeeudyptes, which reached a total length of up to 2 m (6 ft 7 in) and a body mass of 116 kg (256 lb). Kumimanu is older than all other previously found remains of penguins which reached 'giant' sizes, and thus allows scientists to better understand the evolution of penguins' size. Ksepka et al. (2023) described the second proposed species, K. fordycei as being significantly larger, with an estimated weight of 148–159.7 kg (326–352 lb). However, Mayr et al. (2025) claimed this size falls within the range of sizes exhibited by modern penguins.
