= Platydyptes =

Platydyptes Temporal range: Late Oligocene to Early Miocene, 27.3–21.7 Ma

Scientific classification
- Kingdom: Animalia
- Phylum: Chordata
- Class: Aves
- Order: Sphenisciformes
- Family: Spheniscidae
- Subfamily: †Palaeeudyptinae
- Genus: †Platydyptes; Marples, 1952

Species
- Platydyptes amiesi; Platydyptes marplesi; Platydyptes novaezealandiae

Extinct genus of birds

Platydyptes is a genus of extinct penguins from the Late Oligocene to Early Miocene (about 27.3 to 21.7 million years ago) of New Zealand. It was created by Brian Marples in 1952 and contains three relatively large species, all of which were described from the north Otago to south Canterbury region in the South Island. The genus name Platydyptes combines the Greek platys ("broad and flat"), alluding to the shape of the humerus, with dyptes ("diver").

== Species ==
- Platydyptes marplesi Simpson, 1971 – Simpson's penguin. The smallest species, the epithet honours Brian Marples, the common name honours the describer George Gaylord Simpson.
- Platydyptes novaezealandiae (Oliver, 1930); Marples, 1952 – wide-flippered penguin. The epithet is a Latinisation of “New Zealand”.
- Platydyptes amiesi Marples, 1952 – Amies’ penguin. The largest species, it was about the size of a king penguin, though with longer flippers. The epithet and common name honour A.C. Amies, a University of Otago student who collected the first specimen in 1946 and was killed in Malaysia soon afterwards.
