= Anthropornis =

Anthropornis Temporal range: Eocene–Oligocene ~45–33 Ma
- Size comparison of the Anthropornis nordenskjoeldi

Scientific classification
- Domain: Eukaryota
- Kingdom: Animalia
- Phylum: Chordata
- Class: Aves
- Order: Sphenisciformes
- Family: Spheniscidae
- Subfamily: †Palaeeudyptinae
- Genus: †Anthropornis; Wiman, 1905

Species
- A. nordenskjoeldi Wiman, 1905 (type); A. grandis (Wiman, 1905)

Extinct genus of birds

Anthropornis is a genus of giant penguin that lived 45-33 million years ago, during the Late Eocene and the earliest part of the Oligocene.

== Description ==
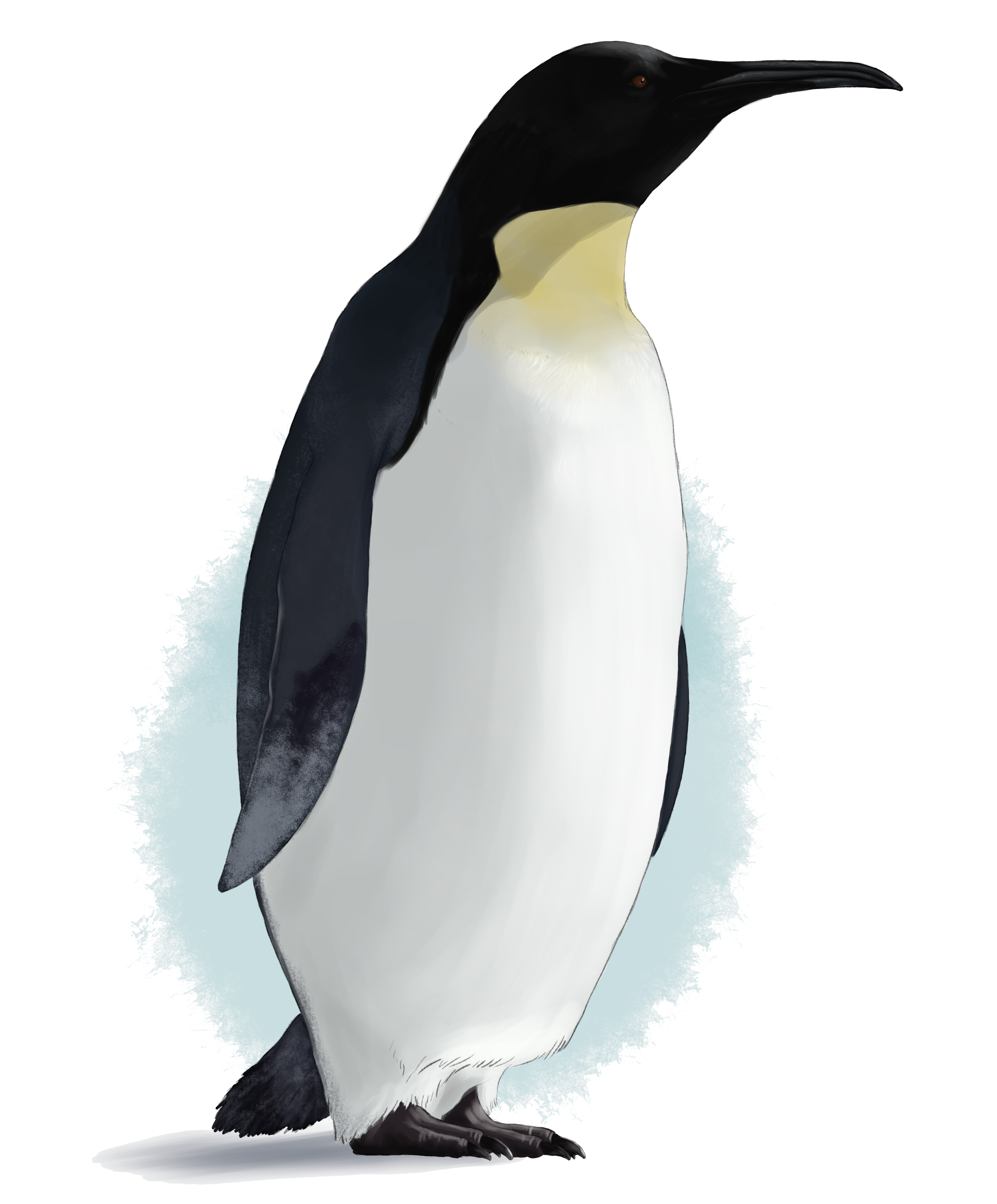
Life restoration of A. grandis

Anthropornis reached 1.8 m (5 ft 11 in) in length from the tip of the beak to the tip of the tail, and 90 kg (200 lb) in weight, making it the largest penguin of the Eocene epoch. There is also an estimate that one specimen of Anthropornis could have reached a body length of 2.05 m (6 ft 9 in) and 108 kg (238 lb) in weight. Fossils of it have been found in the La Meseta Formation on Seymour Island off the coast of Antarctica and in New Zealand. By comparison, the largest modern penguin species, the emperor penguin, is just 1.2 m (3 ft 11 in) long.

The type species, Anthropornis nordenskjoldi, had a bent joint in the wing, probably a vestigial trait from its flying ancestors.
