= Perudyptes =

Perudyptes Temporal range: Mid Eocene (Mustersan) ~42 Ma

Scientific classification
- Kingdom: Animalia
- Phylum: Chordata
- Class: Aves
- Order: Sphenisciformes
- Family: Spheniscidae
- Genus: †Perudyptes; Clarke et al., 2007
- Species: †P. devriesi

Binomial name
- †Perudyptes devriesi Clarke et al., 2007

Extinct species of bird

Perudyptes is a basal penguin from the Middle Eocene Paracas Formation of Peru. The genus name Perudyptes is named after the country, while the species name devriesi Thomas DeVries, a Vashon Island High School science teacher who has long worked in Peru.

== Description ==
Perudyptes devriesi is a basal penguin from the Middle Eocene (Mustersan, ~42 Ma) Paracas Formation of Peru. This new discovery is able to fill a major phylogenetic and stratigraphic (~20 million year) gap between the earliest fossil penguins (Waimanu manneringi and Muriwaimanu tuatahi, ~58–61.6 Ma) and the next oldest partial skeletons.

The skull of Perudyptes is characterized by deep temporal fossae and an elongate, narrow beak that differs from other reported stem penguins in its short mandibular symphysis. The wing skeleton of Perudyptes preserves a combination of plesiomorphic features also observed in the basal penguin Waimanu and derived features shared with more crownward penguins.
