= 2018 in archosaur paleontology =

The year 2018 in archosaur paleontology was eventful. Archosaurs include the only living dinosaur group — birds — and the reptile crocodilians, plus all extinct dinosaurs, extinct crocodilian relatives, and pterosaurs. Archosaur palaeontology is the scientific study of those animals, especially as they existed before the Holocene Epoch began about 11,700 years ago. The year 2018 in paleontology included various significant developments regarding archosaurs.

This article records new taxa of fossil archosaurs of every kind that have been described during the year 2018, as well as other significant discoveries and events related to paleontology of archosaurs that occurred in the year 2018.

== General research ==
- A study on the morphology of dorsal vertebrae of extant and fossil archosaurs, and on its implications for inferring lung structure in non-avian dinosauriform archosaurs, is published by Brocklehurst, Schachner & Sellers (2018).
- A study on the hip joint mobility of the extant common quail, and its implications for inferring the hip joint range of motion in extinct ornithodirans, is published by Manafzadeh & Padian (2018).
- A study on the soft tissue anatomy of the hip joint in non-dinosaurian dinosauromorphs and early dinosaurs is published by Tsai et al. (2018).
- A study on the assembly of the body plan of birds along the whole avian stem-lineage, especially in non-avian dinosaurs, reconstructing the large-scale patterns of the evolution of bird-like traits in bird ancestors, is published by Cau (2018), who names new clades Dracohors and Maniraptoromorpha.
- A study on the histology of limb bones of Anchiornis, Aurornis, Eosinopteryx, Serikornis and Jeholornis, and on the dynamics of skeletal growth in these taxa, is published by Prondvai et al. (2018).
- Discovery of fossilised skin in specimens of Beipiaosaurus, Sinornithosaurus, Microraptor and Confuciusornis from the Early Cretaceous Jehol Biota is reported by McNamara et al. (2018).
- Two theropod bones, preserving shark and crocodyliform feeding traces and invertebrate traces, are described from the Upper Cretaceous (Maastrichtian) Navesink Formation (New Jersey, United States) by Brownstein (2018).
- A study on the relationship between bony and muscular features of the tongue in living archosaurs, and on the evolution of the morphology of the bony elements of the tongue in bird-line archosaurs, is published by Li, Zhou & Clarke (2018).
- An archosaur trackway consisting of 10 successive pes imprints is described from the Upper Triassic Irohalene Member of the Timezgadiouine Formation (Morocco) by Zouheir et al. (2018), supporting a cosmopolitan distribution of pentadactyl but functionally tridactyl chirotheres (Parachirotherium) and grallatorids across the Ladinian-Carnian boundary, and documenting the occurrence of very large Eubrontes trackmakers in the early Carnian.
- A large assemblage of archosaur (dinosaur, pterosaur and crocodylomorph) tracks is described from the Cretaceous Naturita Formation (Utah, United States) by Lockley, Burton & Grondel (2018).
- A study on assemblages of nesting ring-billed gulls, California gulls, American white pelicans and double-crested cormorants at Bowdoin National Wildlife Refuge (Montana, United States), evaluating their utility as taphonomic models for interpreting nesting sites of fossils archosaurs, is published online by Ferguson, Varricchio & Ferguson (2018).

== Pseudosuchians ==
=== Research ===
- A study on the jaw musculature and biomechanics of Venaticosuchus rusconii based on rediscovered cranial materials is published by Von Baczko (2018).
- Three differently sized braincases diagnosable as belonging to Parringtonia gracilis are described from the Triassic Manda Beds of Tanzania by Nesbitt et al. (2018).
- A study on the histology of osteoderms of Late Triassic aetosaurs from South America, including Aetosauroides scagliai, Aetobarbakinoides brasiliensis and Neoaetosauroides engaeus, is published by Cerda, Desojo & Scheyer (2018).
- Description of new skull material of Aetosauroides scagliai from the Santa Maria Supersequence (Brazil) and a study on the phylogenetic relationships of this species is published by Biacchi Brust et al. (2018).
- The first known natural endocast of an aetosaur (Neoaetosauroides engaeus) is described by von Baczko, Taborda & Desojo (2018).
- Redescription of the aetosaur species Calyptosuchus wellesi is published by Parker (2018).
- A study on the anatomy of the skeleton of Coahomasuchus chathamensis and on the phylogenetic relationships of aetosaurs is published by Hoffman, Heckert & Zanno (2018).
- A restudy of the referred material of Stagonolepis robertsoni housed at the Natural History Museum, London, evaluating the utility of this material for examining the phylogenetic relationships of S. robertsoni, is published by Parker (2018).
- Description of the forelimbs of Stagonolepis olenkae and a study on the probable use of the forelimbs by members of this species is published by Dróżdż (2018).
- New information on the bonebed from the Triassic Badong Formation in Sangzhi County (Hunan, China) preserving the majority of the known fossil material of Lotosaurus adentus is published by Hagen et al. (2018), who also reassess the provenance and age of the deposit.
- A study on the anatomy of the best-preserved skeleton of Prestosuchus chiniquensis, as well as on the phylogenetic relationships of this species, is published online by Roberto-Da-Silva et al. (2018).
- A study on the anatomy of the backbone of Poposaurus langstoni is published by Stefanic & Nesbitt (2018).
- A study on the morphology of the secondary palate in shartegosuchids, based on data from a new specimen of Shartegosuchus from the Ulan Malgait Formation (Mongolia), is published by Dollman et al. (2018).
- Description of the braincase and the brain endocast, vasculature, inner ear, and paratympanic pneumatic cavities of Steneosaurus bollensis and Cricosaurus araucanensis is published by Herrera, Leardi & Fernández (2018).
- A skull of a member of the genus Tyrannoneustes is described from the Middle Jurassic (Callovian) of Germany by Waskow, Grzegorczyk & Sander (2018).
- New specimen of Neuquensuchus universitas, providing new information on the skeletal anatomy of members of the species, is described from the Upper Cretaceous (Santonian) Bajo de la Carpa Formation (Argentina) by Lio et al. (2018).
- A redescription of the anatomy of the skull of Notosuchus terrestris is published by Barrios et al. (2018).
- A study on the anatomy of the skull of Morrinhosuchus luziae is published by Iori et al. (2018).
- A study on the anatomic structures and tooth wear related to mastication in Caipirasuchus is published by Iori & Carvalho (2018).
- A study on the taphonomy of the baurusuchid specimens (as well as non-avian theropods and titanosaur sauropod dinosaurs) from the Upper Cretaceous Bauru Group (Brazil) is published by Bandeira et al. (2018), who argue that low diversity of known theropods in the Bauru Group might be caused by preservational biases, and does not conclusively indicate that baurusuchids outcompeted theropods as top predators in this area.
- A study on the evolution of the skull morphology of baurusuchids is published by Godoy et al. (2018).
- New baurusuchid fossils are described from the Upper Cretaceous (Santonian) Bajo de la Carpa Formation (Argentina) by Leardi, Pol & Gasparini (2018).
- A study on the bone microanatomy of Pepesuchus deiseae is published by Sena et al. (2018).
- Neosuchian crocodylomorph fossils are described from the Bathonian Peski locality in the Moscow Region (Russia) by Pashchenko et al. (2018), who note the similarity of Bathonian vertebrate faunas of the Moscow Region, United Kingdom, Western Siberia and Kyrgyzstan, which they interpret as indicative of faunal homogeneity on the territory of Laurasia.
- New fossil remains of Sarcosuchus are described from the Aptian-Albian deposits of the Tataouine Basin (Tunisia) by Dridi (2018).
- A revision of Trematochampsa taqueti and all fossil material assigned to the species is published by Meunier & Larsson (2018).
- Description of pelvic and femoral remains of allodaposuchids from the Upper Cretaceous of the Lo Hueco fossil site (Spain) is published by de Celis, Narváez & Ortega (2018).
- Fossils of a eusuchian crocodyliform are described from the Lower Cretaceous (Aptian) Khok Kruat Formation (Thailand) by Kubo et al. (2018), representing the oldest record of Asian eusuchians reported so far.
- Description of a new skull of Susisuchus anatoceps from the Lower Cretaceous Crato Formation (Brazil), providing new information on the anatomy of this species, and a study on the phylogenetic relationships of Susisuchus is published by Leite & Fortier (2018).
- A study on the taphonomic history of the holotype, paratypes and referred specimens of Isisfordia duncani is published by Syme & Salisbury (2018).
- A study on the phylogenetic relationships of Thoracosaurus, Eothoracosaurus, Eosuchus, Eogavialis and Argochampsa, evaluating whether they were closely related to the gharial, is published by Lee & Yates (2018).
- A study on the length proportion of limb elements in extant and fossil alligatoroid and crocodyloid crocodylians, as well as on the correlation of limb morphology and skull shape in these groups, is published by Iijima, Kubo & Kobayashi (2018).
- New specimen of Bottosaurus harlani is described from the Rowan Fossil Quarry, a Cretaceous–Paleogene locality in Mantua Township (New Jersey, United States) by Cossette & Brochu (2018).
- A reassessment of the anatomy and phylogenetic relationships of Asiatosuchus nanlingensis and Eoalligator chunyii is published by Wu, Li & Wang (2018), who reinstate the latter taxon as a species distinct from the former one.
- Redescription of the holotype specimen of Mourasuchus arendsi from the Urumaco Formation of Venezuela is published online by Cidade et al. (2018).
- A study on the ontogenetic changes of the skull shape in extant caimans and its implications for the validity of the Miocene species Melanosuchus fisheri is published by Foth et al. (2018).
- A study on the histology of long bones of extant yacare caiman and fossil caimans from the Upper Miocene–Pliocene Solimões Formation (Brazil) is published online by Andrade et al. (2018).
- A study on two fossil specimens of caimans from the late Pleistocene and early Holocene of Brazil, attempting to assign the fossils' identity to one of the extant caiman species on the basis of records of their current distribution and paleoclimatic data, is published by Eduardo et al. (2018).
- A fragment of a mandible of a member of the genus Gryposuchus is described from the Miocene (≈18 Ma) Castillo Formation (Venezuela) by Solórzano, Núñez-Flores & Rincón (2018), representing the earliest record of the genus in South America reported so far.
- A revision of the type species of the genus Gryposuchus, G. jessei, is published by Souza et al. (2018).
- A revision of crocodilian fossils and taxa from the Calvert Cliffs (United States) is published by Weems (2018).
- Partial crocodylian skull from the Pleistocene of Taiwan, formerly regarded as lost during World War II, is rediscovered and redescribed by Ito et al. (2018), who assign this specimen to the genus Toyotamaphimeia.
- Fossils of large crocodylians, as well as tortoise fossils with feeding traces on them, are described from the Pleistocene of Aldabra (Seychelles) by Scheyer et al. (2018), who interpret their findings as indicating the occurrence of a predator–prey interaction between crocodylians and giant tortoises on Aldabra during the Late Pleistocene.
- Late Quaternary fossils representing a locally extinct population of the Cuban crocodile (Crocodylus rhombifer) are reported from two underwater caves in the Dominican Republic by Morgan et al. (2018).
- A new large and well-preserved specimen of Prestosuchus chiniquensis is published by Roberto-da-Silva et al. (2018).

=== New taxa ===
Name	Novelty	Status	Authors	Age	Unit	Location	Notes	Images
Aktiogavialis caribesi	Sp. nov	Valid	Salas-Gismondi et al.	Late Miocene	Urumaco Formation	Venezuela		
Anteophthalmosuchus epikrator	Sp. nov	Valid	Ristevski et al.	Early Cretaceous	Wessex Formation	United Kingdom	A goniopholidid.	
Barrosasuchus	Gen. et sp. nov	Valid	Coria et al.	Late Cretaceous (Santonian)	Bajo de la Carpa Formation	Argentina	A peirosaurid crocodyliform. Genus includes new species B. neuquenianus. Announced in 2018; the final version of the article naming it was published in 2019.	
Caipirasuchus mineirus	Sp. nov	Valid	Martinelli et al.	Late Cretaceous	Adamantina Formation	Brazil	A sphagesaurid crocodyliform.	
Dadagavialis	Gen. et sp. nov	Valid	Salas-Gismondi et al.	Early Miocene	Cucaracha Formation	Panama	A gryposuchine gavialoid. Genus includes new species D. gunai.	
Jiangxisuchus	Gen. et sp. nov	Valid	Li, Wu & Rufolo	Late Cretaceous (Maastrichtian)	Nanxiong Formation	China	A member of Orientalosuchina. Genus includes new species J. nankangensis. Announced in 2018; the final version of the article naming it was published in 2019.	
Kinesuchus	Gen. et sp. nov	Valid	Filippi, Barrios & Garrido	Late Cretaceous (Santonian)	Bajo de la Carpa Formation	Argentina	A itasuchid crocodyliform. The type species is K. overoi.	
Magyarosuchus	Gen. et sp. nov	Valid	Ősi et al.	Early Jurassic (Toarcian)	Kisgerecse Marl Formation	Hungary	A member of Metriorhynchoidea. The type species is M. fitosi.	
Maledictosuchus nuyivijanan	Sp. nov	Valid	Barrientos-Lara, Alvarado-Ortega & Fernández	Late Jurassic (Kimmeridgian)	Sabinal Formation	Mexico		
Mandasuchus	Gen. et sp. nov	Valid	Butler et al.	Triassic	Manda Formation	Tanzania	An early member of Paracrocodylomorpha belonging to the group Loricata. The type species is M. tanyauchen.	
Pagosvenator	Gen. et sp. nov	Valid	Lacerda, de França & Schultz	Middle–Late Triassic	Dinodontosaurus Assemblage Zone of the Santa Maria Supersequence	Brazil	A member of the family Erpetosuchidae. Genus includes new species P. candelariensis.	
Portugalosuchus	Gen. et sp. nov	Valid	Mateus, Puértolas-Pascual & Callapez	Late Cretaceous (Cenomanian)	Tentugal Formation	Portugal	A member of Eusuchia, possibly the oldest known member of Crocodilia. Genus includes new species P. azenhae.	
Protocaiman	Gen. et sp. nov	Valid	Bona et al.	Paleocene (Danian)	Salamanca Formation	Argentina	A relative of caimans. Genus includes new species P. peligrensis.	
Roxochampsa	Gen. et comb. nov	Valid	Piacentini Pinheiro et al.	Late Cretaceous (late Campanian–early Maastrichtian)	Adamantina Formation; Presidente Prudente Formation	Brazil	A crocodyliform belonging to the family Itasuchidae. The type species is "Goniopholis" paulistanus Roxo (1936).	
Theriosuchus morrisonensis	Sp. nov	Valid	Foster	Late Jurassic	Morrison Formation	United States (Wyoming)	A new species of the atoposaurid Theriosuchus and the first known from North America.	
Wahasuchus	Gen. et sp. nov	Valid	Saber et al.	Late Cretaceous (Campanian)	Quseir Formation	Egypt	A member of Mesoeucrocodylia of uncertain phylogenetic placement, possibly a neosuchian. Genus includes new species W. egyptensis.	

== Birds ==
=== Research ===
- Dinosaur-like ossification pattern of skull bones (formation of the ossification centres of the prefrontal and postorbital) is reported in bird embryos by Smith-Paredes et al. (2018).
- A study evaluating whether eggs of early birds from the Mesozoic could have borne the weight of incubating adults is published by Deeming & Mayr (2018).
- A study on the formation of the pygostyle in extant birds and its evolution in Mesozoic birds is published by Rashid et al. (2018), who interpret their findings as indicating that the lack of pygostyle in Zhongornis haoae and other juvenile Mesozoic birds does not necessarily indicate that they are intermediate species in the long- to short-tailed evolutionary transition, and that feathered coelurosaur tail preserved in Burmese amber which was described by Xing et al. (2016) might be avian.
- A study on the anatomy of the braincase of birds and non-avian dinosaurs, evaluating whether there is a link between changes in brain anatomy and loss of flight, is published by Gold & Watanabe (2018).
- A study on the preservation potential of feather keratin in the fossil record is published by Schweitzer et al. (2018); the study is subsequently criticized by Saitta & Vinther (2019).
- Description of 31 samples of Cretaceous amber from Myanmar that contain feathers, providing new information on the morphology and variability of rachis-dominated feathers of Cretaceous birds, is published by Xing et al. (2018).
- A pseudoscorpion attached to barbules of a contour feather, possibly documenting a phoretic association between pseudoscorpions and Mesozoic birds, is described from the Cretaceous amber from Myanmar by Xing, McKellar & Gao (2018).
- A redescription of the bird trackway originally labeled Aquatilavipes anhuiensis from the Lower Cretaceous Qiuzhuang Formation (Anhui, China) is published by Xing et al. (2018), who transfer this ichnospecies to the ichnogenus Koreanaornis.
- Early Cretaceous (Aptian) bird footprints are described from the Kitadani Formation (Japan) by Imai, Tsukiji & Azuma (2018).
- New avian ichnospecies Ignotornis canadensis is described from the Lower Cretaceous (Albian) Gates Formation (Canada) by Buckley, McCrea & Xing (2018).
- Ignotornid tracks are described from the Lower Cretaceous of Jiangsu (China) by Xing et al. (2018), representing the first known record of the ichnogenus Goseongornipes from China.
- The twelfth specimen of Archaeopteryx, the oldest reported so far, is described by Rauhut, Foth & Tischlinger (2018). This was named as the new genus Alcmonavis in 2019.
- A study on the geometric properties of the wing bones of Archaeopteryx is published by Voeten et al. (2018), who interpret their findings as indicating that Archaeopteryx was able to actively use its wings to take to the air (using a different flight stroke than used by extant birds).
- Gastrolith masses preserved in five specimens of Jeholornis will be described by O'Connor et al. (2018).
- A new confuciusornithid specimen, most similar to Eoconfuciusornis zhengi but also sharing traits with Confuciusornis, will be described from the Upper Cretaceous Huajiying Formation (China) by Navalón et al. (2018).
- A study on the morphology of the skull of Confuciusornis sanctus is published by Elżanowski, Peters & Mayr (2018).
- An exceptionally-preserved specimen of Confuciusornis, preserving elaborate plumage patterning, is described from the Lower Cretaceous deposits in Fengning County (Hebei Province, China) estimated to be equivalent with the Dawangzhangzi Member of the Yixian Formation by Li et al. (2018).
- An articulated skeleton of an enantiornithine bird preserved in the Cretaceous amber from Myanmar is described by Xing et al. (2018).
- An early juvenile enantiornithine specimen, providing new information on the osteogenesis in members of Enantiornithes, is described from the Lower Cretaceous Las Hoyas deposits of Spain by Knoll et al. (2018).
- A study evaluating the capacity of the enantiornithines Concornis lacustris and Eoalulavis hoyasi to use intermittent flight (alternating flapping and gliding phases) is published by Serrano et al. (2018).
- A study on the morphology and diversity of enantiornithine coracoids from the Upper Cretaceous Bissekty Formation (Dzharakuduk locality, Uzbekistan) is published by Panteleev (2018).
- O'Connor et al. (2018) propose criteria for identifying medullary bone in fossils, and report probable medullary bone from a pengornithid enantiornithine specimen from the Lower Cretaceous Jiufotang Formation (China).
- A specimen of Archaeorhynchus spathula with extensive soft tissue preservation, revealing a tail morphology previously unknown in Mesozoic birds and an exceptional occurrence of fossilized lung tissue, is described from the Lower Cretaceous Jiufotang Formation (China) by Wang et al. (2018).
- Wang et al. (2018) report the presence of distinct salt gland fossa on the frontal of a bird similar to Iteravis huchzermeyeri and Gansus zheni from the Lower Cretaceous Sihedang locality (Jiufotang Formation, China); the authors also consider I. huchzermeyeri and G. zheni to be probably synonymous.
- Abundant black flies, thought to have inhabited the same environments as Cretaceous ornithurine birds and most likely fed on them, are described from the Santonian Taimyr amber (Russia) by Perkovsky, Sukhomlin & Zelenkov (2018), who use these insects as an indicator of a bird community, and argue that advanced ornithuromorph birds might have originated at higher latitudes.
- Field et al. (2018) report new specimens and previously overlooked elements of the holotype of Ichthyornis dispar, and generate a nearly complete three-dimensional reconstruction of the skull of this species.
- A study on the impact of the widespread destruction of forests during the Cretaceous–Paleogene extinction event on bird evolution, as indicated by ancestral state reconstructions of neornithine ecology and inferences about enantiornithine ecology, is published by Field et al. (2018), who interpret their findings as indicating that the global forest collapse at the end of the Cretaceous caused extinction of predominantly tree-dwelling birds, while bird groups that survived the extinction and gave rise to extant birds were non-arboreal.
- A study on the evolution of the anatomy of the crown-bird skull is published by Felice & Goswami (2018), who also present a hypothetical reconstruction of the ancestral crown-bird skull.
- A fossil tinamou belonging to the genus Eudromia, exceeding the size range of living species of the genus, is described from the Lujanian sediments in Marcos Paz County (Buenos Aires Province, Argentina) by Cenizo et al. (2018).
- A study on the dietary behavior of four species of the moa and their interactions with parasites based on data from their coprolites is published by Boast et al. (2018).
- A study on the seeds preserved in moa coprolites is published by Carpenter et al. (2018), who question the hypothesis that some of the largest-seeded plants of New Zealand were dispersed by moas.
- A study on the genetic and morphological diversity of the emus, including extinct island populations, is published by Thomson et al. (2018).
- A study on the timing of first human arrival in Madagascar, as indicated by evidence of prehistoric human modification of multiple elephant bird postcranial elements, is published by Hansford et al. (2018).
- A study on the anatomy of the brains of elephant birds Aepyornis maximus and A. hildebrandti, and on its implications for inferring the ecology and behaviour of these birds, is published by Torres & Clarke (2018).
- A model of development of bony pseudoteeth of the odontopterygiform birds is proposed by Louchart et al. (2018).
- A study on the phylogenetic relationships of the taxa assigned to the family Vegaviidae by Agnolín et al. (2017) is published by Mayr et al. (2018).
- A study on the adaptations for filter-feeding (other than beak shape) in the feeding apparatus of modern ducks, evaluating whether they could be also found in the skull of Presbyornis, is published by Zelenkov & Stidham (2018), who argue that Presbyornis most likely was a poorly specialized filter-feeder.
- A study on the phylogenetic relationships of the species Chendytes lawi and the Labrador duck (Camptorhynchus labradorius) is published by Buckner et al. (2018).
- Schmidt (2018) interprets more than 1000 large, near-circular gravel mounds from western New South Wales (Australia) as likely to be nest mounds constructed by an extinct bird, similar to the malleefowl but larger.
- A study on the phylogenetic relationships of Foro panarium is published by Field & Hsiang (2018), who consider this species to be a stem-turaco.
- Petralca austriaca, originally thought to be an auk, is reinterpreted as a member of Gaviiformes by Göhlich & Mayr (2018).
- Globuli ossei (subspherical structures of endochondral origin, inserted in the hypertrophic cartilage of long bones) are reported for the first time in a bird (a fossil penguin Delphinornis arctowskii from Antarctica) by Garcia Marsà, Tambussi & Cerda (2018).
- Redescription of the anatomy of the fossil penguin Madrynornis mirandus and a study on the phylogenetic relationships of this species is published by Degrange, Ksepka & Tambussi (2018).
- Fossil material attributed to the extinct Hunter Island penguin (Tasidyptes hunteri) is reinterpreted as assemblage of remains from three extant penguin species by Cole et al. (2018).
- A study on the history of penguin colonization of the Vestfold Hills (Antarctica), indicating that penguins started colonizing the northern Vestfold Hills around 14.6 thousand years before present, is published by Gao et al. (2018).
- A study on the history of active and abandoned Adélie penguin colonies at Cape Adare (Antarctica), based on new excavations and radiocarbon dating, is published by Emslie, McKenzie & Patterson (2018).
- A study on the mummified Adélie penguin carcasses and associated sediments from the Long Peninsula (East Antarctica), and on their implications for inferring the causes of the abandonment of numerous penguin sub-colonies in this area during the 2nd millennium, is published by Gao et al. (2018).
- New bird fossils, including the first reported tarsometatarsus of the plotopterid Tonsala hildegardae are described from the late Eocene/early Oligocene Makah Formation and the Oligocene Pysht Formation (Washington state, United States) by Mayr & Goedert (2018), who name a new plotopterid subfamily Tonsalinae.
- A well-preserved scapula of a plotopterid, enabling the reconstruction of the triosseal canal in plotopterids, is described from the Oligocene Jinnobaru Formation (Japan) by Ando & Fukata (2018).
- Fossil remains of the spectacled cormorant (Phalacrocorax perspicillatus) are described from the upper Pleistocene of Shiriya (northeast Japan) by Watanabe, Matsuoka & Hasegawa (2018).
- Extinct lowland kagu (Rhynochetos orarius) is reinterpreted as synonymous with extant kagu (Rhynochetos jubatus) by Theuerkauf & Gula (2018).
- A study on the phylogenetic relationships of the Rodrigues scops owl and Mauritius scops owl is published by Louchart et al. (2018).
- Fossils of the barn owl (Tyto alba) are described from the Dinaledi Chamber of the Rising Star Cave system (South Africa) by Kruger & Badenhorst (2018), who also evaluate how these bird bones were introduced into the Dinaledi Chamber.
- New fossils of stem-mousebirds belonging to the family Sandcoleidae, providing new information on the anatomy of members of this family, are described from the Eocene of the Messel pit (Germany) by Mayr (2018).
- Partial skeleton of an early member of Coraciiformes of uncertain generic and specific assignment, showing several previously unknown features of the skull and vertebral column of early coraciiforms, is described from the Lower Eocene (53.5–51.5 million years old) London Clay (United Kingdom) by Mayr & Walsh (2018).
- New phorusrhacid fossils are described from the Pleistocene of Uruguay by Jones et al. (2018), providing evidence of survival of phorusrhacids until the end of the Pleistocene.
- A study on the phylogenetic relationships of the extinct Cuban macaw (Ara tricolor) is published by Johansson et al. (2018).
- A study on an ancient DNA of scarlet macaws recovered from archaeological sites in Chaco Canyon and the contemporaneous Mimbres area of New Mexico is published by George et al. (2018), who report low genetic diversity in this sample, and interpret their findings as indicating that people at an undiscovered Pre-Hispanic settlement dating between 900 and 1200 CE managed a macaw breeding colony outside their endemic range.
- A study on the bird fossils from the Olduvai Gorge site (Tanzania) and their implications for inferring the environmental context of the site during the Oldowan-Acheulean transitional period is published by Prassack et al. (2018).
- A study on the bird fossil assemblage from the Pleistocene of the Rio Secco Cave (north-eastern Italy) and its implications for the palaeoenvironmental reconstructions of the site is published by Carrera et al. (2018).
- Oswald & Steadman (2018) report nearly 500 (probably late Pleistocene) bird fossils collected on New Providence (The Bahamas) in 1958 and 1960.
- A study on the fossils of Pleistocene birds collected on Picard Island (Seychelles) in 1987 is published by Hume, Martill & Hing (2018).
- A revision of non-passeriform landbird fossils from the Pleistocene of Shiriya (northeast Japan) is published by Watanabe, Matsuoka & Hasegawa (2018).
- Remains of 32 species of seabirds and related taxa are reported from the middle–late Pleistocene Shiriya local fauna (northeastern Japan) by Watanabe, Matsuoka & Hasegawa (2018).
- Description of Late Pleistocene bird fauna from Buso Doppio del Broion Cave (Berici Hills, Italy), including fossils of the snowy owl and the northern hawk-owl (considered to be markers of a colder climate than the present one) and the first Italian Pleistocene fossil remains of the Eurasian wren and the black redstart, is published by Carrera et al. (2018).
- Bird eggshell fragments are described from the Fitterer Ranch locality within the Oligocene Brule Formation (North Dakota, United States) by Lawver & Boyd (2018), who name a new ootaxon Metoolithus jacksonae.

=== New taxa ===
Name	Novelty	Status	Authors	Age	Unit	Location	Notes	Images
Aquila claudeguerini	Sp. nov	Valid	Mourer‑Chauviré & Bonifay	Early Pleistocene		France	A species of Aquila.	
Ardenna davealleni	Sp. nov	Valid	Tennyson & Mannering	Pliocene		New Zealand	A species of Ardenna.	
Chenoanas asiatica	Sp. nov	Valid	Zelenkov et al.	Middle Miocene		China; Mongolia	A duck.	
Cinclosoma elachum	Sp. nov	Valid	Nguyen, Archer & Hand	Miocene	Riversleigh World Heritage Area	Australia	A quail-thrush.	
Ducula tihonireasini	Sp. nov	Valid	Rigal, Kirch & Worthy	Holocene		French Polynesia	An imperial pigeon.	
Eogranivora	Gen. et sp. nov	Valid	Zheng et al.	Early Cretaceous	Yixian Formation	China	An early member of Ornithuromorpha. Genus includes new species E. edentulata.	
Gettyia	Gen. et comb. nov	Valid	Atterholt, Hutchison & O'Connor	Late Cretaceous (Campanian)	Two Medicine Formation	United States (Montana)	A member of Enantiornithes belonging to the family Avisauridae. The type species is "Avisaurus" gloriae Varricchio & Chiappe (1995).	
Jinguofortis	Gen. et sp. nov	Valid	Wang, Stidham & Zhou	Early Cretaceous	Dabeigou Formation	China	A basal member of Pygostylia, probably a relative of Chongmingia. Genus includes new species J. perplexus.	
Kischinskinia	Gen. et sp. nov	Valid	Volkova & Zelenkov	Early Miocene		Russia	A passerine belonging to the group Certhioidea. Genus includes new species K. scandens.	
Litorallus	Gen. et sp. nov	Valid	Mather et al.	Early Miocene (Altonian)	Bannockburn Formation	New Zealand	A rail. The type species is L. livezeyi.	
Mirarce	Gen. et sp. nov	Valid	Atterholt, Hutchison & O'Connor	Late Cretaceous (late Campanian)	Kaiparowits Formation	United States (Utah)	A member of Enantiornithes belonging to the family Avisauridae. The type species is M. eatoni.	
Muriwaimanu	Gen. et comb. nov	Valid	Mayr et al.	Late Paleocene	Waipara Greensand	New Zealand	An early penguin; a new genus for "Waimanu" tuatahi Ando, Jones & Fordyce in Slack et al. (2006).	
Pandion pannonicus	Sp. nov	Valid	Kessler	Late Oligocene		Hungary	A species of Pandion.	
Panraogallus	Gen. et sp. nov		Li et al.	Late Miocene	Liushu Formation	China	A member of the family Phasianidae. The type species is P. hezhengensis.	
Priscaweka	Gen. et sp. nov	Valid	Mather et al.	Early Miocene (Altonian)	Bannockburn Formation	New Zealand	A rail. The type species is P. parvales.	
Rallus gracilipes	Sp. nov	Valid	Takano & Steadman	Late Pleistocene		The Bahamas	A rail, a species of Rallus.	
Romainvillia kazakhstanensis	Sp. nov	Valid	Zelenkov	Late Eocene	Kustovskaya Formation	Kazakhstan	A member of Anseriformes belonging to the family Romainvillidae.	
Scolopax mira ohyamai	Subsp. nov.	Valid	Matsuoka & Hasegawa	Late Pleistocene		Japan	An extinct subspecies of the Amami woodcock (Scolopax mira).	
Sequiwaimanu	Gen. et sp. nov	Valid	Mayr et al.	Middle Paleocene	Waipara Greensand	New Zealand	An early penguin. Genus includes new species S. rosieae.	
Vanellus liffyae	Sp. nov.	Valid	De Pietri et al.	Late Pliocene		Australia	A species of Vanellus.	
Vorombe	Gen. et comb. nov	Disputed	Hansford & Turvey	Holocene		Madagascar	An elephant bird. The type species is "Aepyornis" titan Andrews (1894). Announced in 2018; the correction including the required ZooBank accession number was published in 2020. Tentatively synonymised with Aepyornis maximus by Grealy et al. (2023).	
Winnicavis	Gen. et sp. nov	Valid	Bocheński et al.	Oligocene (Rupelian)	Menilite Formation	Poland	A passerine of uncertain phylogenetic placement, approximately the size of a great tit. The type species is W. gorskii.	
Yangavis	Gen. et sp. nov	Valid	Wang & Zhou	Early Cretaceous (Aptian)	Yixian Formation	China	A member of the family Confuciusornithidae. Genus includes new species Y. confucii.	
Zygodactylus grandei	Sp. nov.	Valid	Smith, DeBee & Clarke	Early Eocene	Green River Formation	United States (Wyoming)	A member of the family Zygodactylidae.	

== Pterosaurs ==
=== Research ===
- A study on the morphological diversity of the mandibular shapes in pterosaurs is published by Navarro, Martin-Silverstone & Stubbs (2018).
- A synthesis of pterosaur dietary interpretations, evaluating how robustly supported different dietary interpretations are within, and between, key pterosaur groups, is published by Bestwick et al. (2018).
- A study on the validity of six ontogenetic stages in pterosaur life history proposed by Kellner (2015) is published by Dalla Vecchia (2018), who also considers Bergamodactylus wildi to be a junior synonym of Carniadactylus rosenfeldi.
- A pterosaur humerus from the Late Jurassic of Thailand, originally assigned to the group Azhdarchoidea, is reassigned to the family Rhamphorhynchidae by Unwin & Martill (2018).
- Description of soft parts preserved in the holotype specimen of Scaphognathus crassirostris is published by Jäger et al. (2018).
- A tooth of a large pterodactyloid pterosaur, most similar to the teeth of Coloborhynchus and Ludodactylus, is described from the Cretaceous (Albian) Aïn el Guettar Formation (Tunisia) by Martill, Ibrahim & Bouaziz (2018).
- A new juvenile specimen of Pteranodon (the smallest reported so far) is described from the Smoky Hill Chalk Member of the Niobrara Formation (Kansas, United States) by Bennett (2018).
- A metacarpal bone of a specimen of Pteranodon, bearing teeth marks likely produced by a shark and by a saurodontid fish, is described from the Campanian Mooreville Chalk (Alabama, United States) by Ehret & Harrell (2018).
- A series of neck vertebrae of Pteranodon associated with a tooth of the lamniform shark Cretoxyrhina mantelli is described from the Upper Cretaceous Niobrara Formation (Kansas, United States) by Hone, Witton & Habib (2018), who interpret the specimen as evidence of Cretoxyrhina biting Pteranodon.
- A giant humerus of a tapejaroid pterosaur is described from the Upper Cretaceous Plottier Formation (Argentina) by Ortiz David, González Riga & Kellner (2018).
- A revision of the taxonomy of Noripterus and other Asian members of the family Dsungaripteridae is published by Hone, Jiang & Xu (2018).
- A new thalassodromine specimen is described from the Lower Cretaceous Romualdo Formation (Brazil) by Buchmann et al. (2018), providing new information on the anatomy of the postcranial skeleton of members of the group.
- Redescription of the holotype of Thalassodromeus sethi is published by Pêgas, Costa & Kellner (2018), who transfer the species Banguela oberlii to the genus Thalassodromeus.
- Purported pterosaur pelvis from the Upper Cretaceous (Campanian) Dinosaur Park Formation (Canada) described by Funston, Martin-Silverstone & Currie (2017) is reinterpreted as a broken tyrannosaurid squamosal by Funston, Martin-Silverstone & Currie (2018).
- Partial mandible of a giant azhdarchid pterosaur, representing the largest pterosaur mandible reported so far, is described from the Upper Cretaceous (Maastrichtian) Hațeg Basin (Romania) by Vremir et al. (2018).

=== New taxa ===
Name	Novelty	Status	Authors	Age	Unit	Location	Notes	Images
Alcione	Gen. et sp. nov	Valid	Longrich, Martill & Andres	Late Cretaceous (late Maastrichtian)	Ouled Abdoun Basin	Morocco	A member of the family Nyctosauridae. The type species is A. elainus.	
Barbaridactylus	Gen. et sp. nov	Valid	Longrich, Martill & Andres	Late Cretaceous (late Maastrichtian)	Ouled Abdoun Basin	Morocco	A member of the family Nyctosauridae. The type species is B. grandis.	
Caelestiventus	Gen. et sp. nov	Valid	Britt et al.	Late Triassic (probably late Norian or Rhaetian)	Nugget Sandstone	United States (Utah)	A relative of Dimorphodon. Genus includes new species C. hanseni.	
Coloborhynchus fluviferox	Sp. nov	Valid	Jacobs et al.	Cretaceous	Kem Kem Beds	Morocco	Announced in 2018; the final version of the article naming it was published in 2019. Originally described as a species of Coloborhynchus, but subsequently transferred to the genus Nicorhynchus.	
Klobiodon	Gen. et sp. nov	Valid	O'Sullivan & Martill	Middle Jurassic (Bathonian)	Taynton Limestone Formation	United Kingdom	A member of the family Rhamphorhynchidae. The type species is K. rochei.	
Mistralazhdarcho	Gen. et sp. nov	Valid	Vullo et al.	Late Cretaceous (Campanian)		France	A member of the family Azhdarchidae. Genus includes new species M. maggii.	
Serradraco	Gen. et comb. nov	Valid	Rigal, Martill & Sweetman	Early Cretaceous (late Valanginian or early Hauterivian)	Upper Tunbridge Wells Sand Formation	United Kingdom	A pterodactyloid pterosaur; a new genus for "Pterodactylus" sagittirostris Owen (1874). Announced in 2017; the final version of the article naming it was published in 2018.	
Simurghia	Gen. et sp. nov	Valid	Longrich, Martill & Andres	Late Cretaceous (late Maastrichtian)	Ouled Abdoun Basin	Morocco	A member of the family Nyctosauridae. The type species is S. robusta.	
Tethydraco	Gen. et sp. nov	Valid	Longrich, Martill & Andres	Late Cretaceous (late Maastrichtian)	Ouled Abdoun Basin	Morocco	A pterosaur of uncertain phylogenetic placement, might be a member of the family Pteranodontidae or Azhdarchidae. The type species is T. regalis.	
Vesperopterylus	Gen. et sp. nov	Valid	Lü et al.	Early Cretaceous	Jiufotang Formation	China	A member of the family Anurognathidae. Genus includes new species V. lamadongensis. Announced in 2017; the final version of the article naming it was published in 2018.	
Xericeps	Gen. et sp. nov	Valid	Martill et al.	Cretaceous (Albian or early Cenomanian)	Kem Kem Beds	Morocco	A member of Azhdarchoidea. The type species is X. curvirostris. Announced in 2017; the final version of the article naming it was published in 2018.	

== Other archosaurs ==
=== Research ===
- A study on the anatomy of Teleocrater rhadinus is published by Nesbitt et al. (2018).
- A study on the phylogenetic relationships of lagerpetid dinosauromorphs is published by Müller, Langer & Dias-da-Silva (2018).
- New specimen of Dromomeron romeri (potentially representing the youngest known lagerpetid in North America, if not worldwide) is described from the Owl Rock Member of the Chinle Formation (Arizona, United States) by Marsh (2018).
- A study on the phylogenetic relationships of Pisanosaurus mertii is published by Agnolín & Rozadilla (2018), who interpret the taxon as a likely silesaurid.
- Reevaluation of Caseosaurus crosbyensis and a study on the phylogenetic relationships of the species is published by Baron & Williams (2018).
- Fossils of a member of the genus Smok of uncertain specific assignment are described from the Upper Triassic Marciszów site (southern Poland) by Niedźwiedzki & Budziszewska-Karwowska (2018).

=== New taxa ===
Name	Novelty	Status	Authors	Age	Unit	Location	Notes	Images
Soumyasaurus	Gen. et sp. nov	Valid	Sarıgül, Agnolín & Chatterjee	Late Triassic	Tecovas Formation	United States (Texas)	A member of Dinosauriformes, probably a member of the family Silesauridae. The type species is S. aenigmaticus.	
