= Daniadyptes =

Daniadyptes Temporal range: early Middle Paleocene (Selandian), ~61.4–59.5 Ma

Scientific classification
- Kingdom: Animalia
- Phylum: Chordata
- Class: Aves
- Clade: Austrodyptornithes
- Order: Sphenisciformes
- Genus: †Daniadyptes; Mayr et al., 2025
- Species: †D. primaevus

Binomial name
- †Daniadyptes primaevus Mayr et al., 2025

Genus of extinct penguins

Daniadyptes (meaning "Danian diver") is a genus of extinct penguins known from the Paleocene (Selandian age) Waipara Greensand of New Zealand. The genus contains a single species, Daniadyptes primaevus, known from a right humerus and possibly a right tibiotarsus. Phylogenetic analyses place Daniadyptes as the basalmost member of the Sphenisciformes.

Daniadyptes is one of many early-diverging sphenisciforms from the Waipara Greensand, all of which represent some of the oldest known penguins in the fossil record. The other named genera include Archaeodyptes, Muriwaimanu, Sequiwaimanu, Waimanu, Waimanutaha, and Waiparadyptes.
