= Archaeodyptes =

Archaeodyptes Temporal range: early Late Paleocene (Thanetian), ~59.4–57.6 Ma

Scientific classification
- Kingdom: Animalia
- Phylum: Chordata
- Class: Aves
- Clade: Austrodyptornithes
- Order: Sphenisciformes
- Genus: †Archaeodyptes; Mayr et al., 2025
- Species: †A. waitahaorum

Binomial name
- †Archaeodyptes waitahaorum Mayr et al., 2025

Genus of extinct penguins

Archaeodyptes (meaning "old diver") is a genus of extinct penguins known from the Paleocene (Thanetian age) Waipara Greensand of New Zealand. The genus contains a single species, Archaeodyptes waitahaorum, known from a partial skeleton including skull bones. It is comparable in size to the modern yellow-eyed penguin (Megadyptes antipodes).

Archaeodyptes is one of many early-diverging sphenisciforms from the Waipara Greensand, all of which represent some of the oldest known penguins in the fossil record. The other named genera include Daniadyptes, Muriwaimanu, Sequiwaimanu, Waimanu, Waimanutaha, and Waiparadyptes.
