= Waiparadyptes =

Waiparadyptes Temporal range: Early Paleocene (Danian), ~62.4–61.4 Ma

Scientific classification
- Kingdom: Animalia
- Phylum: Chordata
- Class: Aves
- Clade: Austrodyptornithes
- Order: Sphenisciformes
- Genus: †Waiparadyptes; Mayr et al., 2025
- Species: †W. gracilitarsus

Binomial name
- †Waiparadyptes gracilitarsus Mayr et al., 2025

Genus of extinct penguins

Waiparadyptes (meaning "Waipa [Greensand] diver") is a genus of extinct penguins known from the Paleocene (Thanetian age) Waipara Greensand of New Zealand. The genus contains a single species, Waiparadyptes gracilitarsus, known from a partial skeleton including a partial skull and mandible, as well as a partial left humerus and tarsometatarsus. Waiparadyptes has a surprisingly slender tarsometatarsus, while most early-diverging penguins have short and robust tarsometatarsi.

Waiparadyptes is one of many early-diverging sphenisciforms from the Waipara Greensand, all of which represent some of the oldest known penguins in the fossil record. The other named genera include Archaeodyptes, Daniadyptes, Muriwaimanu, Sequiwaimanu, Waimanu, and Waimanutaha.
