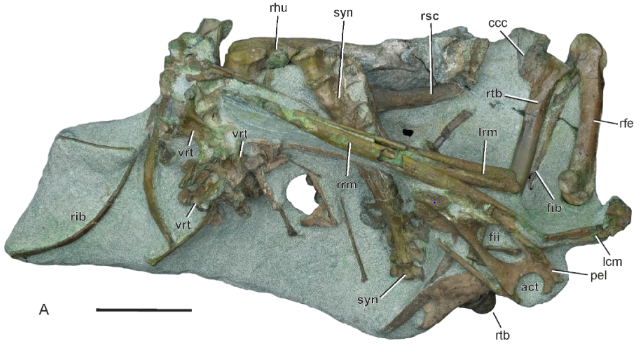
- Holotype specimen

Scientific classification
- Kingdom: Animalia
- Phylum: Chordata
- Class: Aves
- Clade: Austrodyptornithes
- Order: Sphenisciformes
- Genus: †Waimanutaha; Mayr et al., 2025
- Species: †W. kenlovei

Binomial name
- †Waimanutaha kenlovei Mayr et al., 2025

= Waimanutaha =

Waimanutaha Temporal range: latest Early or Middle Paleocene (Danian or Selandian), ~62.4–61.5 Ma

Genus of extinct penguins

Waimanutaha (meaning "beside Waimanu") is a genus of extinct penguins known from the Paleocene (Danian or Selandian ages) Waipara Greensand of New Zealand. The genus contains a single species, Waimanutaha kenlovei, known from a partial skeleton including the mandible and possibly two additional partial skeletons. The holotype specimen, CM 2018.124.4, was discovered in 2017 and initially described by Mayr et al. (2020), who assigned it to cf. Muriwaimanu, but phylogenetic separation and proportional differences ruled out this classification.

Waimanutaha is one of many early-diverging sphenisciforms from the Waipara Greensand, all of which represent some of the oldest known penguins in the fossil record. The other named genera include Archaeodyptes, Daniadyptes, Muriwaimanu, Sequiwaimanu, Waimanu, and Waiparadyptes.
