= Protodontopteryx =

Protodontopteryx Temporal range: Early Paleocene, ~62–61.5 Ma

Scientific classification
- Kingdom: Animalia
- Phylum: Chordata
- Class: Aves
- Order: †Odontopterygiformes
- Family: †Pelagornithidae
- Genus: †Protodontopteryx; Mayr et al., 2019

Type species
- †Protodontopteryx ruthae Mayr et al., 2019

Extinct genus of birds

Protodontopteryx is a genus of pelagornithid (pseudotooth bird) that lived in New Zealand roughly 62 million years ago, during the early Paleocene epoch. It contains one species, Protodontopteryx ruthae. Protodontopteryx is the smallest, oldest, and most basal pelagornithid discovered.

== Discovery and naming ==
The holotype specimen of Protodontopteryx ruthae, CM 2018.124.8, was collected in the Canterbury Region of New Zealand on 11 November 2017 by Leigh Love. It is from the Mt Ellen Member of the Waipara Greensand. The specimen is a partial skeleton including the skull, portions of the limb bones, some vertebrae, and a wing phalanx. The latter two are in a separate block of matrix from the rest, and none of the bones are preserved in articulation; since there exists a possibility the fossil contains bones from two different individuals (and potentially different species), the authors specifically designate the skull as the holotype. Another specimen, CM 2018.124.9, was also referred to P. ruthae; it consists of the proximal end of a left humerus and distal sections of ?radius and ?ulna, and was collected from the Mt Ellen Member in 2016 by Love.

In 2019, Protodontopteryx ruthae was described by Gerald Mayr, Vanesa L. De Pietri, Leigh Love, Al Mannering, and Richard Paul Scofield. The generic name combines the Greek proto ("first") with Odontopteryx, one of the earliest-coined names for a pelagornithid. The specific name honors Ruth Love, the wife of the fossil's collector Leigh Love.

== Description ==
With an estimated wingspan of about 1 meter (3.3 feet), Protodontopteryx was the size of an average gull—much smaller than all post-Paleocene pelagornithids. It had a much stouter humerus than a typical pelagornithid, indicating it was less specialized toward sustained soaring.

The beak was similar in relative length to that of other pelagornithids, but was deeper at the base and therefore tapered more strongly toward the tip. The tip was more downcurved than in other pelagornithids. The external nostrils were larger than the very reduced nostrils of other pelagornithids, and were more similar in size and position to those of albatrosses. This suggests Protodontopteryx was less pelagic than later pelagornithids (many living aequornithean seabirds have reduced external nostrils to protect the nasal cavity against saltwater). Like other pelagornithids, Protodontopteryx had tooth-like projections on its beak called pseudoteeth—though these were shorter and less sharply pointed than those of its relatives, and the small interspersed pseudoteeth seen on many other pelagornithids were absent.

== Paleobiology ==
The short pseudoteeth of Protodontopteryx, contrasted with the more fragile needle-like pseudoteeth of later pelagornithids, may indicate a dietary shift in the family's evolution: Protodontopteryx may have been mainly piscivorous, while later species foraged for squid and other molluscs.

== Paleoecology ==
During the early Paleocene when Protodontopteryx lived, New Zealand had a tropical climate with a sea temperature of about 25 degrees Celsius (77 degrees Fahrenheit). Other birds found in the Waipara Greensand include the earliest known tropicbird (Clymenoptilon) and the earliest known penguins (Waimanu and Muriwaimanu).
