= Waipara Greensand =

Geologic formation in New Zealand

- Stratigraphic range: Palaeocene, ~62–58 Ma Selandian-Thanetian
- Type: Geological formation
- Sub-units: Mount Ellen Member, Stormmont Member
- Underlies: Ashley Mudstone
- Overlies: Loburn Formation

Lithology
- Primary: Sandstone

Location
- Coordinates: 43.076°S 172.807°E
- Region: Canterbury
- Country: New Zealand

Type section
- Named for: Waipara River
- Waipara Greensand (New Zealand)

The Waipara Greensand is a geological rock unit found in Canterbury, New Zealand. It dates from just after the Cretaceous–Paleogene extinction event, the Selandian and Thanetian, around 62–58 million years ago in the Palaeocene. It is well known for its fossils, particularly for containing the oldest penguins (Sphenisciformes) and also containing shark and fish fossils.

== Geology ==
The Waipara Greensand is a fine to medium-grained, richly glauconitic quartzose sandstone. It crops out throughout North Canterbury. It has been interpreted as having been deposited in a shallow marine setting under conditions of very slow sedimentation. It is deepest in the Waipara River area, where it reaches a thickness of about 80 metres (260 ft), thinning to the south and north.

The Waipara Greensand are Thanetian and Selandian in age (62 to 58 Mya). The top of the Waipara Greensand marks the Teurian–Waipawan New Zealand stage boundary, which is correlated internationally with the Paleocene-Eocene boundary.

== Fossils ==
The Waipara Greensand is only sparsely fossiliferous, but there are some significant discoveries made from this rock unit. There have been at least at least 16 neoselachian sharks found, including Chlamydoselachus keyesi and Centroselachus goord, as well as the enigmatic Waiparaconus, which is either a barnacle or a coelenterate, the remains of the early-diverging penguins Archaeodyptes, Daniadyptes, Muriwaimanu, Sequiwaimanu, Waimanu, Waimanutaha, and Waiparadyptes, the early tropicbird Clymenoptilon, and rarely also fish bones and poorly preserved molluscs. Nanofossils include two key age‐diagnostic taxa, Chiasmolithus bidens and Hornbrookina teuriensis.

The majority of shark specimens were recovered from loose weathered material that accumulates at the foot of steep banks along the Waipara River. Gypsum often encrusts the teeth, making identification difficult.

=== Birds ===
Color key: Taxon / Reclassified taxon / Taxon falsely reported as present / Dubious taxon or junior synonym / Ichnotaxon / Ootaxon / Morphotaxon	Notes; Uncertain or tentative taxa are in small text; ~~crossed out~~ taxa are discredited.

Birds reported from the Waipara Greensand
Genus	Species	Location	Stratigraphic position	Material	Notes	Images
Archaeodyptes	A. waitahaorum			A partial skeleton including skull bones	An early penguin.	Waimanu
Australornis	A. lovei			Wing and pectoral girdle	An early seabird	Waimanu
Clymenoptilon	C. novaezealandicum			A skull	An early tropicbird	Waimanu
Daniadyptes	D. primaevus			A right humerus and possibly a right tibiotarsus.	An early penguin	Waimanu
Muriwaimanu	M. tuatahi			A skull, partial mandible, and some partial skeleton	An early penguin	Waimanu
Protodontopteryx	P. ruthae			A partial skeleton including the skull, portions of the limb bones, some vertebrae, and a wing phalanx.	An early pseudotooth bird	Waimanu
Sequiwaimanu	S. rosieae			A wing bone	An early penguin	Waimanu
Waimanu	W. manneringi			A partial skeleton comprising almost complete right tibiotarsus, proximal half of right fibula, right tarsometatarsus, right pelvis, and synsacrum (with last thoracic vertebra attached to the synsacrum), and four caudal vertebrae.	An early penguin	Waimanu
Waimanutaha	W. kenlovei			A partial skeleton including the mandible and possibly two additional partial skeletons	An early penguin	Waimanu
Waiparadyptes	W. gracilitarsus			A partial skeleton including a partial skull and mandible, as well as a partial left humerus and tarsometatarsus.	An early penguin	Waimanu
