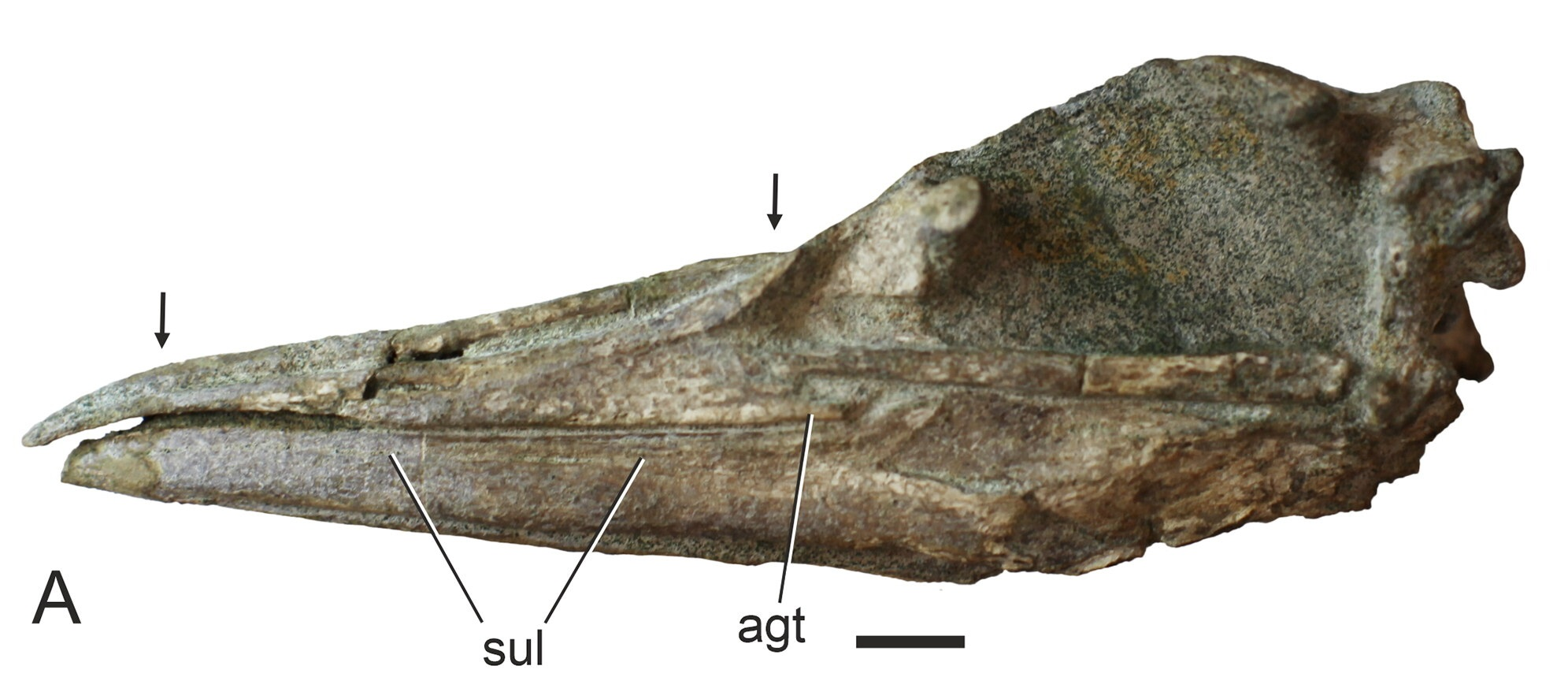
- Skull

Scientific classification
- Kingdom: Animalia
- Phylum: Chordata
- Class: Aves
- Order: Phaethontiformes
- Genus: †Clymenoptilon; Mayr et al, 2023
- Species: †C. novaezealandicum

Binomial name
- †Clymenoptilon novaezealandicum Mayr et al, 2023

= Clymenoptilon =

Clymenoptilon Temporal range: 62–61 Ma

Extinct genus of phaethontiform bird

Clymenoptilon is an extinct genus of phaethontiform bird related to modern tropicbirds. It contains a single species, C. novaezealandicum from the Paleocene-aged Waipara Greensand of New Zealand. Its name references Clymene, the mother of Phaethon in Greek mythology.

It is known from a partial skeleton with a nearly complete skull. It is the earliest known phaethontiform from the Southern Hemisphere (living only a few million years after the Cretaceous-Paleogene extinction event), suggesting that the group may have originated in Zealandia. It lived alongside the early pseudotooth bird Protodontopteryx, also one of the oldest representatives of its order.
