= Ignotornis =

Ignotornis Temporal range: Barremian-Cenomanian, 126–98 Ma

Trace fossil classification
- Domain: Eukaryota
- Kingdom: Animalia
- Phylum: Chordata
- Class: Aves
- Ichnofamily: †Ignotornidae
- Ichnogenus: †Ignotornis; Mehl, 1931

Type ichnospecies
- †Ignotornis mcconnelli Mehl, 1931

Ichnospecies
- †Ignotornis canadensis Buckley, McCrea & Xing, 2018; †Ignotornis mcconnelli Mehl, 1931; †Ignotornis yangi Kim et al., 2006

Trace fossil

Ignotornis was a bird ichnogenus dating back to the Barremian-Cenomanian of Colorado, Canada and South Korea.
