= Litorallus =

Litorallus Temporal range: Burdigalian

Scientific classification
- Kingdom: Animalia
- Phylum: Chordata
- Class: Aves
- Order: Gruiformes
- Family: Rallidae
- Genus: †Litorallus
- Species: †L. livezeyi

Binomial name
- †Litorallus livezeyi Mather et al., 2019

Extinct genus of rail

Litorallus is an extinct monotypic genus of rail that lived in Zealandia during the Burdigalian stage of the Miocene epoch.

== Etymology ==
The generic name Litorallus derives from the Latin words litore and rallus, meaning shore and rail, respectively. The specific epithet of the type species, Litorallus livezeyi, references the ornithologist Bradley C. Livezey for his work studying the evolution of rails.
