= Priscaweka =

Priscaweka Temporal range: Burdigalian

Scientific classification
- Kingdom: Animalia
- Phylum: Chordata
- Class: Aves
- Order: Gruiformes
- Family: Rallidae
- Genus: †Priscaweka
- Species: †P. parvales

Binomial name
- †Priscaweka parvales Mather et al., 2019

Extinct genus of flightless rail

Priscaweka is an extinct monotypic genus of rail that inhabited Zealandia during the Burdigalian stage of the Miocene epoch.

== Palaeobiology ==
Priscaweka parvales was flightless. It exhibited substantial sexual dimorphism.
