= Winnicavis =

Winnicavis Temporal range: 33.9–28.4 Ma Early Oligocene

Scientific classification
- Kingdom: Animalia
- Phylum: Chordata
- Class: Aves
- Order: Passeriformes
- Genus: †Winnicavis; Bocheński et al., 2018

Type species
- †Winnicavis gorskii (Bocheński et al., 2018)

Extinct genus of birds

Winnicavis is a genus of passerine bird from the Early Oligocene of Poland.
