= Aquila claudeguerini =

Aquila claudeguerini Temporal range: Early Pleistocene

Scientific classification
- Kingdom: Animalia
- Phylum: Chordata
- Class: Aves
- Order: Accipitriformes
- Family: Accipitridae
- Genus: Aquila
- Species: †A. claudeguerini

Binomial name
- †Aquila claudeguerini Mourer-Chauviré & Bonifay, 2018

Extinct species of eagle

Aquila claudeguerini is an extinct species of Aquila that lived during the Early Pleistocene.

== Distribution ==
Aquila claudeguerini fossils are known from the site of Ceyssaguet in France.
