= Kischinskinia =

Kischinskinia Temporal range: Late Miocene

Scientific classification
- Domain: Eukaryota
- Kingdom: Animalia
- Phylum: Chordata
- Class: Aves
- Order: Passeriformes
- Superfamily: Certhioidea
- Genus: †Kischinskinia; Volkova & Zelenov., 2018

Type species
- †Kischinskinia scandens Volkova & Zelenov., 2018

Extinct genus of birds

Kischinskinia is an extinct genus of passerine bird from late Miocene deposits of Russia. The type, and only species is Kischinskinia scandens.
