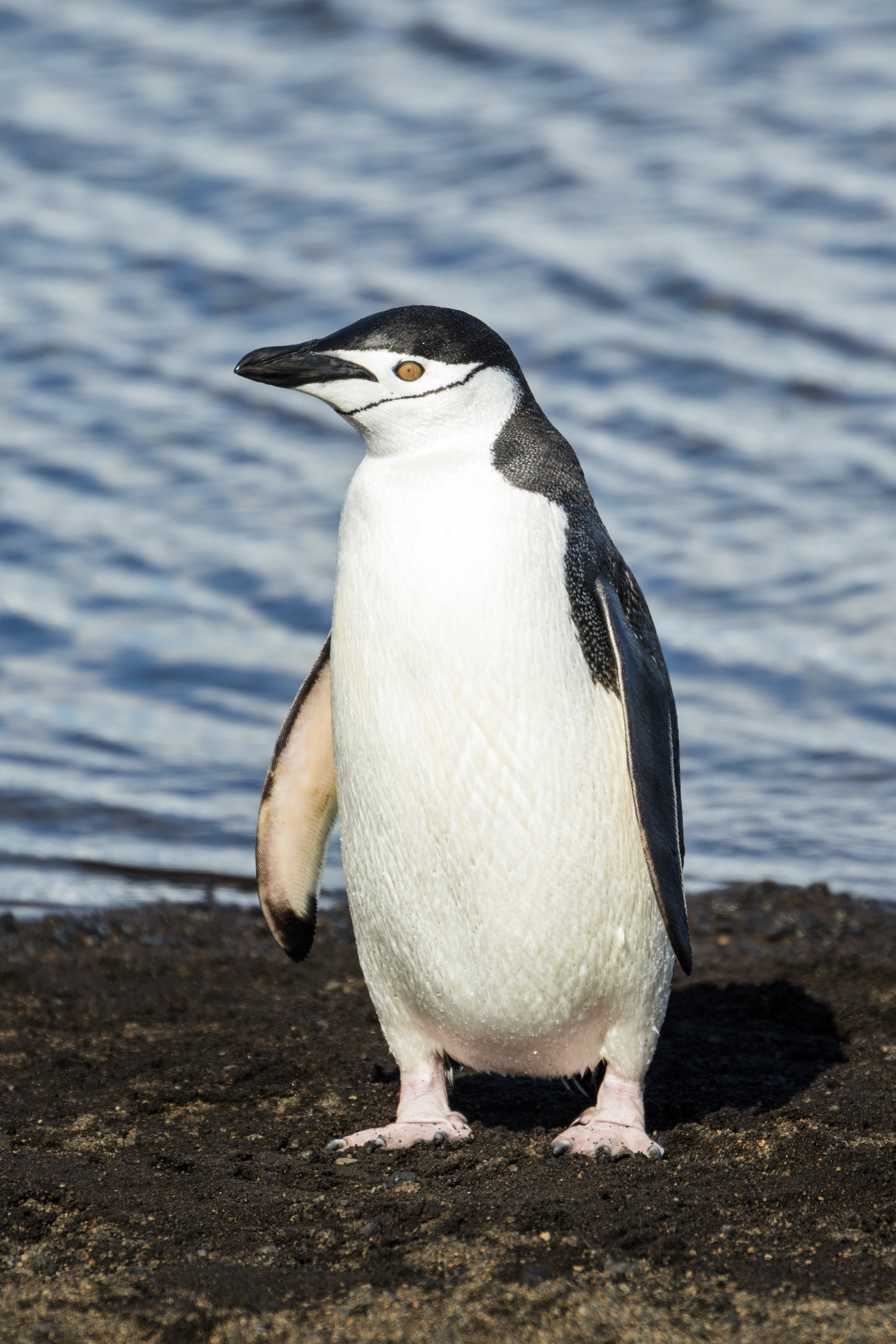
- Chinstrap penguin (Pygoscelis antarcticus)

Scientific classification
- Kingdom: Animalia
- Phylum: Chordata
- Class: Aves
- Clade: Austrodyptornithes
- Order: Sphenisciformes; Sharpe, 1891
- Family: Spheniscidae; Bonaparte, 1831

Living genera
- Aptenodytes Miller, J. F. 1778; Eudyptes Vieillot 1816; Eudyptula Bonaparte 1856; Megadyptes Milne-Edwards 1880; Pygoscelis Wagler 1832; Spheniscus Brisson 1760; For fossil taxa, see the list of penguins (fossil species)
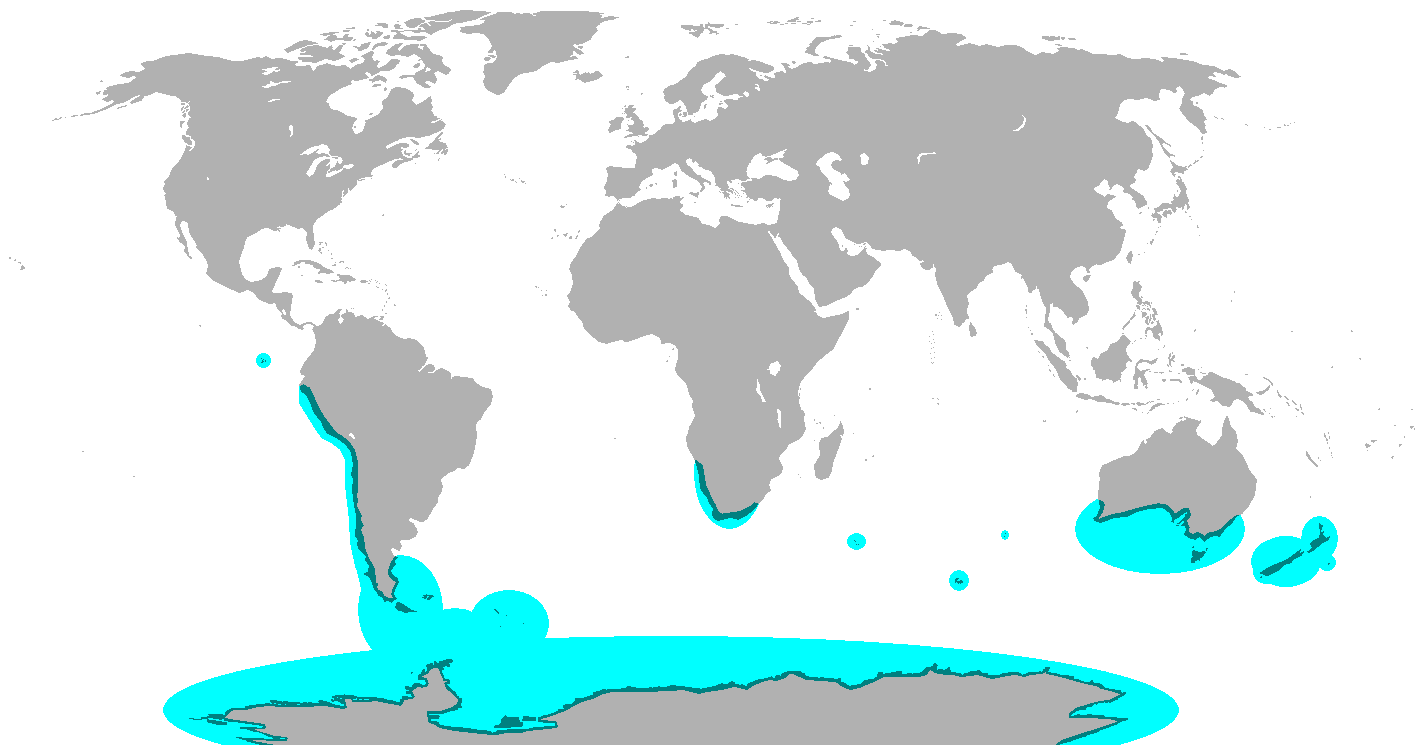
- Breeding range of penguins, all species (aqua); some species have wider seasonal migration ranges

= Penguin =

Penguins Temporal range: Late Danian – Recent, 62–0 Ma Possible Cretaceous origin according to molecular data

Family of aquatic flightless birds

Penguins are a group of flightless semi-aquatic sea birds which live almost exclusively in the Southern Hemisphere. Only one species, the Galapagos penguin, lives at, and slightly north of, the equator. Highly adapted for life in the ocean water, penguins have countershaded dark and white plumage and flippers for swimming. Most penguins feed on krill, fish, squid and other forms of sea life which they catch with their bills and swallow whole while swimming. A penguin has a spiny tongue and powerful jaws to grip slippery prey.

They spend about half of their lives on land and the other half in the sea. The largest living species is the emperor penguin (Aptenodytes forsteri): on average, adults are about 1.1 m (3 ft 7 in) tall and weigh 35 kg (77 lb). The smallest penguin species is the little blue penguin (Eudyptula minor), also known as the fairy penguin, which stands around 30–33 cm (12–13 in) tall and weighs 1.2–1.3 kg (2.6–2.9 lb). Today, larger penguins generally inhabit colder regions, and smaller penguins inhabit regions with temperate or tropical climates. Some prehistoric penguin species were enormous: as tall or heavy as an adult human. There was a great diversity of species in subantarctic regions, and at least one giant species in a region around 2,000 km south of the equator 35 mya, during the Late Eocene, a climate decidedly warmer than today.

== Etymology ==
The word penguin first appears in literature at the end of the 16th century as a synonym for the great auk. When European explorers discovered what are today known as penguins in the Southern Hemisphere, they noticed their similar appearance to the great auk of the Northern Hemisphere and named them after this bird, although they are not closely related.

The etymology of the word penguin is still debated. The English word is not apparently of French, Breton or Spanish origin (the latter two are attributed to the French word pingouin), but first appears in English or Dutch.

Some dictionaries suggest a derivation from Welsh pen, 'head' and gwyn, 'white', including the Oxford English Dictionary, the American Heritage Dictionary, the Century Dictionary and Merriam-Webster, on the basis that the name was originally applied to the great auk, either because it was found on White Head Island (Welsh: Pen Gwyn) in Newfoundland, or because it had white circles around its eyes (though the head was black). However, the Welsh word pen can also be used to mean 'end' and, in a maritime context, pen blaen means 'front end or part, bow (of a ship), prow'.

An alternative etymology links the word to Latin pinguis, which means 'fat' or 'oil'. Support for this etymology can be found in the alternative Germanic word for penguin, fettgans or 'fat-goose', and the related Dutch word vetgans. A group of penguins in the water is sometimes called a raft.

=== Pinguinus ===
Since 1791, the Latin word Pinguinus has been used in scientific classification to name the genus of the great auk (Pinguinus impennis, meaning "plump or fat without flight feathers"), which became extinct in the mid-19th century. As confirmed by a 2004 genetic study, the genus Pinguinus belongs in the family of the auks (Alcidae), within the order of the Charadriiformes.

The birds currently known as penguins were discovered later and were so named by sailors because of their physical resemblance to the great auk. Despite this resemblance, however, they are not auks, and are not closely related to the great auk. They do not belong in the genus Pinguinus, and are not classified in the same family and order as the great auk. They were classified in 1831 by Charles Lucien Bonaparte in several distinct genera within the family Spheniscidae and order Sphenisciformes.

== Systematics and evolution ==
=== Taxonomy ===
The family name of Spheniscidae was given by Charles Lucien Bonaparte from the genus Spheniscus, the name of that genus comes from the Greek word σφήν sphēn "wedge" used for the shape of an African penguin's swimming flippers.

Some recent sources apply the phylogenetic taxon Spheniscidae to what here is referred to as Spheniscinae. Furthermore, they restrict the phylogenetic taxon Sphenisciformes to flightless taxa, and establish the phylogenetic taxon Pansphenisciformes as equivalent to the Linnean taxon Sphenisciformes, i.e., including any flying basal "proto-penguins" to be discovered eventually. Given that neither the relationships of the penguin subfamilies to each other nor the placement of the penguins in the avian phylogeny is presently resolved, this is confusing, so the established Linnean system is followed here.

The number of penguin species is typically listed as between seventeen and nineteen. The International Ornithologists' Union recognizes six genera and eighteen species:

Penguin genera
Genus	Species	Image of type species
Eudyptes (crested penguins)	Macaroni penguin (E. chrysolophus); Royal penguin (E. schlegeli); Northern rockhopper penguin (E. moseleyi); Southern rockhopper penguin (E. chrysocome); Fiordland penguin (E. pachyrhynchus); Snares penguin (E. robustus); Erect-crested penguin (E. sclateri)	Southern rockhopper penguin
Spheniscus (banded penguins)	Galapagos penguin (S. mendiculus); Humboldt penguin (S. humboldti); Magellanic penguin (S. magellanicus); African penguin (S. demersus)	African penguin
Pygoscelis (brush-tailed penguins)	Adélie penguin (P. adeliae); Chinstrap penguin (P. antarcticus); Gentoo penguin (P. papua)	Chinstrap penguin
Aptenodytes (great penguins)	King penguin (A. patagonicus); Emperor penguin (A.forsteri)	King penguin
Eudyptula	Little penguin (E. minor)	Little penguin
Megadyptes	Yellow-eyed penguin (M. antipodes)	Yellow-eyed penguin

=== Evolution ===
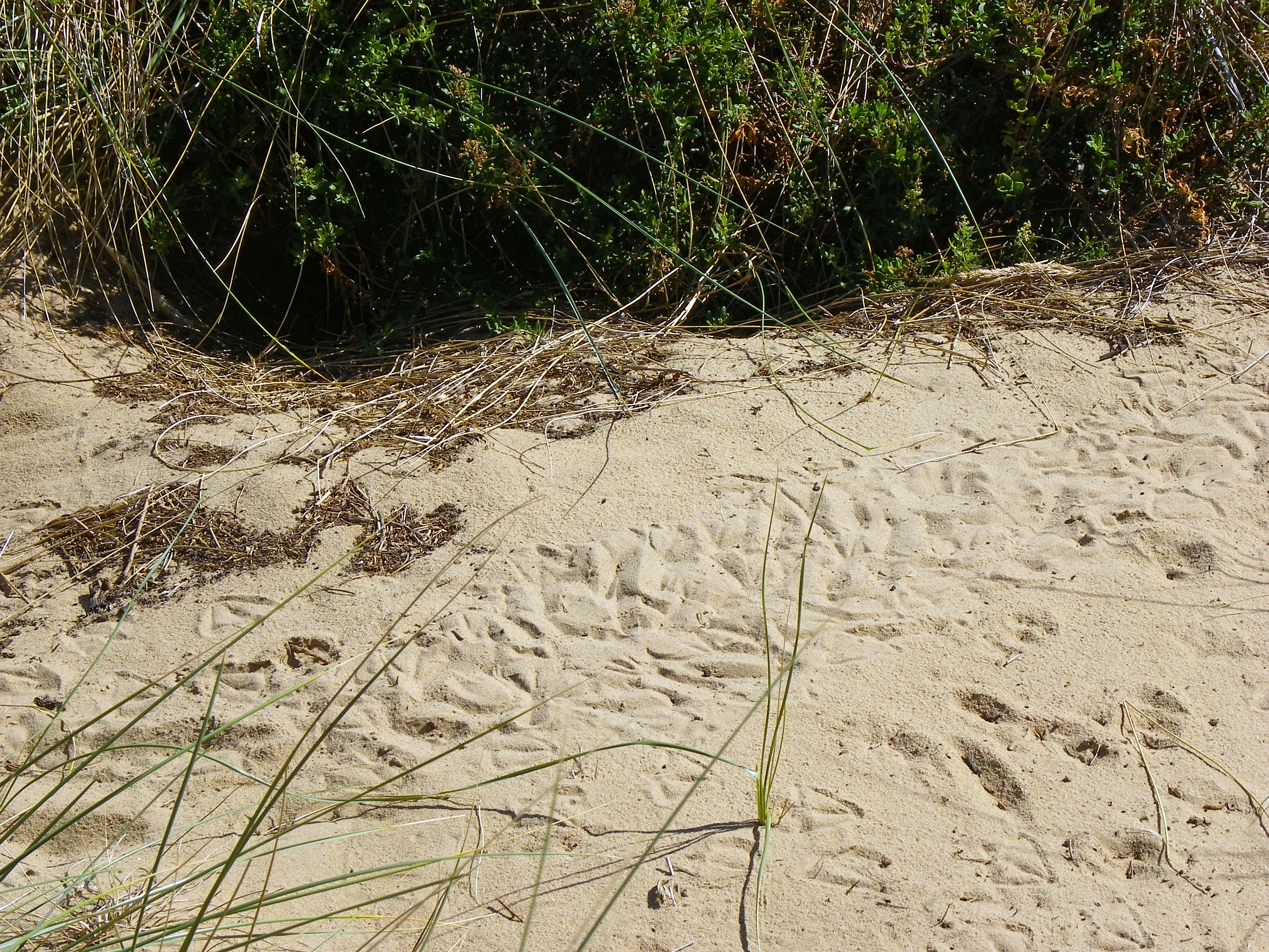
Penguin tracks in the sand on Bruny Island, Tasmania

Although the evolutionary and biogeographic history of Sphenisciformes is well-researched, many prehistoric forms are not fully described. Some seminal articles about the evolutionary history of penguins have been published since 2005.

The basal penguins lived around the time of the Cretaceous–Paleogene extinction event in the general area of southern New Zealand and Byrd Land, Antarctica. Due to plate tectonics, these areas were at that time less than 1,500 kilometres (930 mi) apart rather than 4,000 kilometres (2,500 mi). The most recent common ancestor of penguins and Procellariiformes can be roughly dated to the Campanian–Maastrichtian boundary, around 70–68 mya.

==== Basal fossils ====
The oldest known fossil penguin species are known from the Waipara Greensand of New Zealand, which spans the late Danian to early Thanetian stages (~62.5–58 Ma) of the Paleocene epoch. Several genera have been named from these outcrops, including Archaeodyptes, Daniadyptes, Muriwaimanu, Sequiwaimanu, Waimanu, Waimanutaha, and Waiparadyptes. While they were not as well-adapted to aquatic life as modern penguins, they were still flightless, with short wings adapted for deep diving. They swam on the surface using mainly their feet, but the wings were—as opposed to most other diving birds (both living and extinct)—already adapting to underwater locomotion.

Perudyptes from northern Peru was dated to 42 mya. An unnamed fossil from Argentina proves that, by the Bartonian (Middle Eocene), some 39–38 mya, primitive penguins had spread to South America and were in the process of expanding into Atlantic waters.

==== Palaeeudyptines ====
During the Late Eocene and the Early Oligocene (40–30 mya), some lineages of gigantic penguins existed. Nordenskjoeld's giant penguin was the tallest, growing nearly 1.80 meters (5.9 feet) tall. The New Zealand giant penguin was probably the heaviest, weighing 80 kilograms (180 lb) or more. Both were found on New Zealand, the former also in the Antarctic farther eastwards.

Traditionally, most extinct species of penguins, giant or small, had been placed in the paraphyletic subfamily called Palaeeudyptinae. More recently, with new taxa being discovered and placed in the phylogeny if possible, it is becoming accepted that there were at least two major extinct lineages. One or two closely related ones occurred in Patagonia, and at least one other—which is or includes the paleeudyptines as recognized today – occurred on most Antarctic and Subantarctic coasts.

Size plasticity was significant at this initial stage of radiation: on Seymour Island, Antarctica, for example, around 10 known species of penguins ranging in size from medium to large apparently coexisted some 35 mya during the Priabonian (Late Eocene). It is not known whether the palaeeudyptines constitute a monophyletic lineage, or whether gigantism evolved independently in a restricted Palaeeudyptinae and the Anthropornithinae – whether they were considered valid, or whether there was a wide size range present in the Palaeeudyptinae as delimited (i.e., including Anthropornis nordenskjoeldi). The oldest well-described giant penguin, the 5-foot (1.5 m)-tall Icadyptes salasi, existed as far north as northern Peru about 36 mya.

Gigantic penguins had disappeared by the end of the Paleogene, around 25 mya. Their decline and disappearance coincided with the spread of the Squalodontidae and other primitive, fish-eating toothed whales, which competed with them for food and were ultimately more successful. A new lineage, the Paraptenodytes, which includes smaller and stout-legged forms, had already arisen in southernmost South America by that time. The early Neogene saw the emergence of another morphotype in the same area, the similarly sized but more gracile Palaeospheniscinae, as well as the radiation that gave rise to the current biodiversity of penguins.

==== Origin and systematics of modern penguins ====
Modern penguins constitute two undisputed clades and another two more basal genera with more ambiguous relationships. To help resolve the evolution of this order, 19 high-coverage genomes that, together with two previously published genomes, encompass all extant penguin species have been sequenced. The origin of the Spheniscinae lies probably in the latest Paleogene and, geographically, it must have been much the same as the general area in which the order evolved: the oceans between the Australia-New Zealand region and the Antarctic. Presumably diverging from other penguins around 40 mya, it seems that the Spheniscinae were for quite some time limited to their ancestral area, as the well-researched deposits of the Antarctic Peninsula and Patagonia have not yielded Paleogene fossils of the subfamily. Also, the earliest spheniscine lineages are those with the most southern distribution.

The genus Aptenodytes appears to be the basalmost divergence among living penguins. They have bright yellow-orange neck, breast, and bill patches; incubate by placing their eggs on their feet, and when they hatch the chicks are almost naked. This genus has a distribution centred on the Antarctic coasts and barely extends to some Subantarctic islands today.

Pygoscelis contains species with a fairly simple black-and-white head pattern; their distribution is intermediate, centred on Antarctic coasts but extending somewhat northwards from there. In external morphology, these apparently still resemble the common ancestor of the Spheniscinae, as Aptenodytes' autapomorphies are, in most cases, fairly pronounced adaptations related to that genus' extreme habitat conditions. As the former genus, Pygoscelis seems to have diverged during the Bartonian, but the range expansion and radiation that led to the present-day diversity probably did not occur until much later; around the Burdigalian stage of the Early Miocene, roughly 20–15 mya.

The genera Spheniscus and Eudyptula contain species with a mostly Subantarctic distribution centred on South America; some, however, range quite far northwards. They all lack carotenoid colouration and the former genus has a conspicuous banded head pattern; they are unique among living penguins by nesting in burrows. This group probably radiated eastwards with the Antarctic Circumpolar Current out of the ancestral range of modern penguins throughout the Chattian (Late Oligocene), starting approximately 28 mya. While the two genera separated during this time, the present-day diversity is the result of a Pliocene radiation, taking place some 4–2 mya.

The Megadyptes–Eudyptes clade occurs at similar latitudes (though not as far north as the Galápagos penguin), has its highest diversity in the New Zealand region, and represents a westward dispersal. They are characterized by hairy yellow ornamental head feathers; their bills are at least partly red. These two genera diverged apparently in the Middle Miocene (Langhian, roughly 15–14 mya), although the living species of Eudyptes are the product of a later radiation, stretching from about the late Tortonian (Late Miocene, 8 mya) to the end of the Pliocene.

==== Geography ====
The geographical and temporal pattern of spheniscine evolution corresponds closely to two episodes of global cooling documented in the paleoclimatic record. The emergence of the Subantarctic lineage at the end of the Bartonian corresponds with the onset of the slow period of cooling that eventually led to the ice ages some 35 million years later. With habitat on the Antarctic coasts declining, by the Priabonian more hospitable conditions for most penguins existed in the Subantarctic regions rather than in Antarctica itself. Notably, the cold Antarctic Circumpolar Current also started as a continuous circumpolar flow only around 30 mya, on the one hand forcing the Antarctic cooling, and on the other facilitating the eastward expansion of Spheniscus to South America and eventually beyond. Despite this, there is no fossil evidence to support the idea of crown radiation from the Antarctic continent in the Paleogene, although DNA study favors such a radiation.

Later, an interspersed period of slight warming was ended by the Middle Miocene Climate Transition, a sharp drop in global average temperature from 14 to 12 mya, and similar abrupt cooling events followed at 8 mya and 4 mya; by the end of the Tortonian, the Antarctic ice sheet was already much like today in volume and extent. The emergence of most of today's Subantarctic penguin species almost certainly was caused by this sequence of Neogene climate shifts.

==== Relationship to other bird orders ====
Penguin ancestry beyond Waimanu remains unknown and not well-resolved by molecular or morphological analyses. The latter tend to be confounded by the strong adaptive autapomorphies of the Sphenisciformes; a sometimes perceived fairly close relationship between penguins and grebes is almost certainly an error based on both groups' strong diving adaptations, which are homoplasies. On the other hand, different DNA sequence datasets do not agree in detail with each other either.

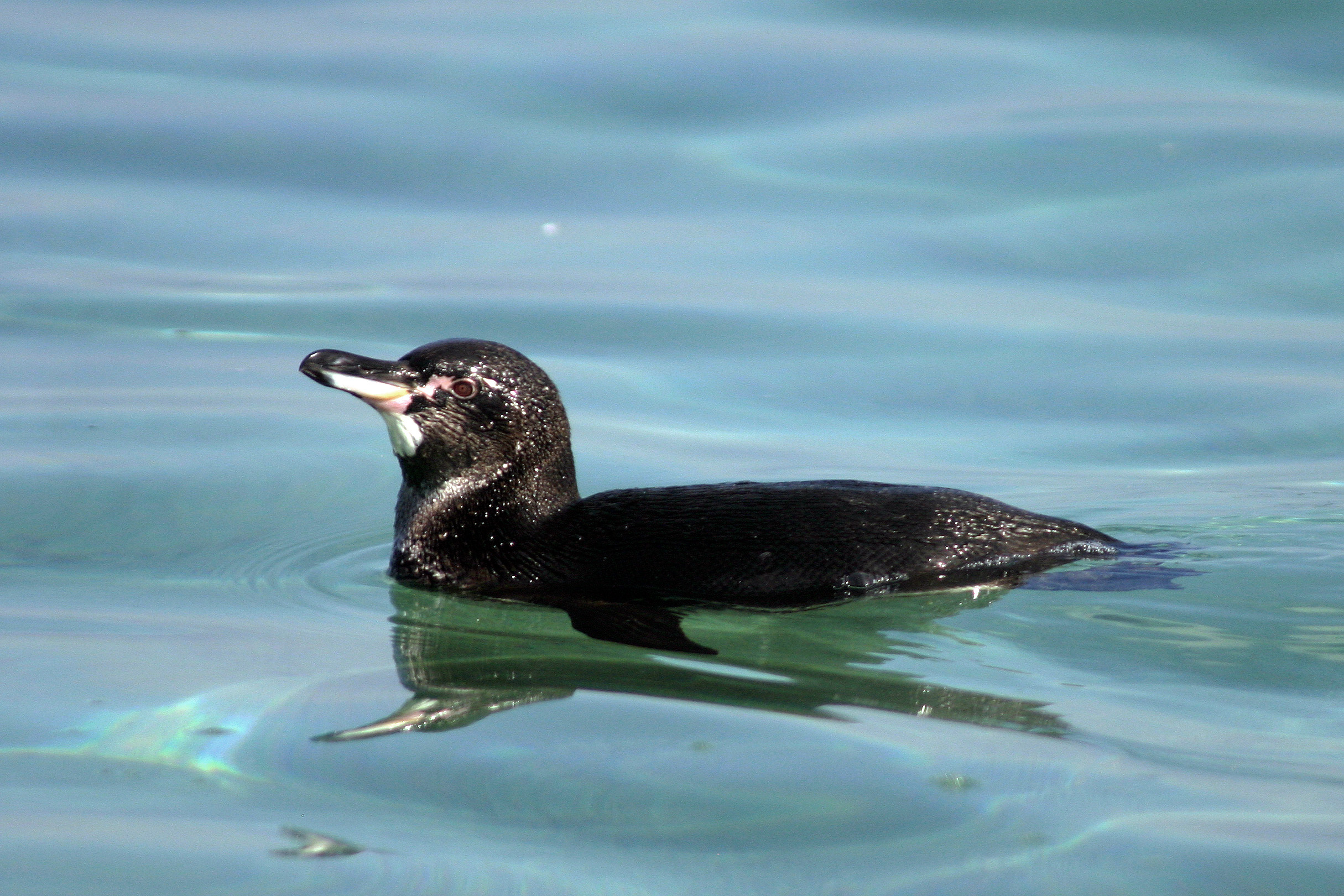
The endangered Galapagos penguin. The penguin is an accomplished swimmer, having flippers instead of wings.

What seems clear is that penguins belong to a clade of Neoaves (living birds except for paleognaths and fowl) that comprises what is sometimes called "higher waterbirds" to distinguish them from the more ancient waterfowl. This group contains such birds as storks, rails, and the seabirds, with the possible exception of the Charadriiformes.

Inside this group, penguin relationships are far less clear. Depending on the analysis and dataset, a close relationship to Ciconiiformes or to Procellariiformes has been suggested. Some think the penguin-like plotopterids (usually considered relatives of cormorants and anhingas) may actually be a sister group of the penguins and those penguins may have ultimately shared a common ancestor with the Pelecaniformes and consequently would have to be included in that order, or that the plotopterids were not as close to other pelecaniforms as generally assumed, which would necessitate splitting the traditional Pelecaniformes into three.

A 2014 analysis of whole genomes of 48 representative bird species has concluded that penguins are the sister group of Procellariiformes, from which they diverged about 60 million years ago (95% CI, 56.8–62.7).

The distantly related Charadriiform puffins, which live in the North Pacific and North Atlantic, developed similar characteristics to survive in the Arctic and sub-Arctic environments. Like the penguins, puffins have a white chest, black back and short stubby wings providing excellent swimming ability in icy water. But, unlike penguins, puffins can fly, as flightless birds would not survive alongside land-based predators such as polar bears and foxes; there are no such predators in the Antarctic. Their similarities indicate that similar environments in different parts of the world can result in similar evolutionary developments, i.e. convergent evolution. Puffins are auks (Alcidae), akin to the aforementioned great auk, which have a greater resemblance to "true" penguins after converging on more features of their anatomy.

== Anatomy and physiology ==
Penguin wings have the same general bone structure as flighted birds, but the bones are shorter and stouter to allow them to serve as fins. 1). Humerus 2). Sesamoid Bone 3). Radius 4). Ulna 5). Radial Carpal bone 6). Carpometacarpus 7). Phalanges

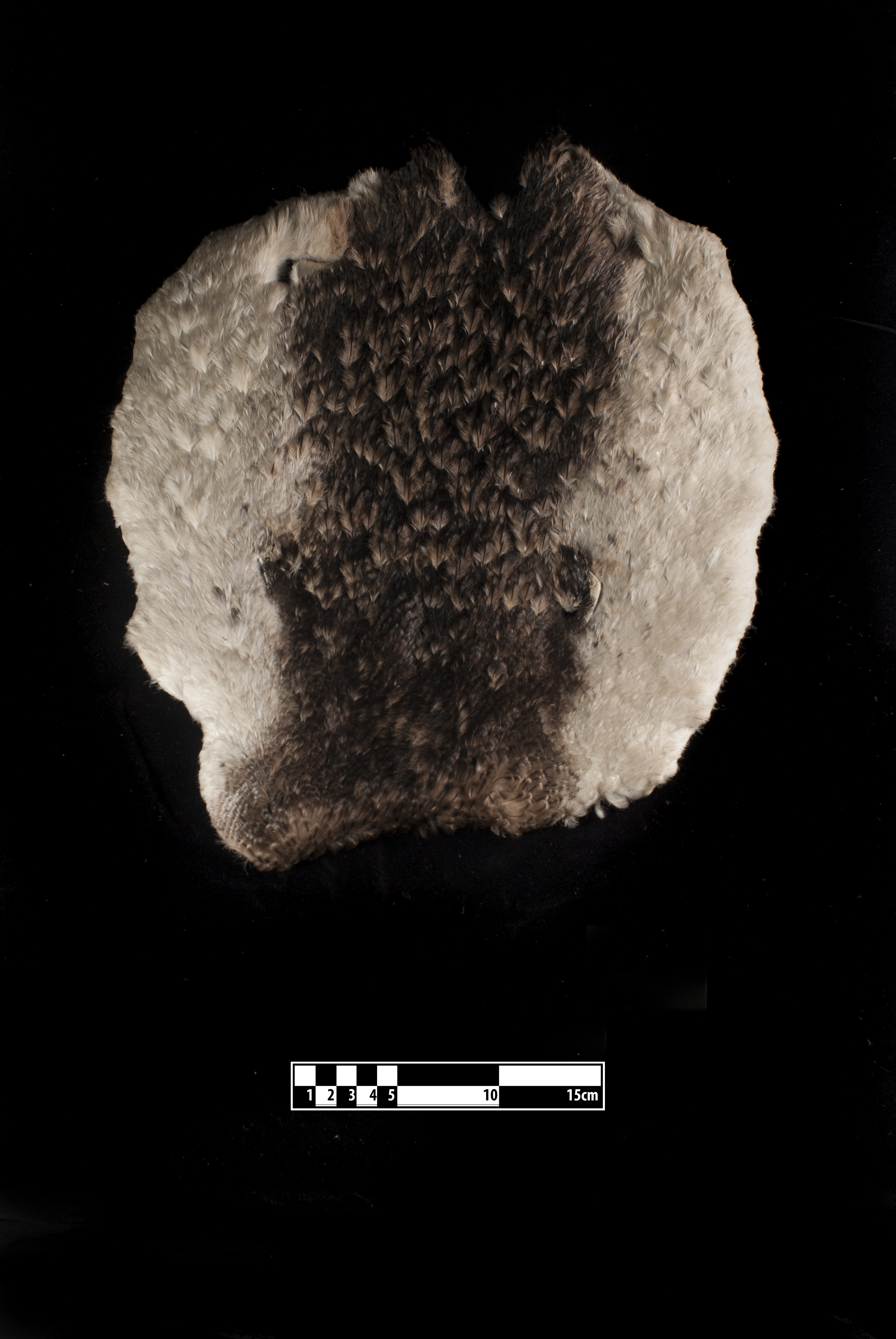
Taxidermized penguin skin

Penguins are superbly adapted to aquatic life. Their wings have evolved to become flippers, useless for flight in the air. In the water, however, penguins are astonishingly agile. Penguins' swimming looks very similar to birds' flight in the air. Within the smooth plumage a layer of air is preserved, ensuring buoyancy. The air layer also helps insulate the birds in cold waters. On land, penguins use their tails and wings to maintain balance for their upright stance.

All penguins are countershaded for camouflage – that is, they have black backs and wings with white fronts. A predator looking up from below (such as an orca or a leopard seal) has difficulty distinguishing between a white penguin belly and the reflective water surface. The dark plumage on their backs camouflages them from above.

Gentoo penguins are the fastest underwater birds in the world. They are capable of reaching speeds up to 36 km (about 22 miles) per hour while searching for food or escaping from predators. They are also able to dive to depths of 170–200 meters (about 560–660 feet). The small penguins do not usually dive deep; they catch their prey near the surface in dives that normally last only one or two minutes. Larger penguins can dive deep in case of need. Emperor penguins are the world's deepest-diving birds. They can dive to depths of approximately 550 meters (1,800 feet) while searching for food.

Penguins either waddle on their feet or slide on their bellies across the snow while using their feet to propel and steer themselves, a movement called "tobogganing", which conserves energy while moving quickly. They also jump with both feet together if they want to move more quickly or cross steep or rocky terrain.

Penguins have an average sense of hearing for birds; this is used by parents and chicks to locate one another in crowded colonies. Their eyes are adapted for underwater vision and are their primary means of locating prey and avoiding predators; in air it has been suggested that they are nearsighted, although research has not supported this hypothesis.

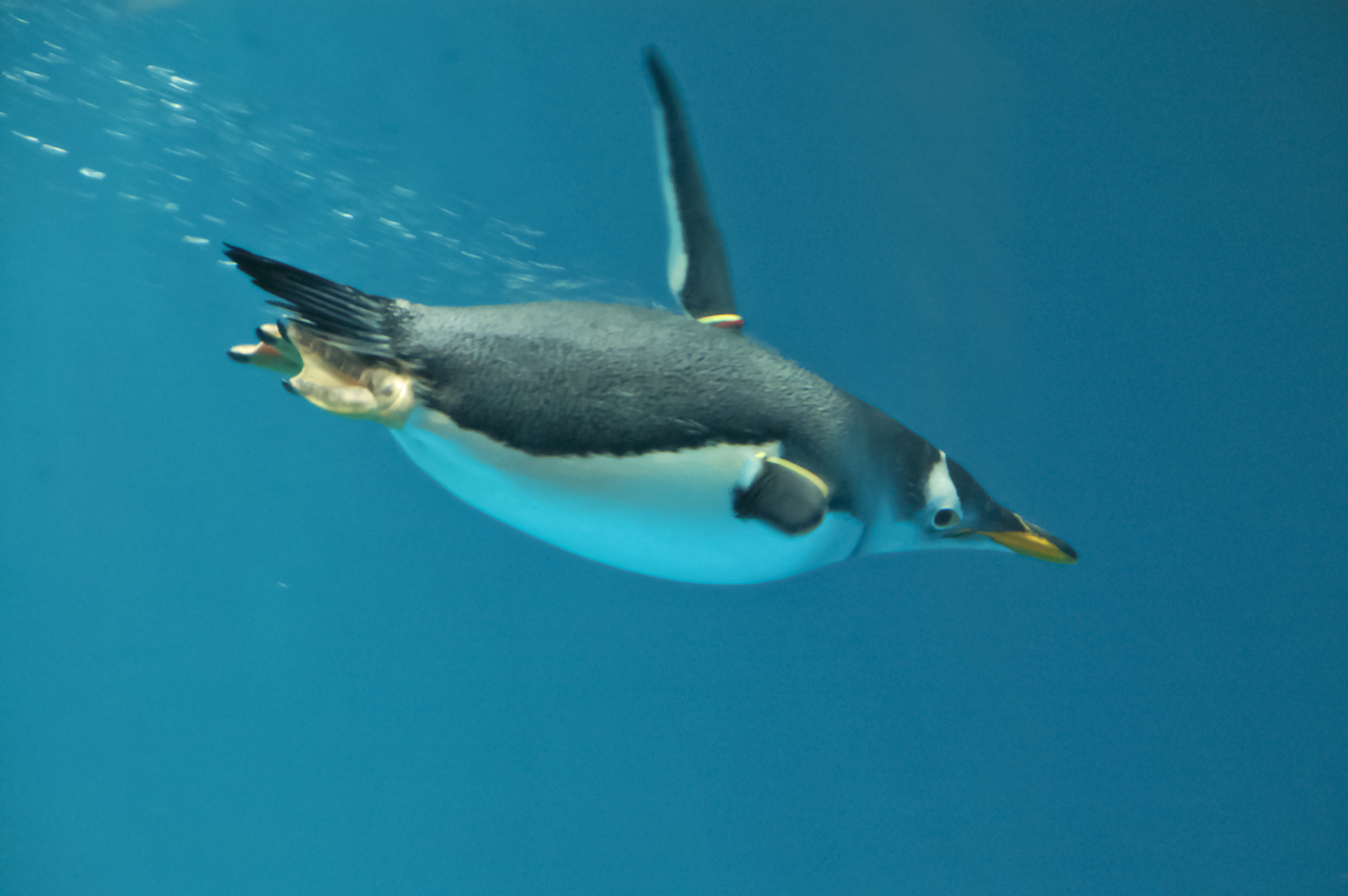
Gentoo penguin swimming underwater at the Nagasaki Penguin Aquarium

Penguins have a thick layer of insulating feathers that keeps them warm in water (heat loss in water is much greater than in air). The emperor penguin has a maximum feather density of about nine feathers per square centimeter which is actually much lower than other birds that live in Antarctic environments. However, they have been identified as having at least four different types of feather: in addition to the traditional feather, the emperor has afterfeathers, plumules, and filoplumes. The afterfeathers are downy plumes that attach directly to the main feathers and were once thought to account for the bird's ability to conserve heat when under water; the plumules are small down feathers that attach directly to the skin, and are much more dense in penguins than other birds; lastly the filoplumes are small (less than 1 cm long) naked shafts that end in a splay of fibers— filoplumes were thought to give flying birds a sense of where their plumage was and whether or not it needed preening, so their presence in penguins may seem inconsistent, but penguins also preen extensively.

The emperor penguin has the largest body mass of all penguins, which further reduces relative surface area and heat loss. They also are able to control blood flow to their extremities, reducing the amount of blood that gets cold, but still keeping the extremities from freezing. In the extreme cold of the Antarctic winter, the females are at sea fishing for food, leaving the males to brave the weather by themselves. They often huddle together to keep warm and rotate positions to make sure that each penguin gets a turn in the centre of the heat pack.

Calculations of the heat loss and retention ability of marine endotherms suggest that most extant penguins are too small to survive in such cold environments. In 2007, Thomas and Fordyce wrote about the "heterothermic loophole" that penguins utilize in order to survive in Antarctica. All extant penguins, even those that live in warmer climates, have a counter-current heat exchanger called the humeral plexus. The flippers of penguins have at least three branches of the axillary artery, which allows cold blood to be heated by blood that has already been warmed and limits heat loss from the flippers. This system allows penguins to efficiently use their body heat and explains why such small animals can survive in the extreme cold.

They can drink salt water because their supraorbital gland filters excess salt from the bloodstream. The salt is excreted in a concentrated fluid from the nasal passages.

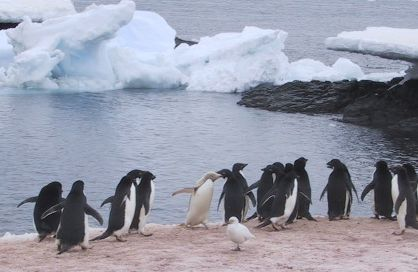
An isabelline Adélie penguin on Gourdin Island

Around one in 50,000 penguins (of most species) are born with brown rather than black plumage. These are called isabelline penguins. Isabellinism is different from albinism. Isabelline penguins tend to live shorter lives than normal penguins, as they are not well-camouflaged against the deep and are often passed over as mates.

== Behaviour ==
Chinstrap penguins in Antarctica

=== Breeding ===
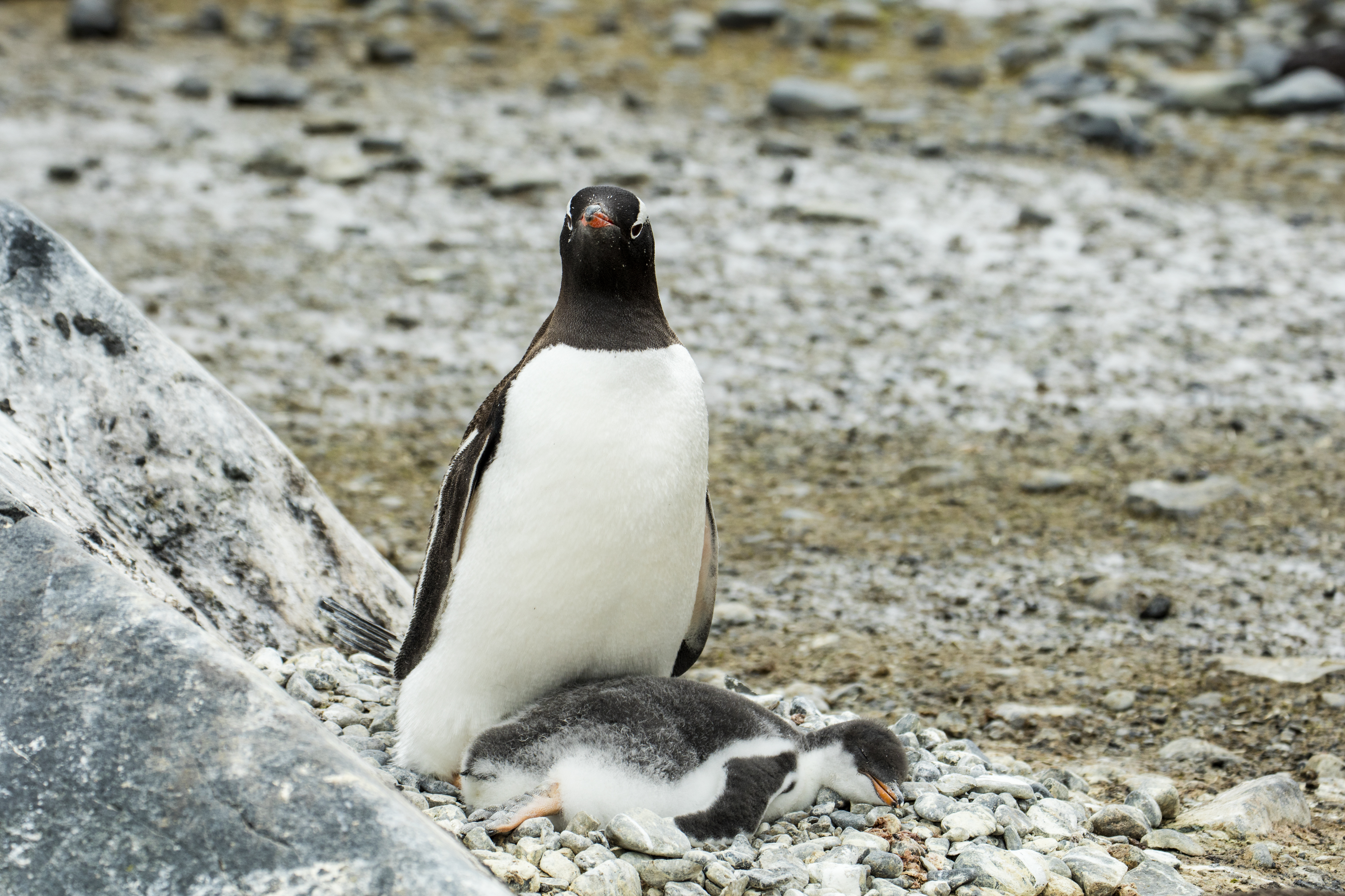
Gentoo penguin watching over a sleeping chick at Brown Bluff

Penguins for the most part breed in large colonies, the exceptions being the yellow-eyed and Fiordland species; these colonies may range in size from as few as 100 pairs for gentoo penguins to several hundred thousand in the case of king, macaroni and chinstrap penguins. Living in colonies results in a high level of social interaction between birds, which has led to a large repertoire of visual as well as vocal displays in all penguin species. Agonistic displays are those intended to confront or drive off, or alternately appease and avoid conflict with, other individuals.

Penguins form monogamous pairs for a breeding season, though the rate the same pair recouples varies drastically. Most penguins lay two eggs in a clutch, although the two largest species, the emperor and the king penguins, lay only one. With the exception of the emperor penguin, where the male does it all, all penguins share the incubation duties. These incubation shifts can last days and even weeks as one member of the pair feeds at sea.

Penguins generally only lay one brood per year; the exception is the little penguin, which can raise two or three broods in a season.

Penguin eggs are smaller than any other bird species when compared proportionally to the weight of the parent birds; at 52 g (2 oz), the little penguin egg is 4.7% of its mothers' weight, and the 450 g (1 lb) emperor penguin egg is 2.3%. The relatively thick shell forms between 10 and 16% of the weight of a penguin egg, presumably to reduce the effects of dehydration and to minimize the risk of breakage in an adverse nesting environment. The yolk, too, is large and comprises 22–31% of the egg. Some yolk often remains when a chick is born, and is thought to help sustain the chick if the parents are delayed in returning with food.

When emperor penguin mothers lose a chick, they sometimes attempt to "steal" another mother's chick, usually unsuccessfully as other females in the vicinity assist the defending mother in keeping her chick. In some species, such as emperor and king penguins, the chicks assemble in large groups called crèches.

== Distribution and habitat ==
Although almost all penguin species are native to the Southern Hemisphere, they are not found only in cold climates, such as Antarctica. In fact, only a few species of penguin actually live so far south. Several species live in the temperate zone; one, the Galápagos penguin, lives as far north as the Galápagos Islands, but this is only made possible by the cold, rich waters of the Antarctic Humboldt Current that flows around these islands. Also, though the climate of the Arctic and Antarctic regions is similar, there are no penguins found in the Arctic.

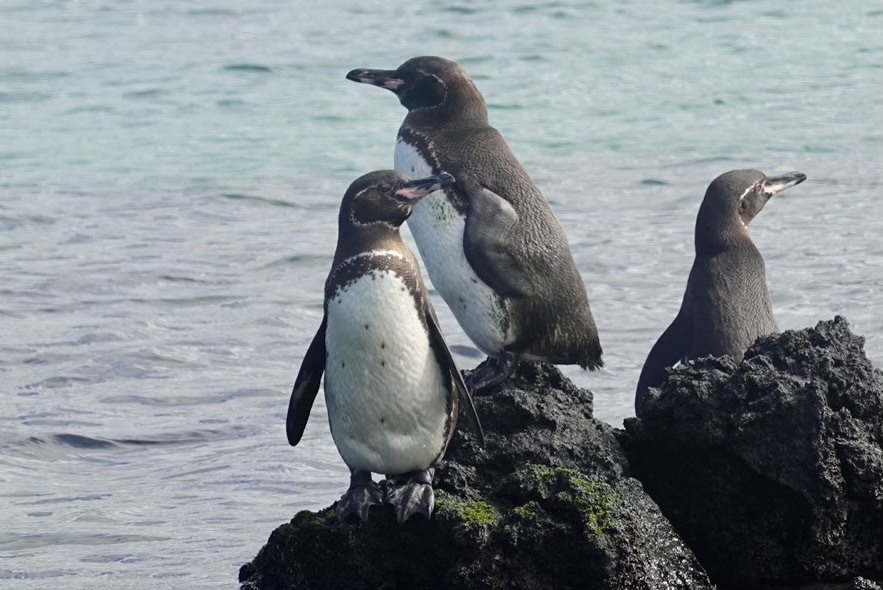
Gálapagos Penguins near Isabela Island

Several authors have suggested that penguins are a good example of Bergmann's Rule where larger-bodied populations live at higher latitudes than smaller-bodied populations. There is some disagreement about this and several other authors have noted that there are fossil penguin species that contradict this hypothesis and that ocean currents and upwellings are likely to have had a greater effect on species diversity than latitude alone.

Major populations of penguins are found in Angola, Antarctica, Argentina, Australia, Chile, Namibia, New Zealand, and South Africa. Satellite images and photos released in 2018 show the population of 2 million in France's remote Ile aux Cochons has collapsed, with barely 200,000 remaining, according to a study published in Antarctic Science.

=== Conservation status ===
The majority of living penguin species have declining populations. According to the IUCN Red List, their conservation statuses range from Least Concern through Critically Endangered.

Species	IUCN Red List Status	Trend	Mature individuals	Last assessment
Emperor penguin, Aptenodytes forsteri	Endangered	Decreasing	Unknown	2026
King penguin, Aptenodytes patagonicus	Least Concern	Increasing		2020
Little penguin, Eudyptula minor	Least Concern	Stable	469,760	2020
Southern rockhopper penguin, Eudyptes chrysocome	Vulnerable	Decreasing	2,500,000	2020
Macaroni penguin, Eudyptes chrysolophus	Vulnerable	Decreasing		2020
Northern rockhopper penguin, Eudyptes moseleyi	Endangered	Decreasing	413,700	2020
Fiordland penguin, Eudyptes pachyrhynchus	Vulnerable	Decreasing	12,500–50,000	2020
Snares penguin, Eudyptes robustus	Vulnerable	Stable	63,000	2018
Royal penguin, Eudyptes schlegeli (disputed)	Least Concern	Unknown	1,340,000–1,660,000 (best estimate: 1,500,000)	2021
Erect-crested penguin, Eudyptes sclateri	Endangered	Decreasing	150,000	2020
Yellow-eyed penguin, Megadyptes antipodes	Endangered	Decreasing	2,600–3,000	2020
Adélie penguin, Pygoscelis adeliae	Least Concern	Increasing	10,000,000	2020
Chinstrap penguin, Pygoscelis antarcticus	Least Concern	Decreasing	8,000,000	2020
Gentoo penguin, Pygoscelis papua	Least Concern	Stable	774,000	2019
African penguin, Spheniscus demersus	Critically Endangered	Decreasing	19,800	2024
Humboldt penguin, Spheniscus humboldti	Vulnerable	Decreasing	23,800	2020
Magellanic penguin, Spheniscus magellanicus	Least Concern	Decreasing	2,200,000–3,200,000	2020
Galápagos penguin, Spheniscus mendiculus	Endangered	Decreasing	1,200	2020

== Penguins and humans ==
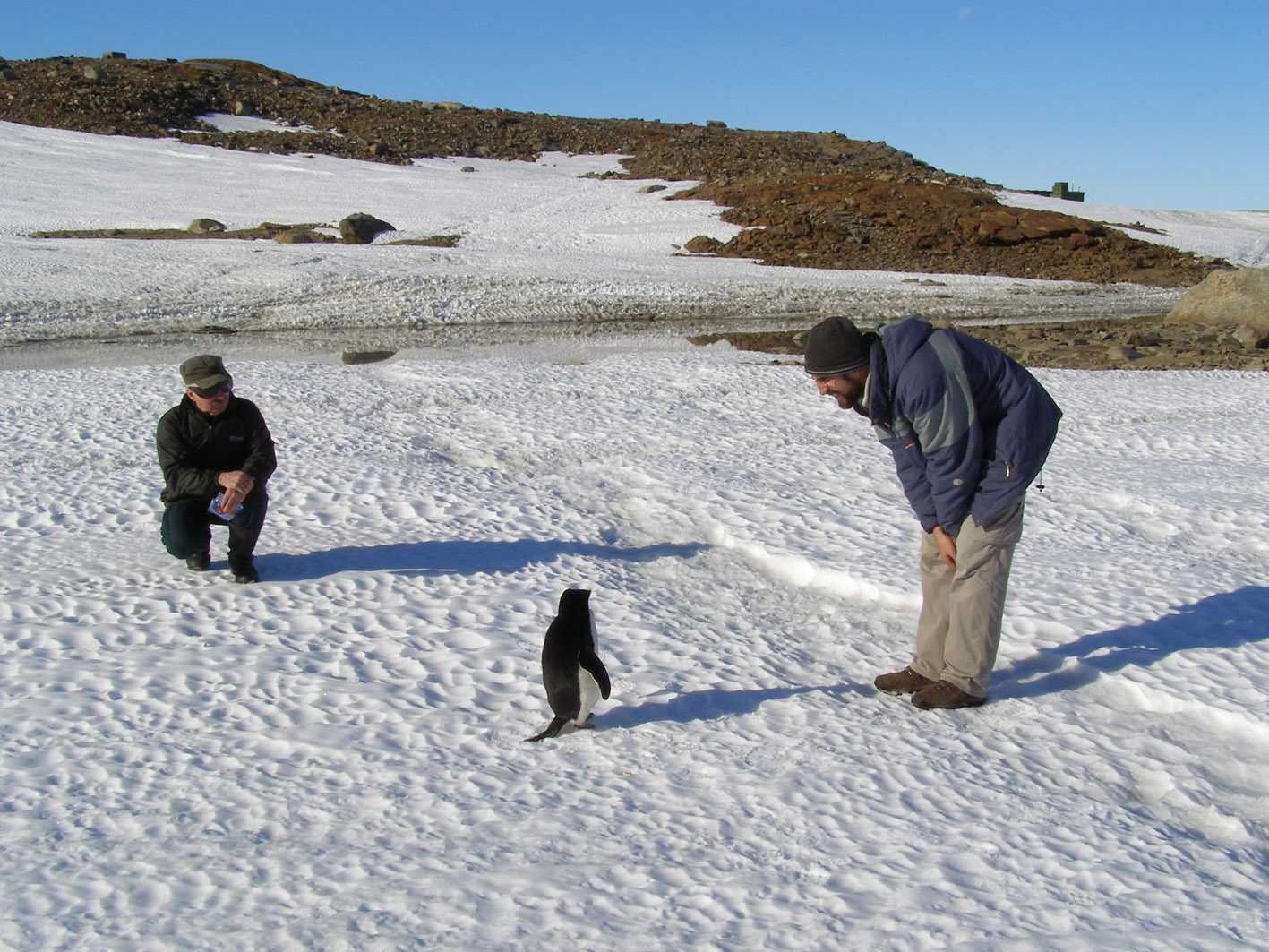
An Adélie penguin (center) encountering humans during the Antarctic summer

Penguins have no special fear of humans and will often approach groups of people. This is probably because penguins have no land predators in Antarctica or the nearby offshore islands. They are preyed upon by other birds like skuas, especially in eggs and as fledglings. Other birds like petrels, sheathbills, and gulls also eat the chicks. Dogs preyed upon penguins while they were allowed in Antarctica during the age of early human exploration as sled dogs, but dogs have long since been banned from Antarctica. Instead, adult penguins are at risk at sea from predators such as sharks, orcas, and leopard seals. Typically, penguins do not approach closer than around 9 feet (2.7 meters), at which point they appear to become nervous.

In June 2011, an emperor penguin came ashore on New Zealand's Peka Peka Beach, 3,200 kilometres (2,000 mi) off course on its journey to Antarctica. Nicknamed Happy Feet, after the film of the same name, it was suffering from heat exhaustion and had to undergo a number of operations to remove objects like driftwood and sand from its stomach. Happy Feet was a media sensation, with extensive coverage on TV and the web, including a live stream that had thousands of views and a visit from English actor Stephen Fry. Once he had recovered, Happy Feet was released back into the water south of New Zealand.

=== In popular culture ===
Tux, the mascot of the Linux kernel

Penguins are widely considered endearing for their unusually upright, waddling gait, swimming ability and (compared to other birds) lack of fear of humans. Their black-and-white plumage is often likened to a white tie suit. Some writers and artists have penguins based at the North Pole, but there are no wild penguins in the Arctic. The cartoon series Chilly Willy helped perpetuate this myth, as the title penguin would interact with Arctic or sub-Arctic species, such as polar bears and walruses.

Penguins have been the subject of many books and films, such as Happy Feet, Surf's Up and Penguins of Madagascar, all CGI films; March of the Penguins, a documentary based on the migration process of the emperor penguin; and Farce of the Penguins, a parody of the documentary. Mr. Popper's Penguins is a children's book written by Richard and Florence Atwater; it was named a Newbery Honor Book in 1939. Penguins have also appeared in a number of cartoons and television dramas, including Pingu, co-created by Otmar Gutmann and Erika Brueggemann in 1990 and covering more than 100 short episodes. At the end of 2009, Entertainment Weekly put it on its end-of-the-decade "best-of" list, saying, "Whether they were walking (March of the Penguins), dancing (Happy Feet), or hanging ten (Surf's Up), these oddly adorable birds took flight at the box office all decade long."

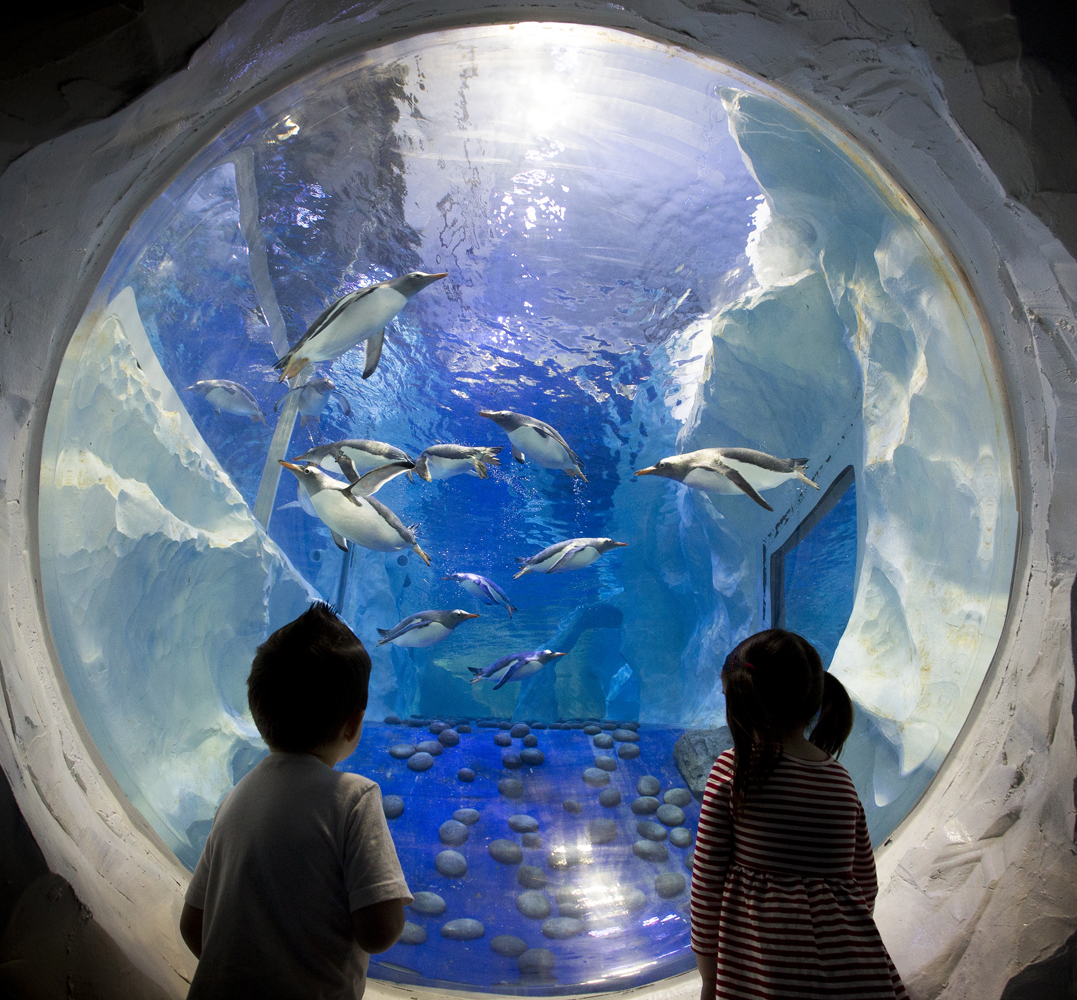
Children watching penguins swim

A video game called Pengo was released by Sega in 1982. Set in Antarctica, the player controls a penguin character who must navigate mazes of ice cubes. The player is rewarded with cut-scenes of animated penguins marching, dancing, saluting and playing peekaboo. Several remakes and enhanced editions have followed, most recently in 2012. Penguins are also sometimes depicted in music.

In 1941, DC Comics introduced the avian-themed character of the Penguin as a supervillain adversary of the superhero Batman (Detective Comics #58). He became one of the most enduring enemies in Batman's rogues gallery. In the 60s Batman TV series, as played by Burgess Meredith, he was one of the most popular characters, and in Tim Burton's reimagining of the story, the character played by Danny Devito in the 1992 film Batman Returns, employed an actual army of penguins (mostly African penguins and king penguins).

Several pro, minor, college and high school sport teams in the United States have named themselves after the species, including the Pittsburgh Penguins team in the National Hockey League and the Youngstown State Penguins in college athletics.

Penguins featured regularly in the cartoons of U.K. cartoonist Steve Bell in his strip in The Guardian newspaper, particularly during and following the Falklands War. Opus the Penguin, from the cartoons of Berkeley Breathed, is also described as hailing from the Falklands. Opus was a comical, "existentialist" penguin character in the cartoons Bloom County, Outland and Opus. He was also the star in the animated Christmas TV special A Wish for Wings That Work.

In the mid-2000s, penguins became one of the most publicized species of animals that form lasting homosexual couples. A children's book, And Tango Makes Three, was written about one such penguin family in the New York Zoo.

== Bibliography ==
- Williams; Tony D. (1995). The Penguins – Spheniscidae. Oxford: Oxford University Press. ISBN 978-0-19-854667-2.
