= Waipara River (Canterbury) =

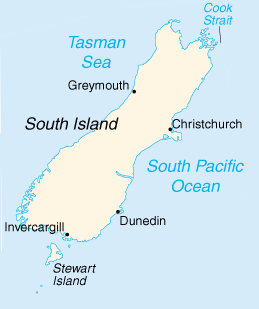

Location
- Country: New Zealand
- Region: Canterbury
- District: Hurunui

Physical characteristics
- Mouth
  - location: Pegasus Bay
  - coordinates: 43°09′06″S 172°47′59″E
- Length: 40 kilometres (25 mi)
- Basin size: 726 square kilometres (280 mi^{2})

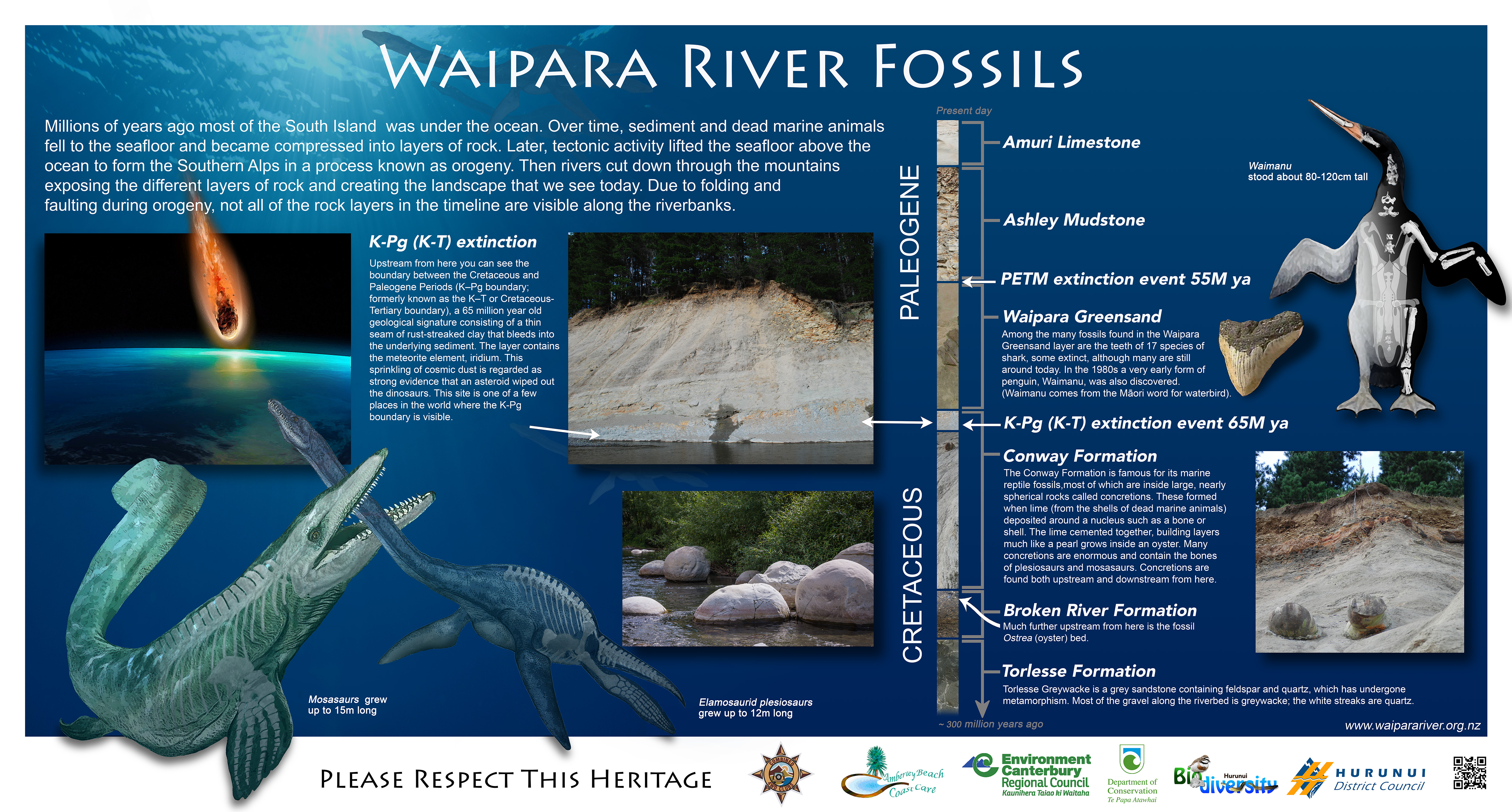
Waipara River Fossils New Zealand

The Waipara River is a river in Canterbury in the South Island of New Zealand. The river is about 40 kilometres (25 mi) long, and its catchment area is 726 square kilometres (280 mi^{2}).

The river passes through the small town of Waipara on its 45-kilometre (28 mi) southeastward journey to the Pacific Ocean at the northern end of Pegasus Bay near Amberley.

== See also ==
- List of rivers of New Zealand
