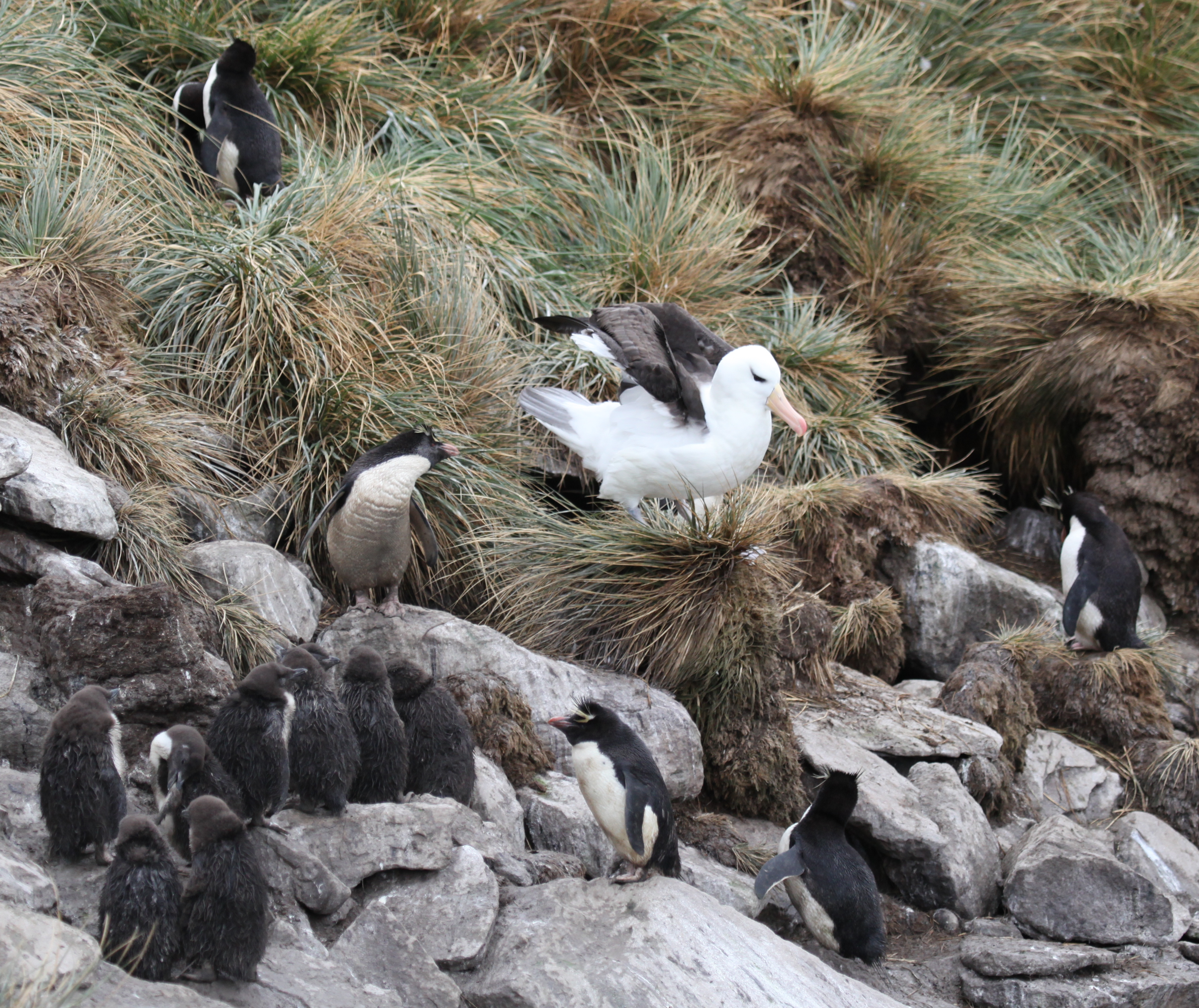
- Black-browed albatross (Thalassarche melanophris) and southern rockhopper penguins (Eudyptes chrysocome)

Scientific classification
- Domain: Eukaryota
- Kingdom: Animalia
- Phylum: Chordata
- Class: Aves
- Clade: Aequornithes
- Clade: Austrodyptornithes; Yuri et al., 2013

Orders
- Sphenisciformes; Procellariiformes

Synonyms
- Procellariimorphae

= Austrodyptornithes =

Austrodyptornithes Temporal range: Paleocene-recent, 62–0 Ma

Clade of birds

Austrodyptornithes is a clade of birds that include the orders Sphenisciformes (penguins) and Procellariiformes (tube-nosed seabirds). A 2014 analysis of whole genomes of 48 representative bird species concluded that penguins are the sister group of Procellariiformes, from which they diverged about 60 million years ago.

- Austrodyptornithes
  - Sphenisciformes
    Spheniscidae (penguins)
  - Procellariiformes (tube‑nosed seabirds)
    - Diomedeidae (albatrosses)
    - - Oceanitidae (Austral or southern storm petrels)
      - - Hydrobatidae (northern storm petrels)
        - - Pelecanoididae (diving petrels)
          - Procellariidae (fulmarine petrels, gadfly petrels, prions, shearwaters)
