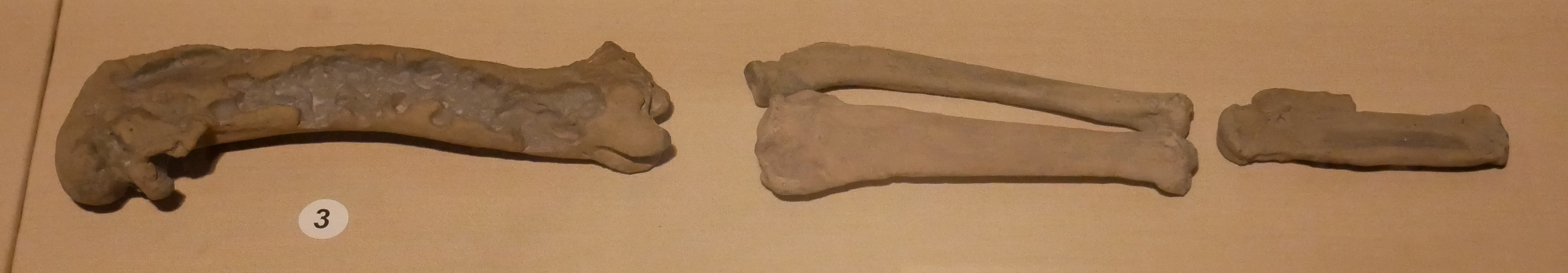
- Wing bones of the holotype

Scientific classification
- Kingdom: Animalia
- Phylum: Chordata
- Class: Aves
- Order: Sphenisciformes
- Genus: †Sequiwaimanu; Mayr et al., 2018
- Species: †S. rosieae

Binomial name
- †Sequiwaimanu rosieae Mayr et al., 2018

= Sequiwaimanu =

Sequiwaimanu Temporal range: Paleocene, 58 Ma

Extinct genus of birds

Sequiwaimanu (meaning "to follow Waimanu") is an extinct genus of early penguin from the Waipara Greensand of New Zealand. The type species, S. rosieae, was named and described by Gerald Mayr in 2018.

== Discovery and naming ==
The holotype is CM 2016.6.1, and Sequiwaimanu is the fourth penguin species to be discovered from the Waipara Greensand in New Zealand, which originally held two species that were assigned to the taxon Waimanu. The specimen was discovered within Claremont Estate, which was owned by Richard Goord at the time of its discovery.

Sequiwaimanu rosieae was named and described by Mayr et al. (2018).

== Description ==
Sequiwaimanu had leg bones similar to an unnamed giant penguin.

== See also ==
- 2018 in paleontology
- Muriwaimanu
