= Muriwaimanu =

Muriwaimanu Temporal range: Paleocene, ~61.6–58 Ma

Scientific classification
- Kingdom: Animalia
- Phylum: Chordata
- Class: Aves
- Order: Sphenisciformes
- Genus: †Muriwaimanu; Mayr et al., 2018
- Species: †M. tuatahi

Binomial name
- †Muriwaimanu tuatahi Mayr et al., 2018

Synonyms
- Waimanu tuatahi Slack et al., 2006

Extinct genus of birds

Muriwaimanu is an extinct genus of early penguin from the Paleocene Waipara Greensand of New Zealand. Only the type species M. tuatahi is known.

== Etymology ==
The name Muriwaimanu comes from muri, Māori for "after", and Waimanu, referring to the fact that the fossils come from younger strata than Waimanu.

== Discovery and naming ==
The holotype was discovered in 1980 within the Waipara Greensand near the Waipara River, in Canterbury, New Zealand, and it was initially named Waimanu tuatahi by Slack et al. (2006). Mayr et al. (2018) re-examined the specimen and determined that it belonged to a separate genus, creating the species Muriwaimanu tuatahi.

A second specimen from the Waipara Greensand (CM 2018.124.4), consisting of a partial specimen preserved within two blocks of sandstone, was discovered by Leigh Love in 2017 and was described by Mayr et al. (2020). These researchers identified the specimen as belonging to cf. Muriwaimanu tuatahi. However, later research published by Mayr et al. (2025) assigned this specimen to a new genus and species, Waimanutaha kenlovei, based on phylogenetic separation and proportional differences. In the same publication, the researchers also described specimen UC 22078, which includes a skull, partial mandible, and much of the skeleton, and other specimens referrable to Muriwaimanu.

== Description ==
Muriwaimanu exhibited a long, narrow beak and paddle-shaped wings, and the fossilized remains also indicate it may have kept their wings in a flexed position during downward strokes, unlike modern penguins whose wings are kept extended, suggesting that Muriwaimanu may be a transition species for modern Antarctic penguins.

== See also ==
- 2018 in paleontology
- Sequiwaimanu
