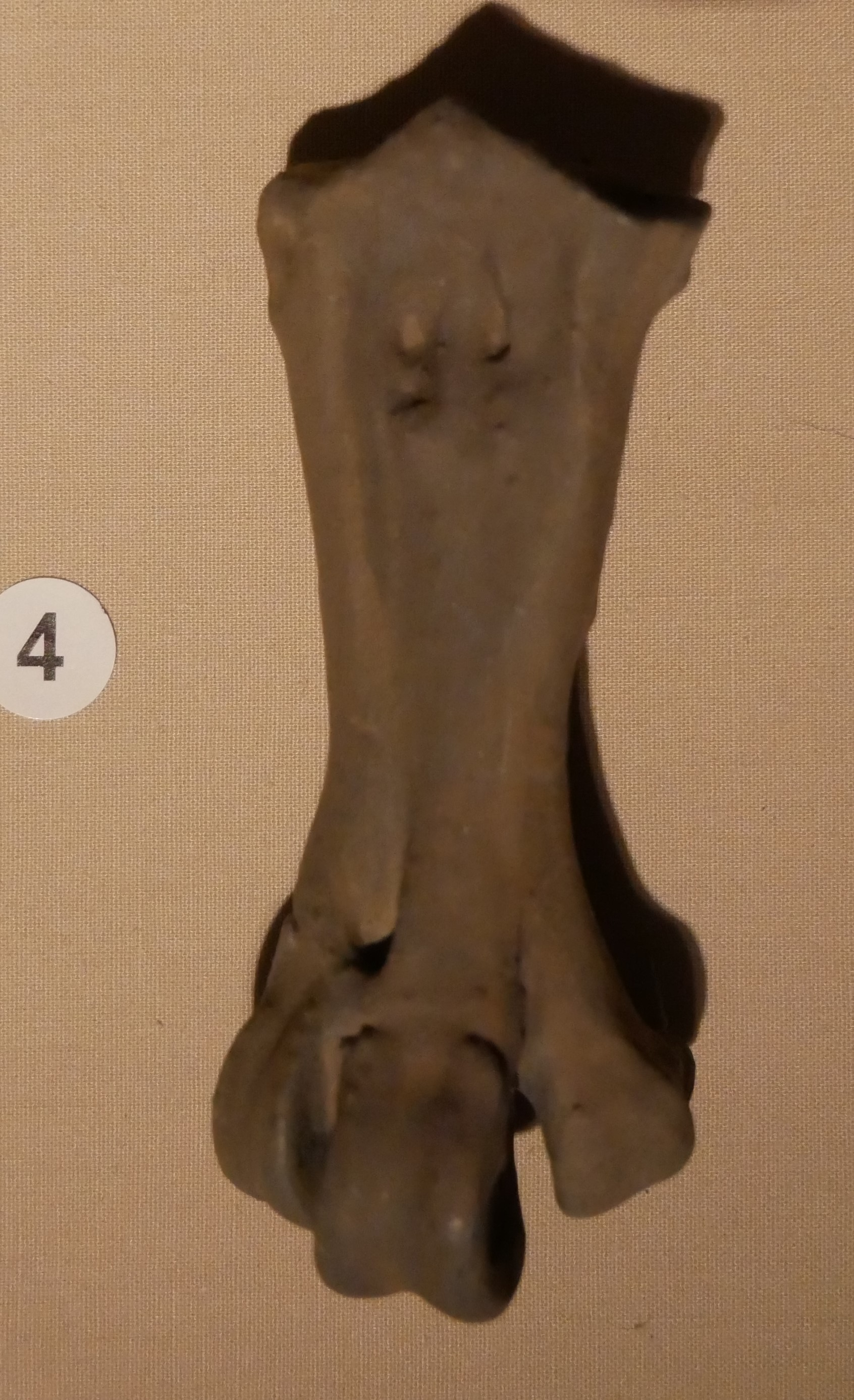
- Tarsometatarsus of the holotype

Scientific classification
- Kingdom: Animalia
- Phylum: Chordata
- Class: Aves
- Order: Sphenisciformes
- Genus: †Waimanu; Slack et al. 2006

Type species
- †Waimanu manneringi Slack et al. 2006

= Waimanu =

Waimanu Temporal range: Paleocene, 62–60 Ma

Extinct genus of birds

Waimanu is a genus of early penguin which lived during the Paleocene, soon after the Cretaceous–Paleogene extinction event, around 62–60 million years ago. It was about the size of an emperor penguin (1 metre (3.3 ft)). It is one of the most important bird fossils for understanding the origin and evolution of birds because of the time period it comes from, and the position of penguins near the base of the bird family tree.

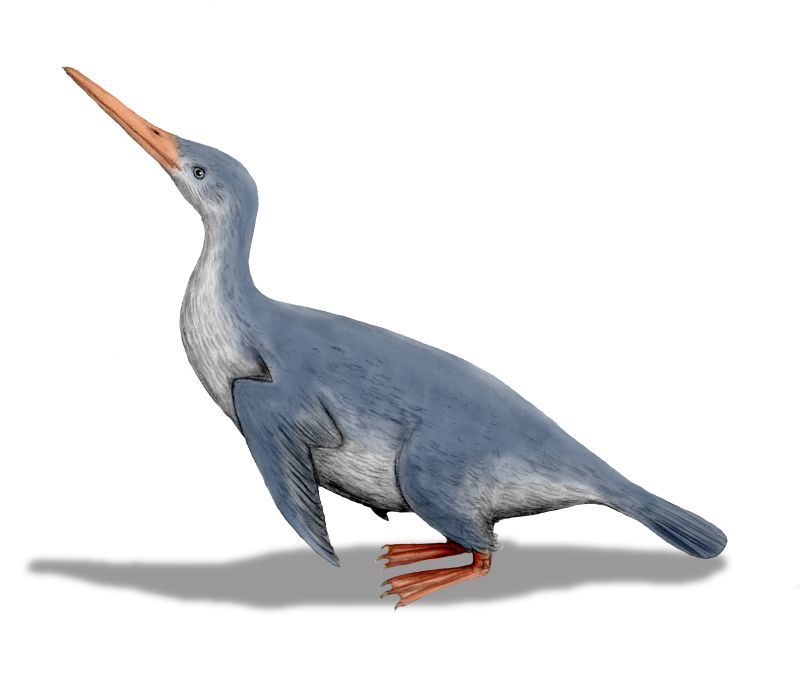
Artist's reconstruction

Waimanu was a very early member of the Sphenisciformes, the order that includes modern penguins. However, although it was probably flightless like all modern penguins, with wings specialized for wing-propelled diving, its wing bones do not yet show the extreme specializations modern penguins have for an aquatic lifestyle. It may have resembled a flightless loon or diver in body shape, and possibly the great auk in its manner of locomotion.

== Discovery ==
Waimanu was discovered in the Basal Waipara Greensand near the Waipara River, in Canterbury, New Zealand, in 1980.

The holotype is a partial skeleton consisting of an almost complete right tibiotarsus, a proximal half of the right fibula, a right tarsometatarsus, a right pelvis, a synsacrum (with the last thoracic vertebra attached to the synsacrum), and four caudal vertebrae. It is held in the Canterbury Museum in Christchurch, New Zealand.

== Etymology ==
The genus name Waimanu comes from the Māori wai for "water" and manu for "bird". One species is known, W. manneringi, named for Al Mannering who found and collected the holotype specimen. A second species, Waimanu tuatahi, was moved to Muriwaimanu in 2018.

== Significance ==
The discovery of Waimanu provided evidence for debate about whether the radiation of modern birds, Neoaves, took place before the extinction of the non-avian dinosaurs or extremely rapidly immediately after. DNA studies, combined with the fossil evidence, seem to indicate the latter.
