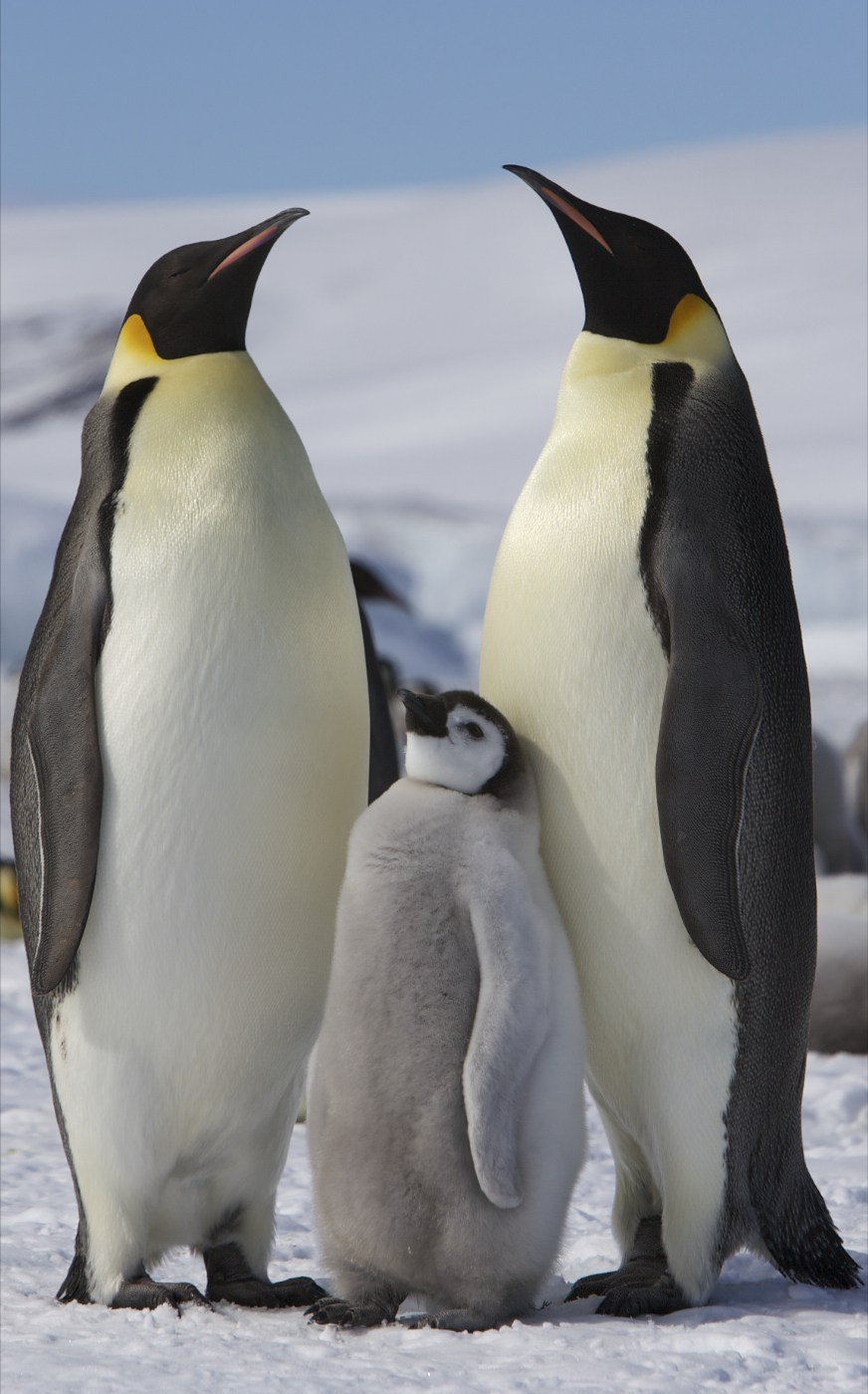
- Adults with a chick on Snow Hill Island, Antarctic Peninsula

Conservation status
- Near Threatened (IUCN 3.1)

Scientific classification
- Kingdom: Animalia
- Phylum: Chordata
- Class: Aves
- Order: Sphenisciformes
- Family: Spheniscidae
- Genus: Aptenodytes
- Species: A. forsteri

Binomial name
- Aptenodytes forsteri Gray, 1844

= Emperor penguin =

Large flightless seabird endemic to Antarctica

The emperor penguin (Aptenodytes forsteri) is the tallest and heaviest of all living penguin species and is endemic to Antarctica. The male and female are similar in plumage and size, reaching 100 cm (39 in) in length and weighing from 22 to 45 kg (49 to 99 lb). Feathers of the head and back are black and sharply delineated from the white belly, pale-yellow breast and bright-yellow ear patches.

Like all species of penguin, the emperor is flightless, with a streamlined body, and wings stiffened and flattened into flippers for a marine habitat. Its diet consists primarily of fish, but also includes crustaceans, such as krill, and cephalopods, such as squid. While hunting, the species can remain submerged around 20 minutes, diving to a depth of 535 m (1,755 ft). It has several adaptations to facilitate this, including an unusually structured haemoglobin to allow it to function at low oxygen levels, solid bones to reduce barotrauma, and the ability to reduce its metabolism and shut down non-essential organ functions.

The only penguin species that breeds during the Antarctic winter, emperor penguins trek 50–120 km (31–75 mi) over the ice to breeding colonies which can contain up to several thousand individuals. The female lays a single egg, which is incubated for just over two months by the male while the female returns to the sea to feed; parents subsequently take turns foraging at sea and caring for their chick in the colony. The lifespan of an emperor penguin is typically 20 years in the wild, although observations suggest that some individuals may live as long as 50 years of age.

== Taxonomy ==
Emperor penguins were described in 1844 by English zoologist George Robert Gray, who created the generic name from Ancient Greek word elements, ἀ-πτηνο-δύτης [a-ptēno-dytēs], "without-wings-diver". Its specific name is in honour of the German naturalist Johann Reinhold Forster, who accompanied Captain James Cook on his second voyage and officially named five other penguin species. Forster may have been the first person to see emperor penguins in 1773–74, when he recorded a sighting of what he believed was the similar king penguin (A. patagonicus) but, given the location, may very well have been the emperor penguin (A. forsteri).

Together with the king penguin, the emperor penguin is one of two extant species in the genus Aptenodytes. Fossil evidence of a third species—Ridgen's penguin (A. ridgeni)—has been found from the late Pliocene, about three million years ago, in New Zealand. Studies of penguin behaviour and genetics have proposed that the genus Aptenodytes is basal; in other words, that it split off from a branch which led to all other living penguin species. Mitochondrial and nuclear DNA evidence suggests this split occurred around 40 million years ago.

== Description ==
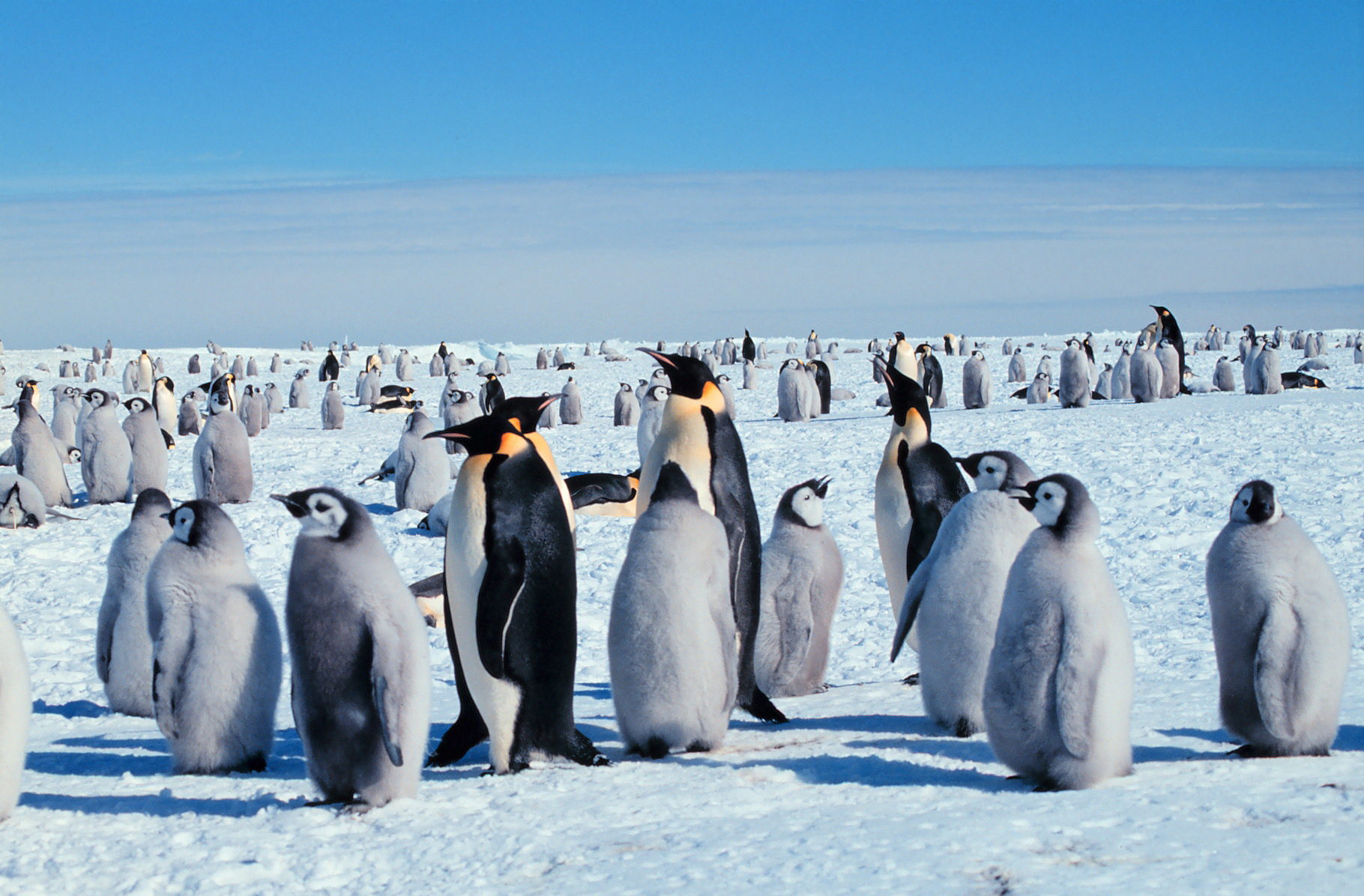
Adults with chicks

Adult emperor penguins are 110–120 cm (43–47 in) in length, averaging 115 cm (45 in) according to Stonehouse (1975). Due to the method of bird measurement that measures length between bill to tail, sometimes body length and standing height are confused, and some reported height even reaching 1.5 m (4 ft 11 in) tall. There are still more than a few papers mentioning that they reach a standing height of 1.2 m (3 ft 11 in) instead of body length. Although standing height of emperor penguin is rarely provided at scientific reports, Prévost (1961) recorded 86 wild individuals and measured maximum height of 1.08 m (3 ft 7 in). Friedman (1945) recorded measurements from 22 wild individuals and resulted height ranging 83–97 cm (33–38 in). Ksepka et al. (2012) measured standing height of 81–94 cm (32–37 in) according to 11 complete skins collected in American Museum of Natural History. The weight ranges from 22.7 to 45.4 kg (50 to 100 lb) and varies by sex, with males weighing more than females. It is the fifth heaviest living bird species, after only the larger varieties of ratite. The weight also varies by season, as both male and female penguins lose substantial mass while raising hatchlings and incubating their egg. Male emperor penguins must withstand the extreme Antarctic winter cold for more than two months while protecting their eggs; eating nothing during this time, male emperors will lose around 12 kg (26 lb) while waiting for their eggs to hatch. Adult birds weigh between 25 kg (55 lb) and 45 kg (99 lb), with weights dropping through the breeding season. Females typically weigh 18 kg (40 lb) less than males.

Like all penguin species, emperor penguins have streamlined bodies to minimise drag while swimming, and wings that are more like stiff, flat flippers. The tongue is equipped with rear-facing barbs to prevent prey from escaping when caught. Males and females are similar in size and colour. The adult has deep black dorsal feathers, covering the head, chin, throat, back, dorsal part of the flippers, and tail. The black plumage is sharply delineated from the light-coloured plumage elsewhere. The underparts of the wings and belly are white, becoming pale yellow in the upper breast, while the ear patches are bright yellow. The upper mandible of the 8 cm (3.1 in) long bill is black, and the lower mandible can be pink, orange or lilac. In juveniles, the auricular patches, chin and throat are white, while its bill is black. Emperor penguin chicks are typically covered with silver-grey down and have black heads and white masks. A chick with all-white plumage was seen in 2001, but was not considered to be an albino as it did not have pink eyes. Chicks weigh around 315 g (11.1 oz) after hatching, and fledge when they reach about 50% of adult weight.

The emperor penguin's dark plumage fades to brown from November until February (the Antarctic summer), before the yearly moult in January and February. Moulting is rapid in this species compared with other birds, taking only around 34 days. Emperor penguin feathers emerge from the skin after they have grown to a third of their total length, and before old feathers are lost, to help reduce heat loss. New feathers then push out the old ones before finishing their growth.

The average yearly survival rate of an adult emperor penguin has been measured at 95.1%, with an average life expectancy of 19.9 years. The same researchers estimated that 1% of emperor penguins hatched could feasibly reach an age of 50 years. In contrast, only 19% of chicks survive their first year of life. Therefore, 80% of the emperor penguin population comprises adults five years and older.

=== Voice ===
Emperor penguins and their chick calling in Antarctica

As the species has no fixed nesting sites that individuals can use to locate their own partner or chick, emperor penguins must rely on vocal sounds alone for identification. They use a complex set of calls that are critical to individual recognition between mates, parents and offspring, displaying the widest variation in individual calls of all penguin species. Calling emperor penguins use two frequency bands simultaneously. Chicks use a frequency-modulated whistle to beg for food and to contact parents.

=== Adaptations to cold ===
The emperor penguin breeds in the coldest environment of any bird species; air temperatures may reach −40 °C (−40 °F), and wind speeds may reach 144 km/h (89 mph). Water temperature is a frigid −1.8 °C (28.8 °F), which is much lower than the emperor penguin's average body temperature of 39 °C (102 °F). The species has adapted in several ways to counteract heat loss. Dense feathers provide 80–90% of its insulation and it has a layer of sub-dermal fat which may be up to 3 cm (1.2 in) thick before breeding. While the density of contour feathers is approximately 9 per square centimetre (58 per square inch), a combination of dense afterfeathers and down feathers (plumules) likely play a critical role for insulation. Muscles allow the feathers to be held erect on land, reducing heat loss by trapping a layer of air next to the skin. Conversely, the plumage is flattened in water, thus waterproofing the skin and the downy underlayer. Preening is vital in facilitating insulation and in keeping the plumage oily and water-repellent.

The emperor penguin is able to thermoregulate (maintain its core body temperature) without altering its metabolism, over a wide range of temperatures. Known as the thermoneutral range, this extends from −10 to 20 °C (14 to 68 °F). Below this temperature range, its metabolic rate increases significantly, although an individual can maintain its core temperature from 38.0 °C (100.4 °F) down to −47 °C (−53 °F). Movement by swimming, walking, and shivering are three mechanisms for increasing metabolism; a fourth process involves an increase in the breakdown of fats by enzymes, which is induced by the hormone glucagon. At temperatures above 20 °C (68 °F), an emperor penguin may become agitated as its body temperature and metabolic rate rise to increase heat loss. Raising its wings and exposing the undersides increases the exposure of its body surface to the air by 16%, facilitating further heat loss.

=== Adaptations to pressure and low oxygen ===
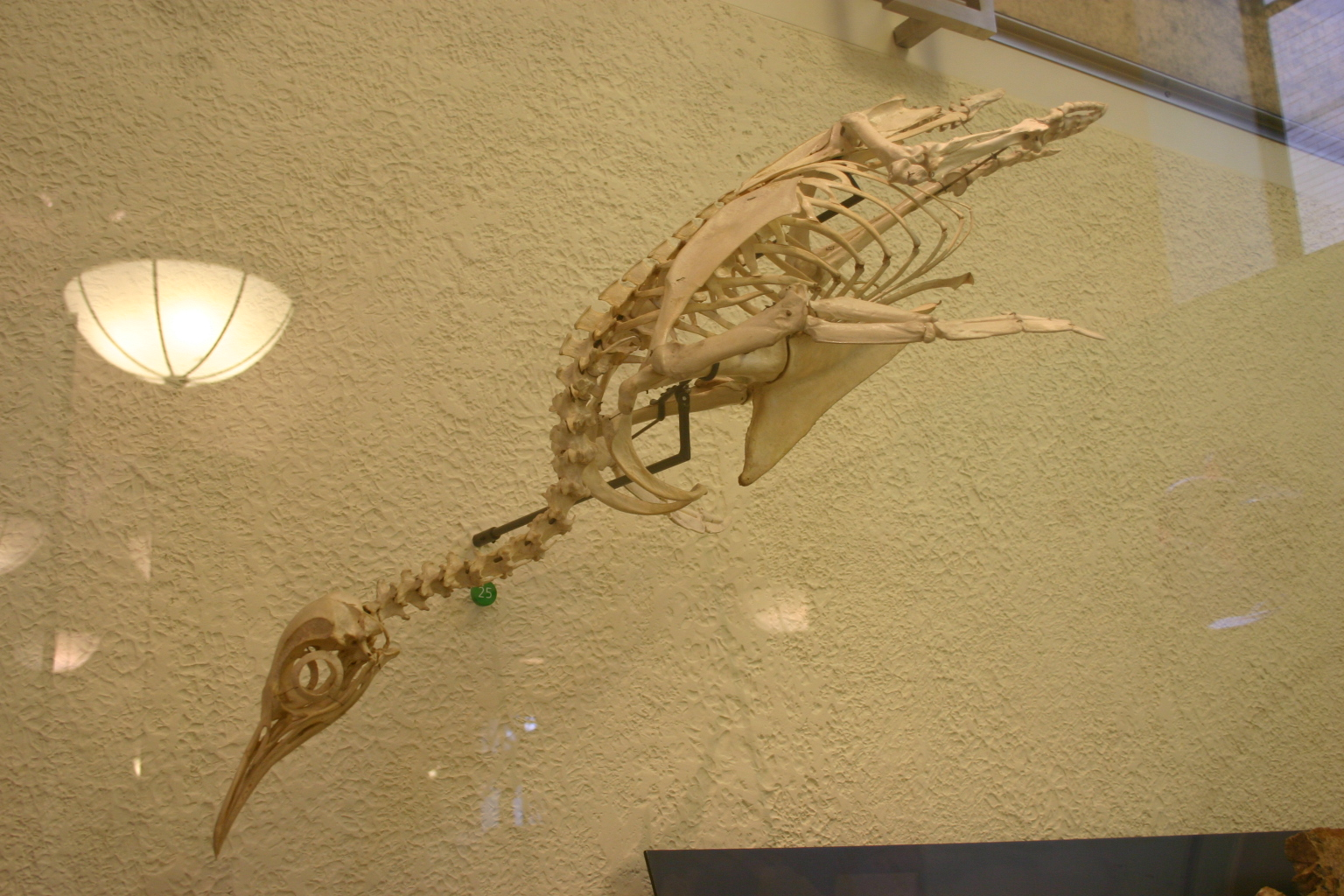
Mounted skeleton at the American Museum of Natural History

In addition to the cold, the emperor penguin encounters another stressful condition on deep dives—markedly increased pressure of up to 40 times that of the surface, which in most other terrestrial organisms would cause barotrauma. The bones of the penguin are solid rather than air-filled, which eliminates the risk of mechanical barotrauma.

While diving, the emperor penguin's oxygen use is markedly reduced, as its heart rate is reduced to as low as 15–20 beats per minute and non-essential organs are shut down, thus facilitating longer dives. Its haemoglobin and myoglobin are able to bind and transport oxygen at low blood concentrations; this allows the bird to function with very low oxygen levels that would otherwise result in loss of consciousness.

== Distribution and habitat ==
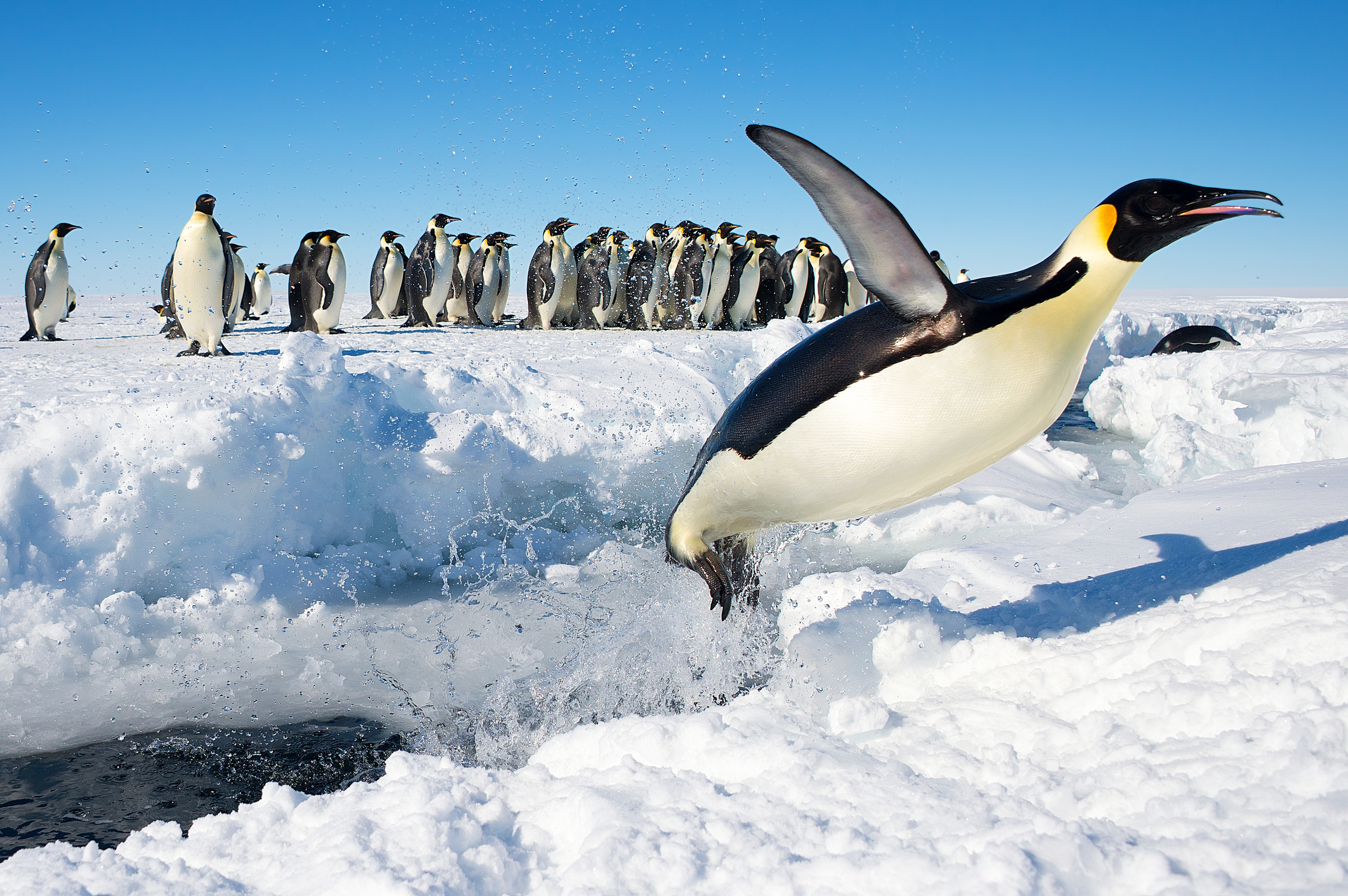
Emperor penguin jumping out of the water in Antarctica

The emperor penguin has a circumpolar distribution in the Antarctic almost exclusively between the 66° and 77° south latitudes. It almost always breeds on stable pack ice near the coast and up to 18 km (11 mi) offshore. Breeding colonies are usually in areas where ice cliffs and icebergs provide some protection from the wind. Three land colonies have been reported: one (now disappeared) on a shingle spit at the Dion Islands on the Antarctic Peninsula, one on a headland at Taylor Glacier in Victoria Land, and most recently one at Amundsen Bay. Since 2009, a number of colonies have been reported on shelf ice rather than sea ice, in some cases moving to the shelf in years when sea ice forms late. As of 2022, there were 66 known breeding colonies.

The northernmost breeding population is on Snow Hill Island, near the northern tip of the Peninsula. Individual vagrants have been seen on Heard Island, South Georgia, and occasionally in New Zealand. The furthest north a vagrant has been recorded was in Denmark, Western Australia in November 2024. This individual, which is believed to have originated from eastern Antarctica, was encountered by a group of surfers shortly after it arrived in Denmark, and was taken in by conservationists at the Department of Biodiversity, Conservation and Attractions to have its condition evaluated.

In 2009, the total population of emperor penguins was estimated to be at around 595,000 adult birds, in 46 known colonies spread around the Antarctic and sub-Antarctic; around 35% of the known population lives north of the Antarctic Circle. Major breeding colonies were located at Cape Washington, Coulman Island in Victoria Land, Halley Bay, Cape Colbeck, and Dibble Glacier. Colonies are known to fluctuate over time, often breaking into "suburbs" which move apart from the parent group, and some have been known to disappear entirely. The Cape Crozier colony on the Ross Sea shrank drastically between the first visits by the Discovery Expedition in 1902–03 and the later visits by the Terra Nova Expedition in 1910–11; it was reduced to a few hundred birds, and may have come close to extinction due to changes in the position of the ice shelf. By the 1960s it had rebounded dramatically, but by 2009 was again reduced to a small population of around 300.

=== Conservation status ===
In 2012, the emperor penguin was downgraded from a species of least concern to near threatened by the IUCN. Along with nine other species of penguin, it is currently under consideration for inclusion under the US Endangered Species Act. The primary causes for an increased risk of species endangerment are declining food availability, due to the effects of climate change and industrial fisheries on the crustacean and fish populations. Other reasons for the species's placement on the Endangered Species Act's list include disease, habitat destruction, and disturbance at breeding colonies by humans. Of particular concern is the impact of tourism. One study concluded that emperor penguin chicks in a crèche become more apprehensive following a helicopter approach to 1,000 m (3,300 ft).

Population declines of 50% in the Terre Adélie region were observed due to an increased death rate among adult birds, especially males, during an abnormally prolonged warm period in the late 1970s, which resulted in reduced sea-ice coverage. On the other hand, egg hatching success rates declined when the sea-ice extent increased; chick deaths also increased; the species is therefore considered to be highly sensitive to climatic changes. In 2009, the Dion Islands colony, which had been extensively studied since 1948, was reported to have completely disappeared at some point over the previous decade, the fate of the birds unknown. This was the first confirmed loss of an entire colony.

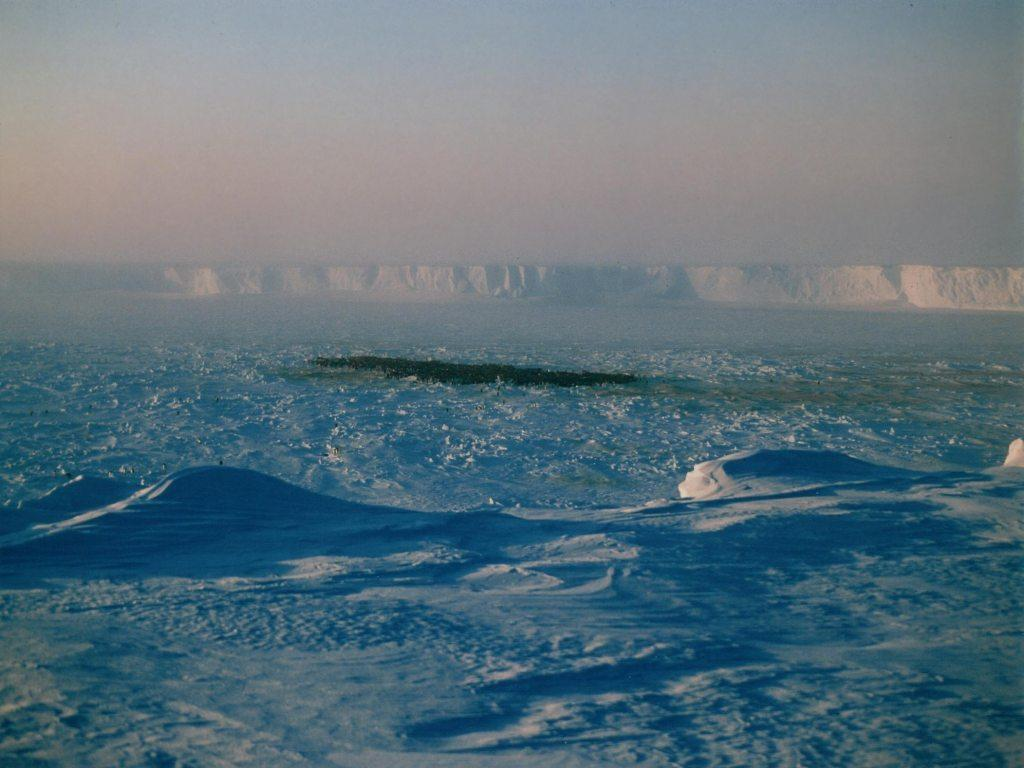
Halley Bay Colony in 1999

Beginning in September 2015, a strong El Niño, strong winds, and record low amounts of sea ice resulted in "almost total breeding failure" with the deaths of thousands of emperor chicks for three consecutive years within the Halley Bay colony, the second largest emperor penguin colony in the world. Concomitantly, there was immigration of breeding penguins to the Dawson-Lambton colony 55 km (34 mi) south, in which a tenfold population increase was observed between 2016 and 2018. However, this increase was much smaller than the total number of breeding adults lost from the Halley Bay colony.

In January 2009, a study from the Woods Hole Oceanographic Institution concluded that global climate change could push the emperor penguin to the brink of extinction by the year 2100. The study constructed a mathematical model to predict how the loss of sea ice from climate warming would affect a big colony of emperor penguins at Terre Adélie, Antarctica. The study forecasted an 87% decline in the colony's population, from three thousand breeding pairs in 2009 to four hundred breeding pairs in 2100.

Another study by the Woods Hole Oceanographic Institution in 2014 again concluded that emperor penguins are at risk from global warming, which is melting the sea ice. This study predicted that by 2100 all colonies of emperor penguins will be declining in numbers, mostly due to loss of habitat. Loss of ice reduces the supply of krill, which is a primary food for emperor penguins. A 2023 study found that more than 90% of emperor penguin colonies could face "quasi-extinction" from "catastrophic breeding failure" due to the loss of sea ice caused by climate change.

== Behaviour ==
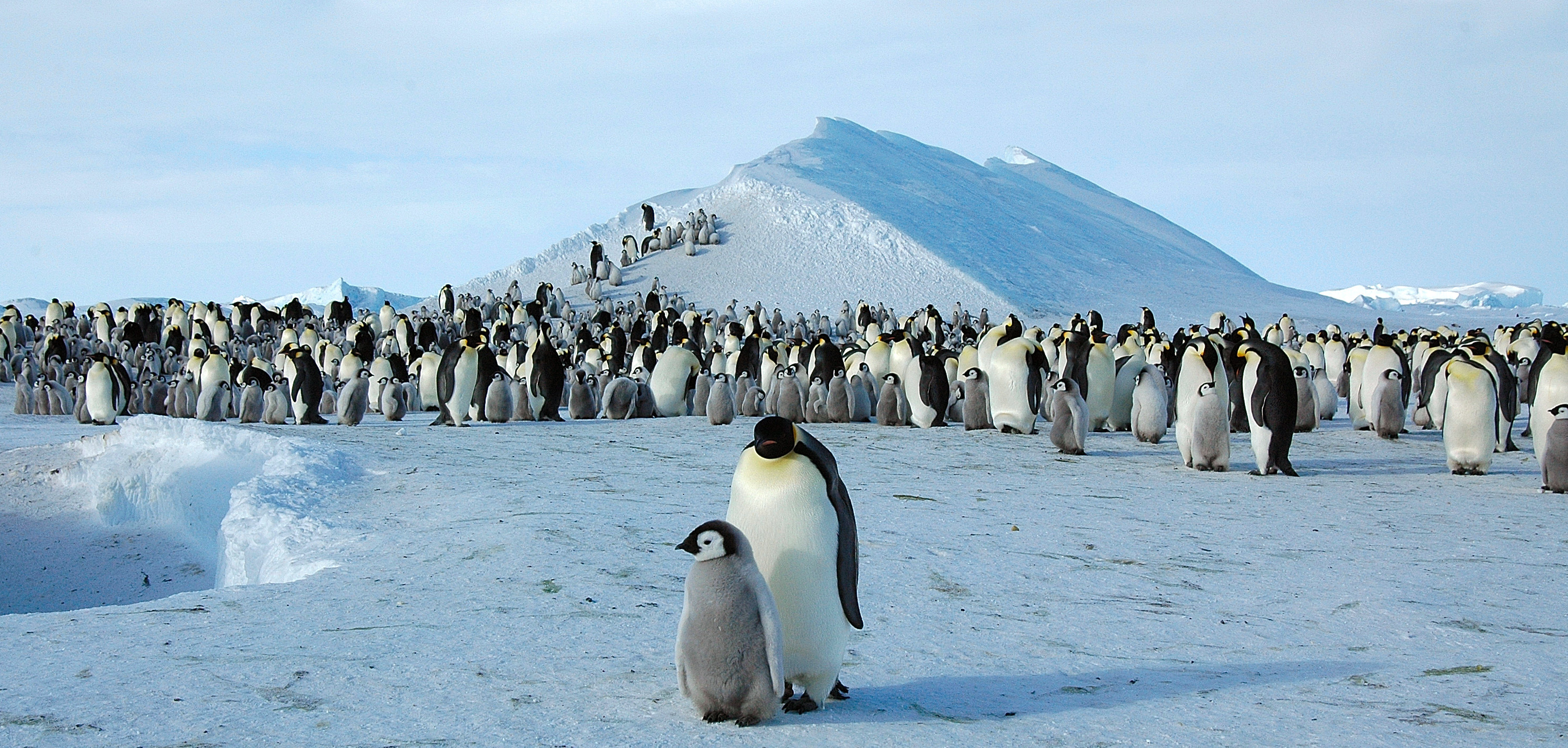
An emperor penguin colony on Snow Hill Island

A group of emperor penguins synchronously diving from the edge of some ice in Antarctica; video from Watanabe et al., "Activity Time Budget during Foraging Trips of Emperor Penguins"

The emperor penguin is a social animal in its nesting and its foraging behaviour; birds hunting together may coordinate their diving and surfacing. Individuals may be active day or night. A mature adult travels throughout most of the year between the breeding colony and ocean foraging areas; the species disperses into the oceans from January to March.

The American physiologist Gerry Kooyman revolutionised the study of penguin foraging behaviour in 1971 when he published his results from attaching automatic dive-recording devices to emperor penguins. He found that the species reaches depths of 265 m (869 ft), with dive periods of up to 18 minutes. Later research revealed a small female had dived to a depth of 535 m (1,755 ft) near McMurdo Sound. It is possible that emperor penguins can dive for even deeper and longer periods, as the accuracy of the recording devices is diminished at greater depths. Further study of one bird's diving behaviour revealed regular dives to 150 m (490 ft) in water around 900 m (3,000 ft) deep, and shallow dives of less than 50 m (160 ft), interspersed with deep dives of more than 400 m (1,300 ft) in depths of 450 to 500 m (1,480 to 1,640 ft). This was suggestive of feeding near or at the sea bottom. In 1994, a penguin from Auster rookery reached a depth of 564 m (1,850 ft); the entire dive took him 21.8 min.

Both male and female emperor penguins forage for food up to 500 km (310 mi) from colonies while collecting food to feed chicks, covering 82–1,454 km (51–903 mi) per individual per trip. A male returning to the sea after incubation heads directly out to areas of permanent open water, known as polynyas, around 100 km (62 mi) from the colony.

An efficient swimmer, the emperor penguin exerts pressure with both its upward and downward strokes while swimming. The upward stroke works against buoyancy and helps maintain depth. Its average swimming speed is 6–9 km/h (3.7–5.6 mph). On land, the emperor penguin alternates between walking with a wobbling gait and tobogganing—sliding over the ice on its belly, propelled by its feet and wing-like flippers. Like all penguins, it is flightless. The emperor penguin is a very powerful bird. In one case, a crew of six men, trying to capture a single male penguin for a zoo collection, were repeatedly tossed around and knocked over before all of the men had to collectively tackle the bird, which weighs about half as much as a man.

As a defence against the cold, a colony of emperor penguins forms a compact huddle (also known as the turtle formation) ranging in size from ten to several hundred birds, with each bird leaning forward on a neighbour. As the wind chill is the least severe in the center of the colony, all the juveniles are usually huddled there. Those on the outside upwind tend to shuffle slowly around the edge of the formation and add themselves to its leeward edge, producing a slow churning action, and giving each bird a turn on the inside and on the outside.

=== Predators ===
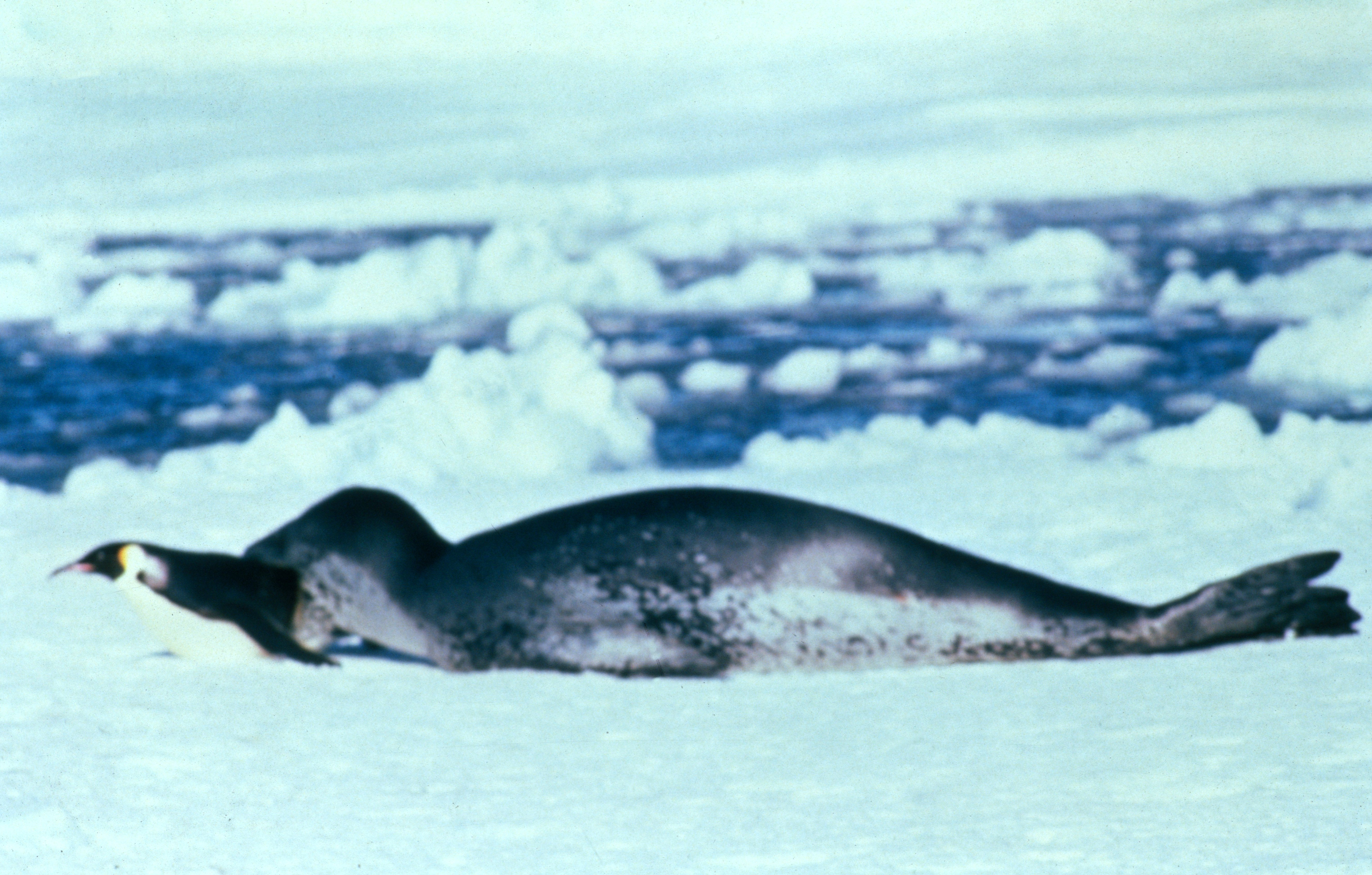
Emperor penguin attacked by a leopard seal

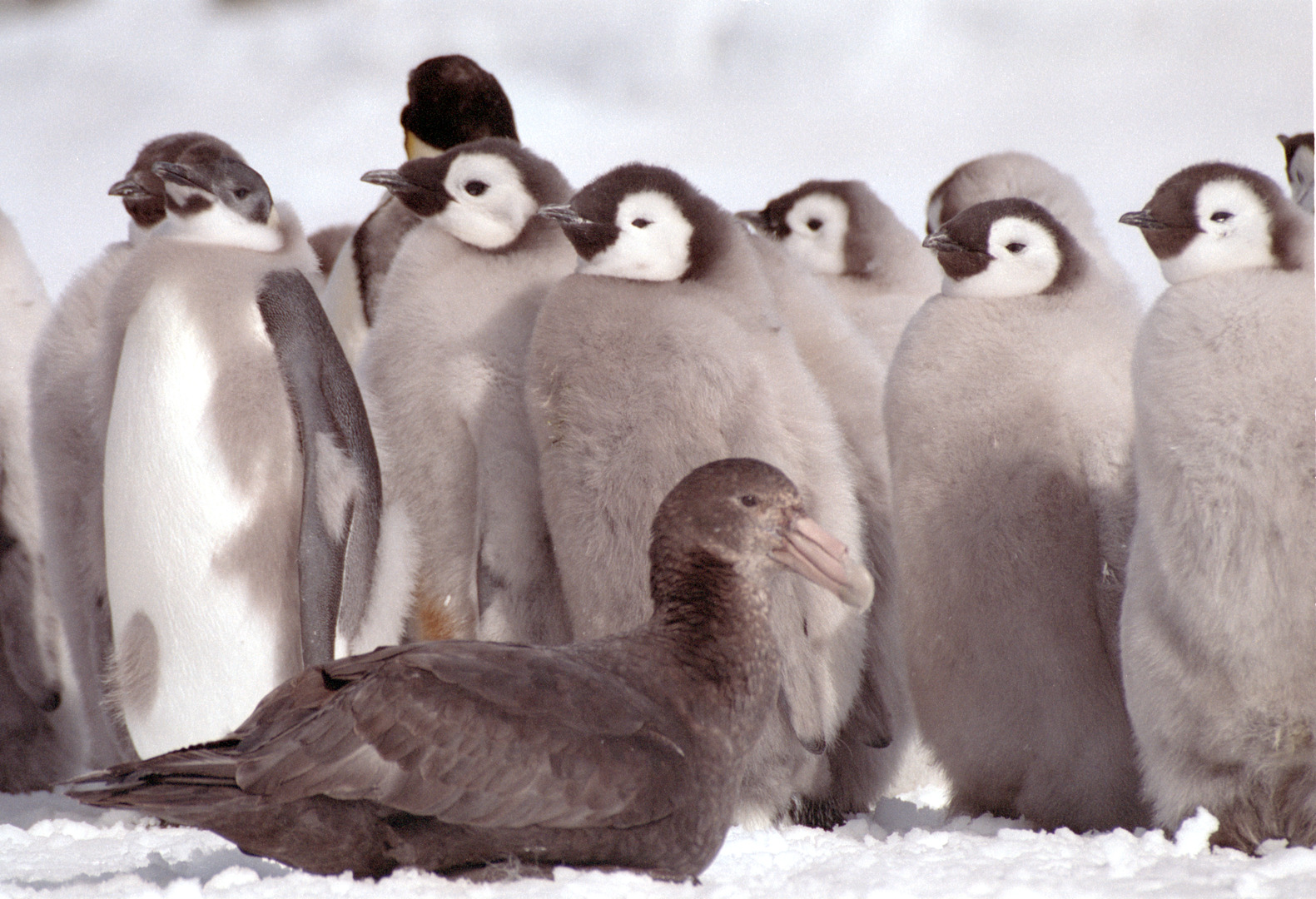
Giant petrel and emperor penguin chicks

The emperor penguin's predators include birds and aquatic mammals. Southern giant petrels (Macronectes giganteus) are the predominant land predator of chicks, responsible for over one-third of chick deaths in some colonies; they also scavenge dead penguins. The south polar skua (Stercorarius maccormicki) mainly scavenges for dead chicks, as the live chicks are usually too large to be attacked by the time of its annual arrival in the colony. Occasionally, a parent may attempt to defend its chick from attack, although it may be more passive if the chick is weak or sickly.

The only known predators known to attack healthy adults, and which attack emperor penguins in the ocean, are the leopard seal (Hydrurga leptonyx), which takes adult birds and fledglings soon after they enter the water. Orcas (Orcinus orca) mostly take adult birds at sea, although they will attack penguins of any age in or near water.

=== Courtship and breeding ===
Although emperor penguins can breed at around three years of age, they generally do not begin breeding for another one to three years. The yearly reproductive cycle begins at the start of the Antarctic winter, in March and April, when all mature emperor penguins travel to colonial nesting areas, often walking 50 to 120 km (31 to 75 mi) inland from the edge of the pack ice. The start of travel appears to be triggered by decreasing day lengths; emperor penguins in captivity have been induced successfully into breeding by using artificial lighting systems mimicking seasonal Antarctic day lengths. The British Antarctic Survey used satellite imagery to find new emperor penguin breeding sites in Antarctica, a discovery that increased the estimated population of the emperor penguins by 5 to 10 percent to around 278,000 breeding pairs. Given their remote locations and harsh weather conditions, penguin populations are found by scanning aerial imagery and locating enormous pages of ice that have been stained with their guano. The new discoveries increased the number of known breeding sites from 50 to 61.

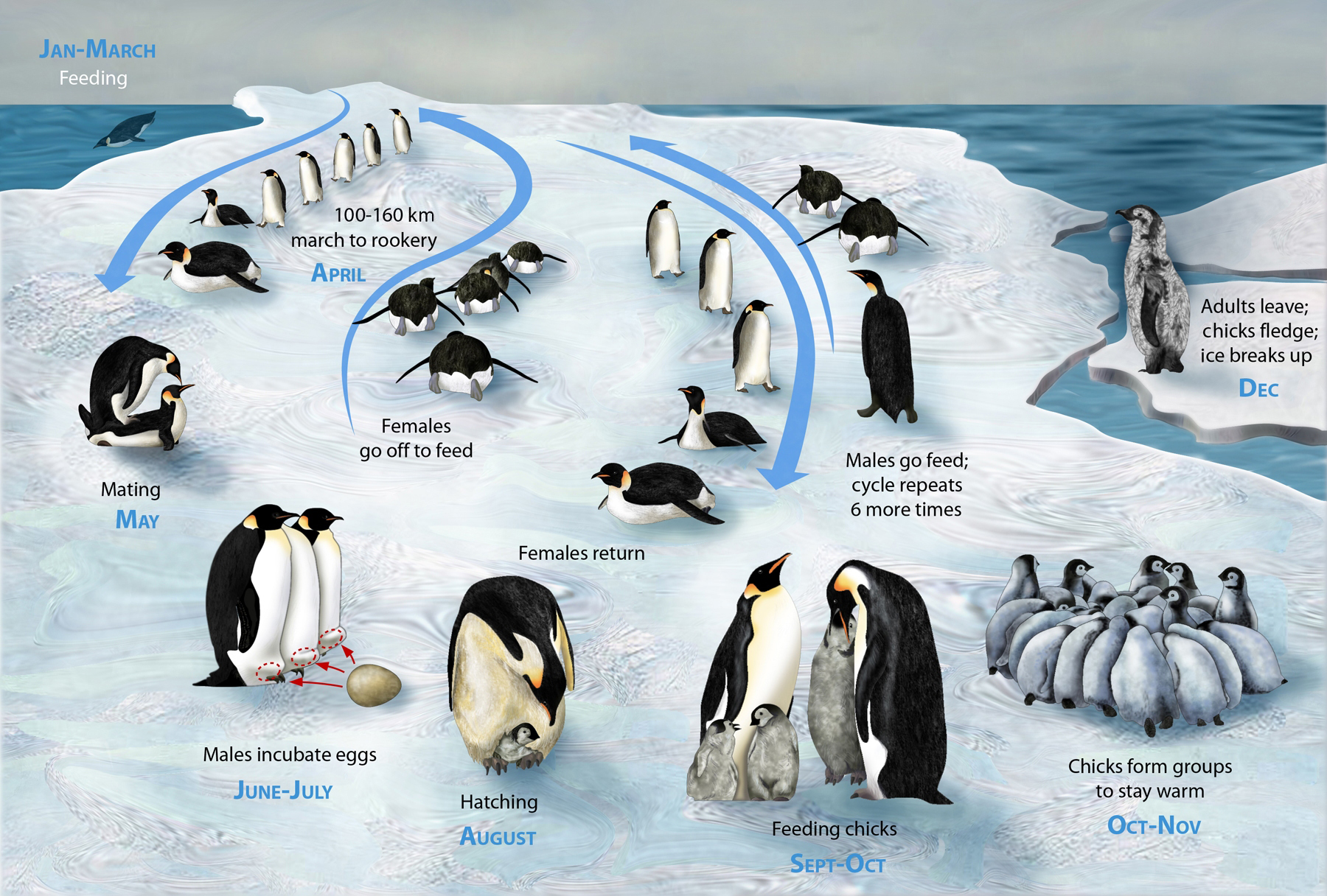
The life-cycle of the emperor penguin

The penguins start courtship in March or April, when the temperature can be as low as −40 °C (−40 °F). A lone male gives an ecstatic display, in which it stands still and places its head on its chest before inhaling and giving a courtship call for 1–2 seconds; it then moves around the colony and repeats the call. A male and female then stand face to face, with one extending its head and neck up and the other mirroring it; they both hold this posture for several minutes. Once in pairs, couples waddle around the colony together, with the female usually following the male. Before copulation, one bird bows deeply to its mate, its bill pointed close to the ground, and its mate then does the same.

Contrary to popular belief, emperor penguins do not mate for life; they are serially monogamous, having only one mate each year, and remaining faithful to that mate. However, fidelity between years is only around 15%. The narrow window of opportunity available for mating appears to be an influence, as there is a priority to mate and breed which usually precludes waiting for the previous year's partner to arrive at the colony.

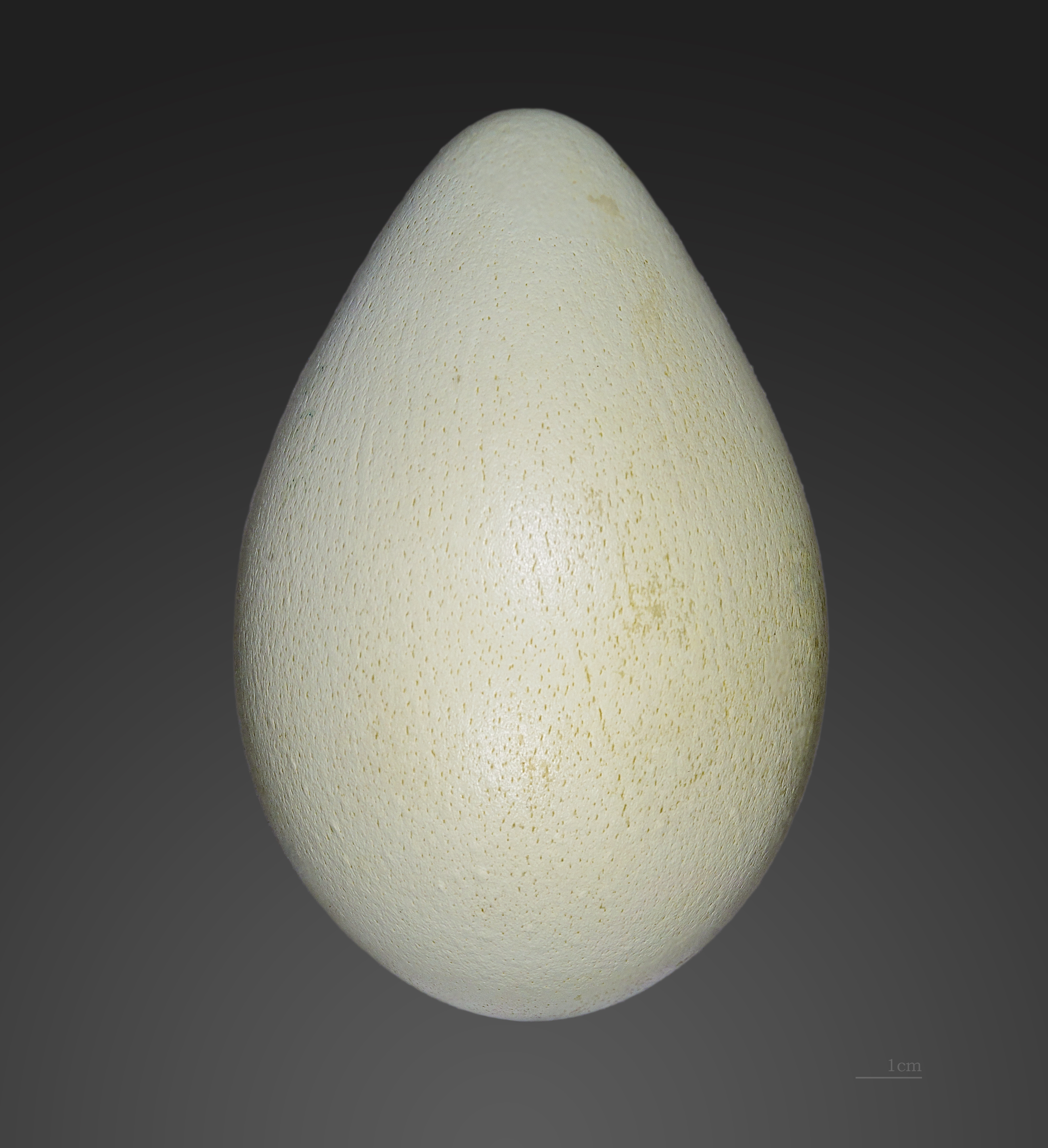
The egg of the emperor penguin. It is 13.5 × 9.5 cm and avocado-shaped.

The female penguin lays one 460–470 g (16–17 oz) egg in May or early June; it is vaguely pear-shaped, pale greenish-white, and measures around 12 cm × 8 cm (4.7 in × 3.1 in). It represents just 2.3% of its mother's body weight, making it one of the smallest eggs relative to the maternal weight in any bird species. 15.7% of the weight of an emperor penguin egg is shell; like those of other penguin species, the shell is relatively thick, which helps minimise risk of breakage.

After laying, the mother's food reserves are exhausted. She carefully transfers the egg to the male and then returns to the sea for two months to feed. The transfer of the egg can be awkward and difficult, especially for first-time parents, and many couples drop or crack the egg in the process. When this happens, the chick inside is quickly lost, as the egg cannot withstand the sub-freezing temperatures on the icy ground for more than one to two minutes. When a couple loses an egg in this manner, their relationship is ended and both walk back to the sea. They will return to the colony next year to try mating again. After a successful transfer of the egg to the male penguin, the female departs for the sea and the male spends the dark, stormy winter incubating the egg against his brood patch, a patch of skin without feathers. There he balances it on the tops of his feet, engulfing it with loose skin and feathers for around 65–75 days until hatching. The emperor is the only penguin species where the male alone incubates; in all other penguin species both parents take shifts incubating. By the time the egg hatches, the male will have fasted for around 120 days since arriving at the colony. To survive the cold and savage winds of up to 200 km/h (120 mph), the males huddle together, taking turns in the middle of the huddle. They have also been observed with their backs to the wind to conserve body heat. In the four months of travel, courtship, and incubation, the male may lose as much as 20 kg (44 lb), dropping from a total mass of 38 to 18 kg (84 to 40 lb).

Hatching may take as long as two or three days to complete, as the shell of the egg is thick. Newly hatched chicks are semi-altricial, covered with only a thin layer of down and entirely dependent on their parents for food and warmth. The chick usually hatches before the mother's return, and the father feeds it a curd-like substance composed of 59% protein and 28% lipid, which is secreted by a gland in his oesophagus. This ability to produce "crop milk" in birds is only found in pigeons, flamingos and male emperor penguins. After the chick hatches, the father is able to secrete this crop milk for only 3 to 7 days; this will temporarily sustain the chick until the mother returns to the colony with food from fishing at sea to properly feed the chick. If the mother penguin's arrival is delayed, the chick will die. Research indicates that 10–20% of female emperor penguins do not return to their colony from foraging at sea, most victims of the harsh winter weather conditions or predators. The young chick is brooded in what is called the "guard phase", spending time balanced on its parent's feet and kept warm by the brood patch.

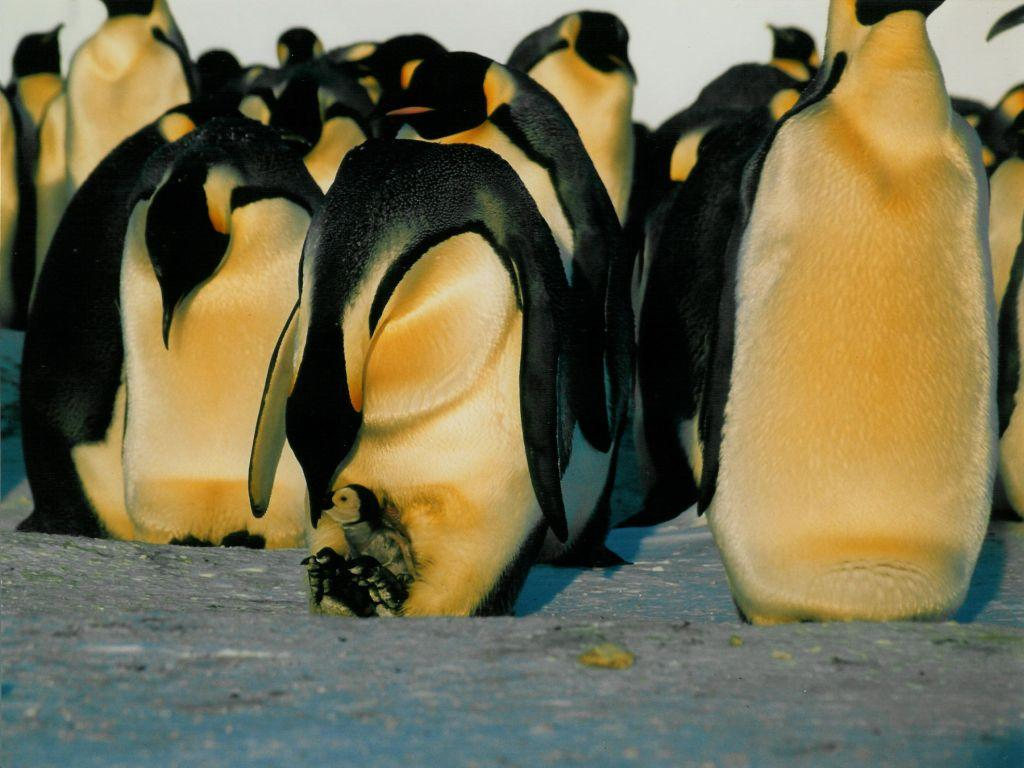
Emperor penguin feeding a chick

The female penguin returns at any time from hatching up to ten days afterwards, from mid-July to early August. She finds her mate among the hundreds of fathers by his vocal call and takes over caring for the chick, feeding it by regurgitating the partially digested fish, squid and krill that she has stored in her stomach. The male is often reluctant to surrender the chick he has been caring for all winter to its mother, but he soon leaves to take his turn at sea, spending 3 to 4 weeks feeding there before returning. The parents then take turns, one brooding while the other forages at sea. If either parent is delayed or fails to return to the colony, the lone parent will return to the sea to feed, leaving the chick to die. Abandoned eggs do not hatch and orphaned chicks never survive.

Female emperors who failed to find a mate to breed with or have lost their own chick may attempt to adopt a stray chick or steal the chick of another female. The mother of the chick and neighboring females will fight to protect the chick, or to reclaim it if it has been successfully stolen. These scuffles involving several birds often result in the chick being smothered or trampled to death. Chicks which have been adopted or stolen are quickly abandoned once again, as it is impossible for the female to feed and care for the chick alone. The orphaned chicks wander around the colony attempting to seek food and protection from other adults. They will even try to shelter themselves in an adult bird's brood patch already occupied by its own chick. These stray chicks are brusquely driven away by the adults and their chicks. All orphaned chicks will rapidly become weaker and die of starvation, or freeze to death.

About 45–50 days after hatching, the chicks form a crèche, huddling together for warmth and protection. During this time, both parents forage at sea and return periodically to feed their chicks. A crèche may consist of from around a dozen to up to several thousand chicks densely packed together and is essential for surviving the low Antarctic temperatures.

From early November, chicks begin moulting into juvenile plumage, which takes up to two months and is usually not completed by the time they leave the colony. Adults cease feeding them during this time. All birds make the considerably shorter trek to the sea in December and January. The birds spend the rest of the summer feeding there.

=== Feeding ===
The emperor penguin's diet consists mainly of fish, crustaceans and cephalopods, although its composition varies from population to population. Fish are usually the most important food source, and the Antarctic silverfish (Pleuragramma antarcticum) makes up the bulk of the bird's diet. Other prey commonly recorded include other fish of the family Nototheniidae, the glacial squid (Psychroteuthis glacialis), and the hooked squid species Kondakovia longimana, as well as Antarctic krill (Euphausia superba). The emperor penguin searches for prey in the open water of the Southern Ocean, in either ice-free areas of open water or tidal cracks in pack ice. One of its feeding strategies is to dive to around 50 m (160 ft), where it can easily spot sympagic fish like the bald notothen (Pagothenia borchgrevinki) swimming against the bottom surface of the sea-ice; it swims up to the bottom of the ice and catches the fish. It then dives again and repeats the sequence about half a dozen times before surfacing to breathe.

== Relationship with humans ==
=== In zoos and aquariums ===
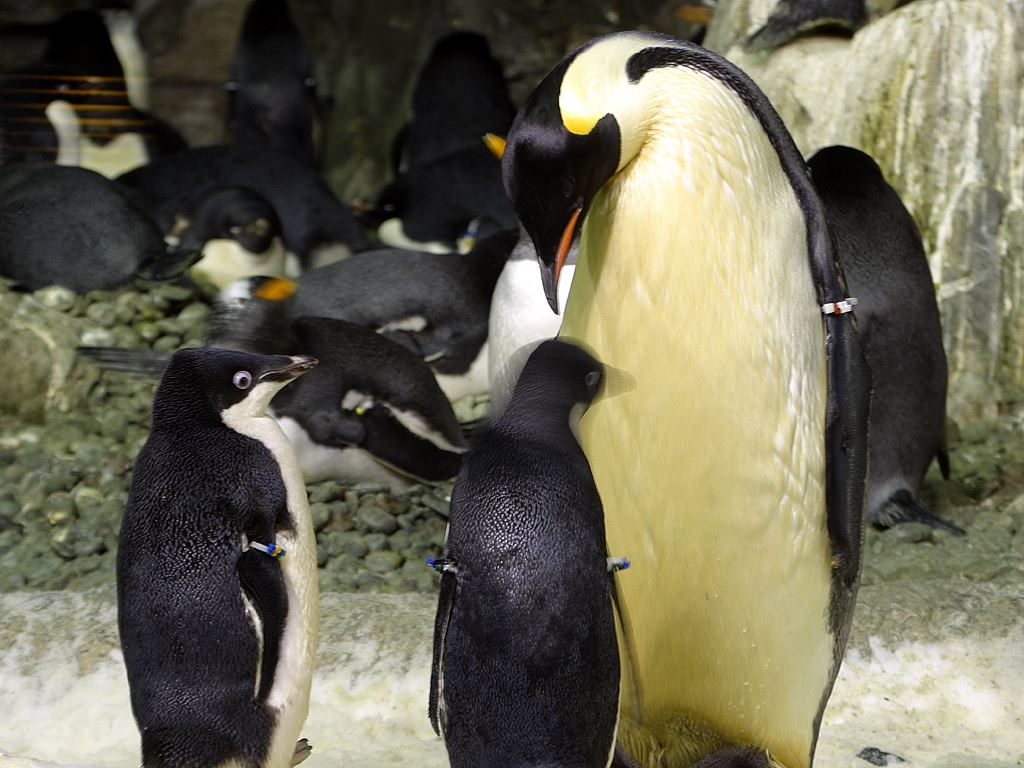
Two Adélie penguins and an emperor penguin at SeaWorld San Diego

Since the 1930s, there have been several attempts at keeping emperor penguins in captivity. Malcolm Davis of the National Zoological Park made early attempts at keeping penguins, capturing several from Antarctica. He successfully transferred penguins to the National Zoological Park on March 5, 1940, where they lived for up to 6 years.

Until the 1960s, keeping attempts were largely unsuccessful, as knowledge of penguin keeping in general was limited and acquired by trial and error. The first to achieve a level of success was Aalborg Zoo where a chilled house was built especially for this Antarctic species. One individual lived for 20 years at the zoo and a chick was hatched there, but died shortly after.

Today the species, considered a flagship species, is kept at just a few zoos and public aquariums in North America and Asia. Emperor penguins were first successfully bred at SeaWorld San Diego; more than 20 birds have hatched there since 1980. Fifty-five individuals were counted in captivity in North American zoos and aquaria in 1999. In China, the emperor penguin was first bred at Nanjing Underwater World in 2009, followed by Laohutan Ocean Park in Dalian in 2010. Since then it has been kept and bred at a few other facilities in China, and the only confirmed twin emperor penguins (the species normally lays just one egg) hatched at Sun Asia Ocean World in Dalian in 2017. In Japan, the species is housed at the Port of Nagoya Public Aquarium and Wakayama Adventure World, with successful hatching at Adventure World.

=== Penguin rescue, rehabilitation and release ===
In June 2011, a juvenile emperor penguin was found on the beach at Peka Peka, north of Wellington in New Zealand. He had consumed 3 kg (6.6 lb) of sand, which he had apparently mistaken for snow, as well as sticks and stones, and had to undergo a number of operations to remove these to save his life. Following recovery, on 4 September, the juvenile, named "Happy Feet" (after the 2006 film), was fitted with a tracking device and released into the Southern Ocean 80 km (50 mi) north of Campbell Island. However, 8 days later scientists lost contact with the bird, suggesting that the transmitter had fallen off (considered likely) or that he had been eaten by a predator (considered less likely).

=== Cultural references ===
The species' unique life cycle in such a harsh environment has been described in print and visual media. Apsley Cherry-Garrard, the Antarctic explorer, wrote in 1922: "Take it all in all, I do not believe anybody on Earth has a worse time than an emperor penguin". Widely distributed in cinemas in 2005, the French documentary La Marche de l'empereur, which was also released with the English title March of the Penguins, told the story of the penguins' reproductive cycle. The subject has been covered for the small screen five times by the BBC and presenter David Attenborough: first in episode five of the 1993 series on the Antarctic Life in the Freezer, again in the 2001 series The Blue Planet, once again in the 2006 series Planet Earth, in Frozen Planet in 2011 and a one-hour programme dedicated to the species in the 2018 series Dynasties.

The animated movie Happy Feet (2006, followed by a sequel Happy Feet Two, 2011) features emperor penguins as its primary characters, with one in particular that loves to dance; although a comedy, it too depicts their life cycle and promotes an underlying serious environmental message of threats from global warming and depletion of food sources by overfishing. The animated movie Surf's Up (2007) features a surfing emperor penguin named Zeke "Big-Z" Topanga. More than 30 countries have depicted the bird on their stamps – Australia, Great Britain, Chile and France have each issued several. It has also been depicted on a 1962 10 franc stamp as part of an Antarctic expedition series.

DC Comics' crime boss character Oswald Chesterfield Cobblepot, aka "The Penguin", styles himself after an emperor penguin, a fact which is often referenced in stories, e.g., in his occasional alias "Forster Aptenodytes".
