= The Emperor Lays an Egg =

Non-fiction children's book by Brenda Z. Guiberson

- Author: Brenda Z. Guiberson
- Illustrator: Joan Paley
- Publisher: Henry Holt and Co.
- Publication date: December 1, 2001
- ISBN: 978-0-805-06204-5

The Emperor Lays an Egg is a non-fiction children's picture book by Brenda Z. Guiberson, with pictures by Joan Paley.

== Summary ==
An emperor penguin father has to protect his egg for two months while the mother is off searching for food. The book has information about the birth cycle of emperor penguins and it has a story of a mother and father caring for their egg.

== Reception ==
According to Kirkus Reviews, "Although The Emperor's Egg, by Martin Jenkins (1999), covers similar territory, school and public libraries will find this title useful for elementary school science reports, and nature lovers will love the pictures".

The book was also reviewed by Booklist and Horn Book Magazine.
