= Underwater World =

Underwater World may refer to:

- Underwater World, Singapore, oceanarium in Singapore
- UnderWater World, Queensland, marine mammal park, oceanarium and wildlife sanctuary in Queensland, Australia
- UnderWater World Guam, oceanarium in Guam
- Kelly Tarlton's Sea Life Aquarium, formerly Kelly Tarlton's Underwater World – Public aquarium in Auckland, New Zealand
- Nanjing Underwater World, aquarium in Nanjing, China
- The Aquarium of Western Australia (AQWA), formerly Underwater World, Perth, aquarium in Hillarys, Western Australia
- SEA LIFE Minnesota Aquarium, aquarium in Bloomington, Minnesota
- Underwater World (song), a 1984 song by Hanoi Rocks
