= Drift ice =

Sea ice that is not attached to land

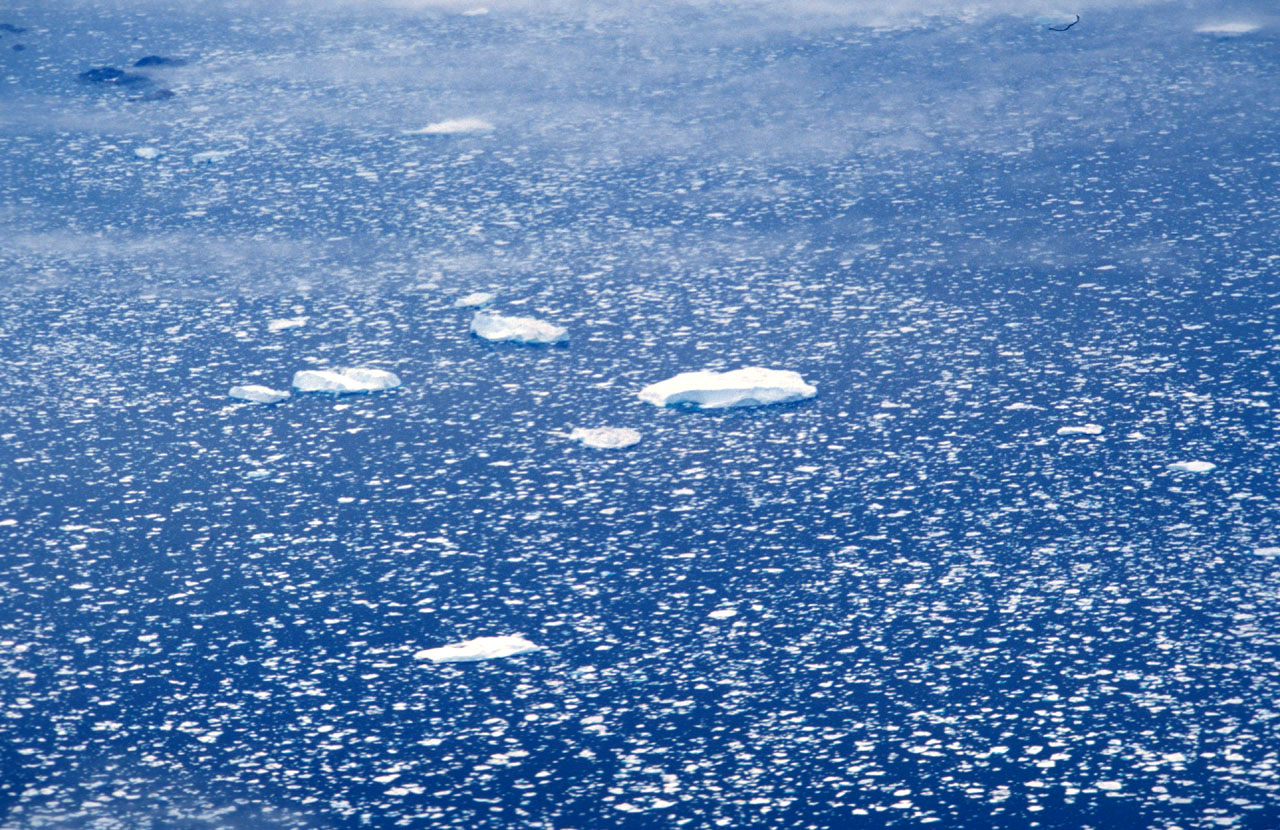
Drift ice, Greenland

Fast ice (left, along shoreline) versus drift ice (right) in a hypothetical sea ice dynamics scenario

Drift ice, also called brash ice, is sea ice that is not attached to the shoreline or any other fixed object (shoals, grounded icebergs, etc.). Unlike fast ice, which is "fastened" to a fixed object, drift ice is carried along by winds and sea currents, hence its name. When drift ice is driven together into a large single mass (>70% coverage), it is called pack ice. Wind and currents can pile up that ice to form ridges up to dozens of metres in thickness. These represent a challenge for icebreakers and offshore structures operating in cold oceans and seas.

Drift ice consists of ice floes, individual pieces of sea ice 20 metres (66 ft) or more across. Floes are classified according to size: small – 20 metres (66 ft) to 100 metres (330 ft); medium – 100 metres (330 ft) to 500 metres (1,600 ft); big – 500 metres (1,600 ft) to 2,000 metres (6,600 ft); vast – 2 kilometres (1.2 mi) to 10 kilometres (6.2 mi); and giant – more than 10 kilometres (6.2 mi).

Drift ice affects:

- Security of navigation
- Climatic impact (see Polar ice packs)
- Geological impact
- Biosphere influence (see Ecology of sea ice)

Drift ice can exert tremendous forces when rammed against structures, and can shear off rudders and propellers from ships and strong structures anchored to the shore, such as piers. These structures must be retractable or removable to avoid damage. Similarly, ships can get stuck between drift ice floes.

The two major ice packs are the Arctic ice pack and the Antarctic ice pack. The most important areas of pack ice are the polar ice packs formed from seawater in the Earth's polar regions: the Arctic ice pack of the Arctic Ocean and the Antarctic ice pack of the Southern Ocean. Polar packs significantly change their size during seasonal changes of the year. Because of vast amounts of water added to or removed from the oceans and atmosphere, the behavior of polar ice packs has a significant impact on global changes in climate.

Seasonal ice drift in the Sea of Okhotsk by the northern coast of Hokkaidō, Japan, has become a tourist attraction, and is one of the 100 Soundscapes of Japan. The Sea of Okhotsk is the southernmost area in the Northern Hemisphere where drift ice may be observed.

== Gallery ==
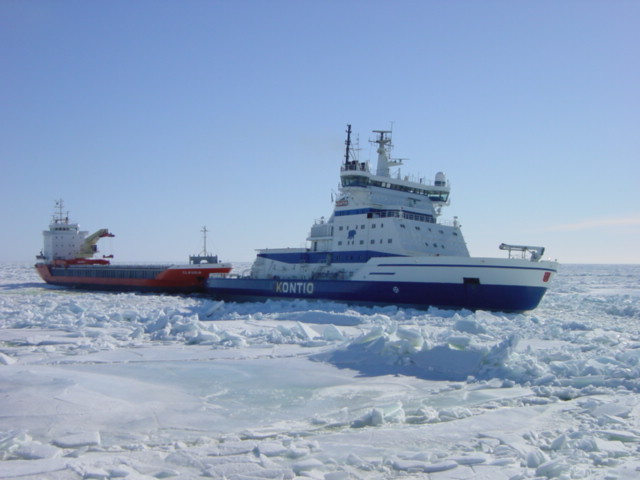
The icebreaker Kontio, which in this picture became stuck in drift ice while towing a cargo ship in pack ice in the northern Baltic Sea

Ice floes / pack ice

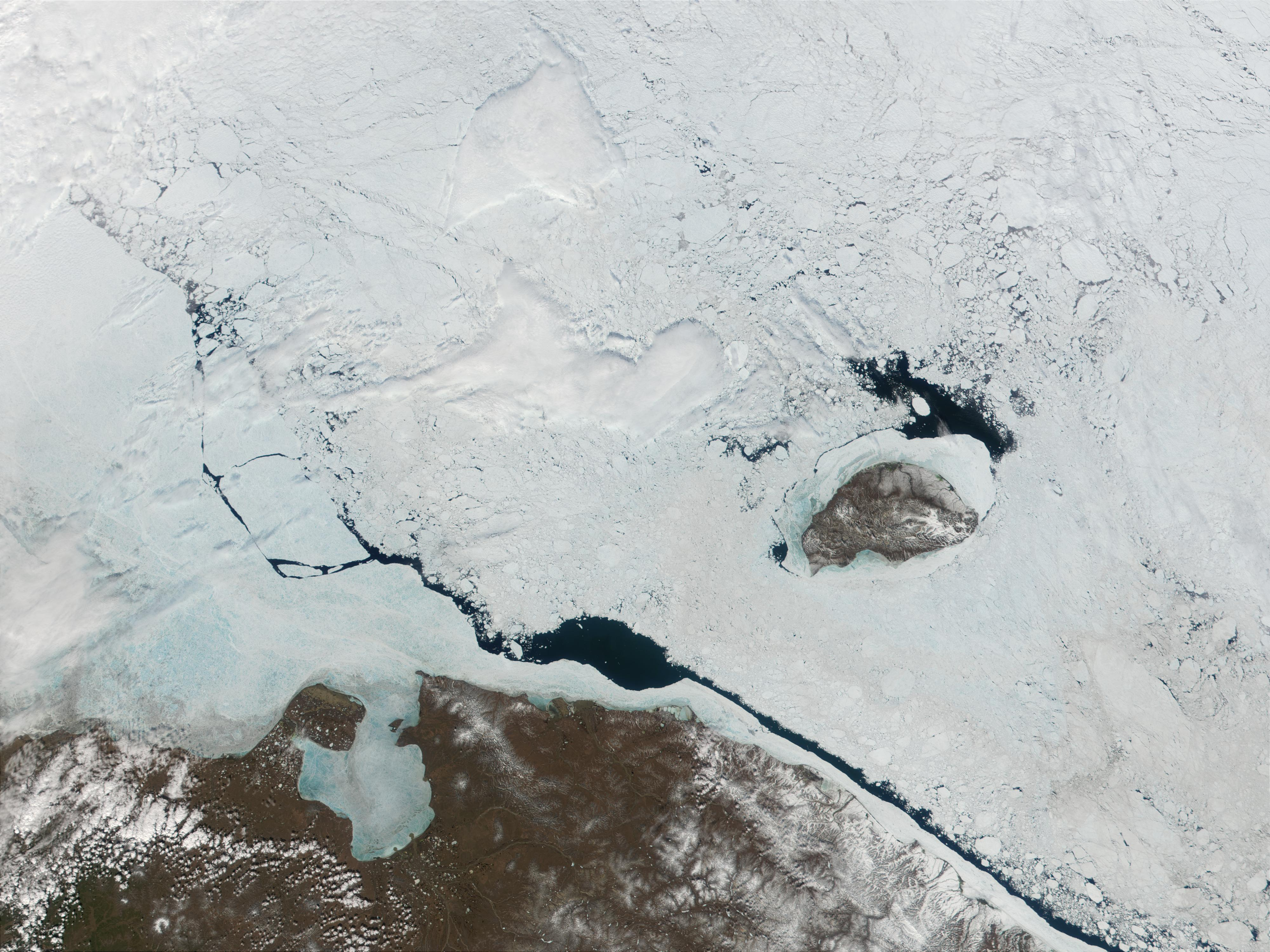
Satellite image of drift ice in the Arctic Ocean around Wrangel Island

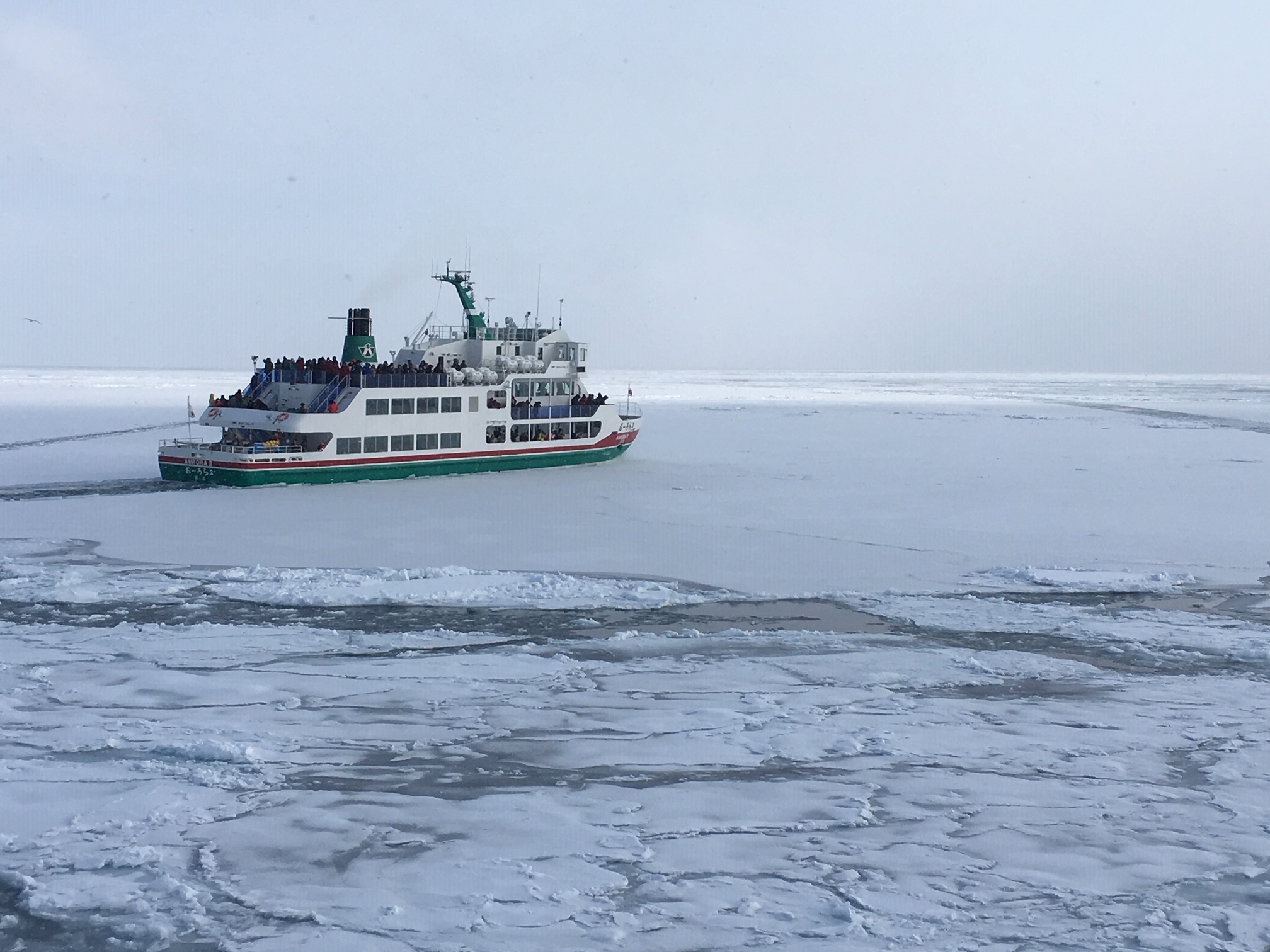
Drift ice in the Sea of Okhotsk

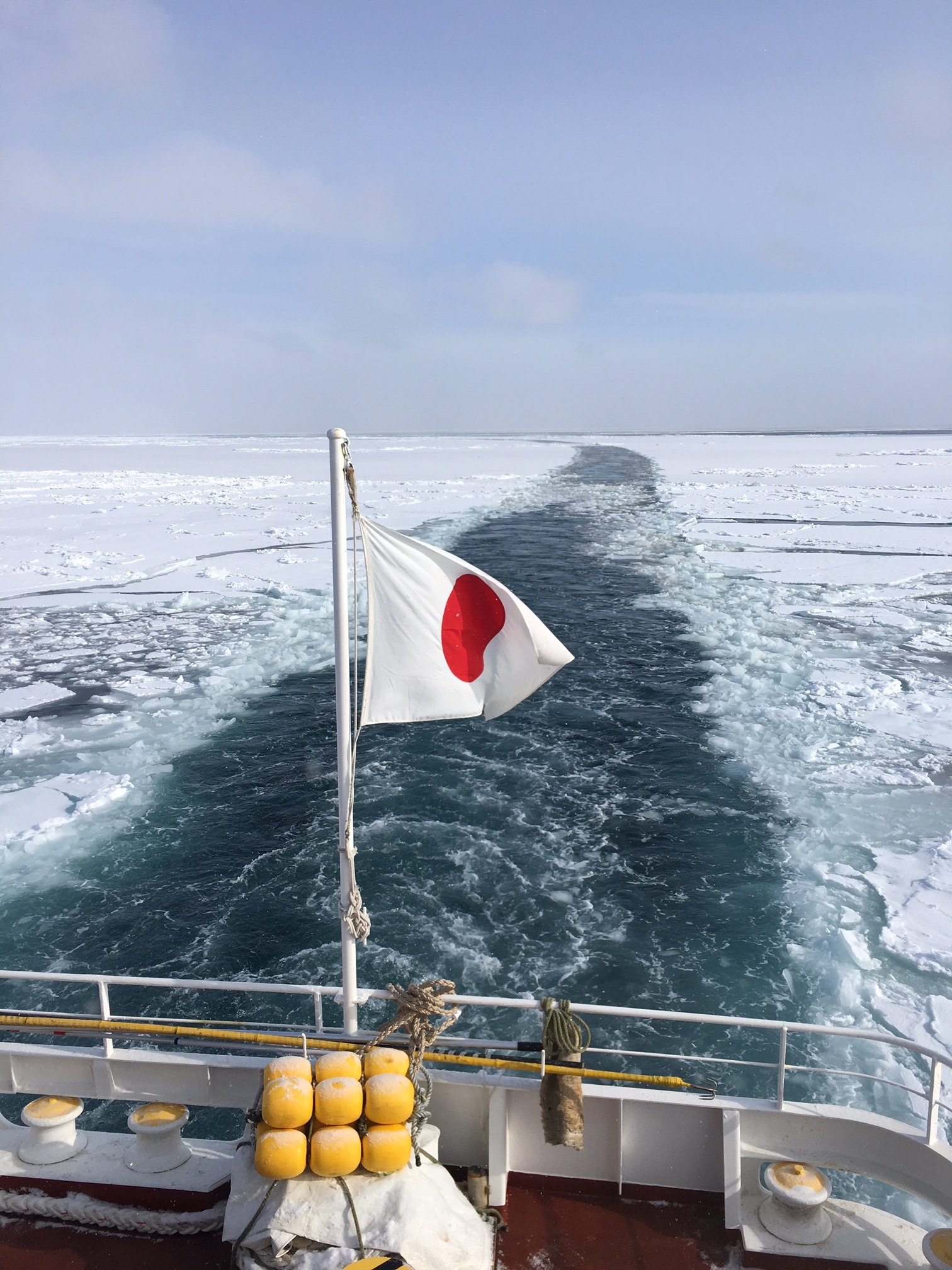
Aboard the Aurora icebreaker in the Sea of Okhotsk

== See also ==
- Drifting ice station – Research stations built on the ice of the high latitudes of the Arctic Ocean
- Iceberg – Large piece of freshwater ice broken off a glacier or ice shelf and floating in open water
- Ice shove – Ice pushed onshore due to water movements or wind
- Lead (sea ice) – Fracture that opens up in an expanse of sea ice
- Polynya – Area of unfrozen sea within an ice pack
- Pressure ridge (ice) – Linear accumulation of ice blocks resulting from the convergence between floes
- Seabed gouging by ice – Outcome of the interaction between drifting ice and the seabed
- Sea ice – Outcome of seawater as it freezes
- Shelf ice – Ice formed on a lake and washed up on the shore
