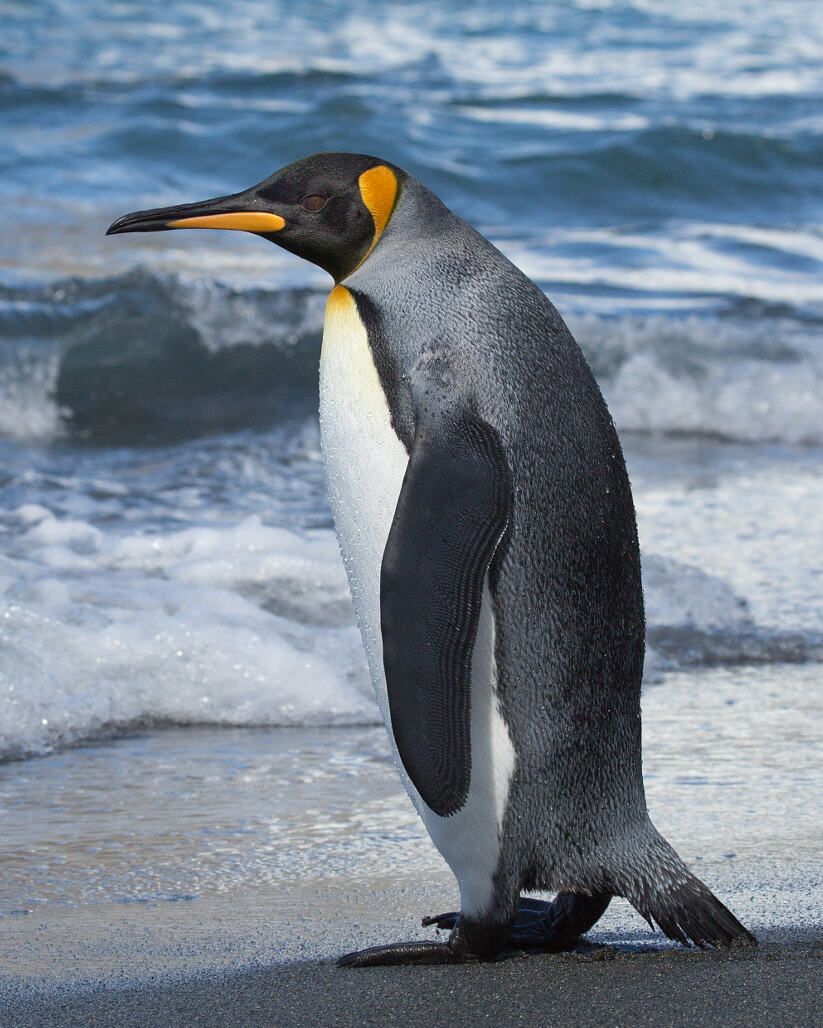
- King penguin (A. patagonicus)
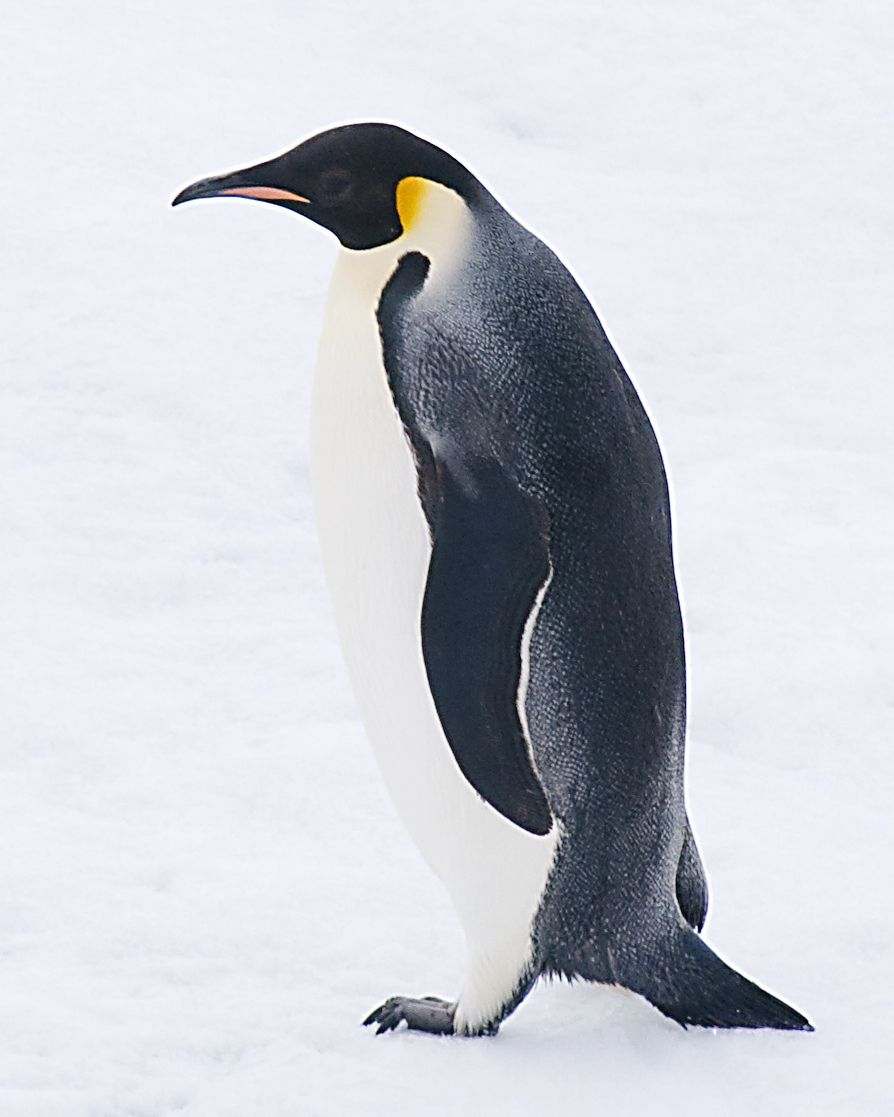
- Emperor penguin (A. forsteri)

Scientific classification
- Kingdom: Animalia
- Phylum: Chordata
- Class: Aves
- Order: Sphenisciformes
- Family: Spheniscidae
- Genus: Aptenodytes; Miller, JF, 1778

Type species
- Aptenodytes patagonicus
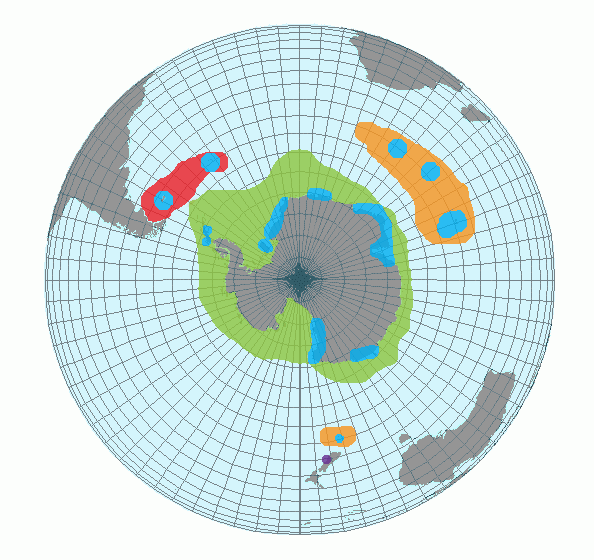
- Aptenodytes patagonicus patagonicus Aptenodytes patagonicus halli Aptenodytes forsteri Aptenodytes ridgeni (fossil) breeding grounds

= Aptenodytes =

Aptenodytes Temporal range: Pliocene to recent

Genus of birds

The genus Aptenodytes contains two extant and one extinct species of penguins, collectively known as the great penguins.

== Etymology ==
The name "Aptenodytes" is a composite of Ancient Greek elements, "ἀ-πτηνο-δύτης" (without-wings-diver).

== Taxonomy ==
- King penguin, Aptenodytes patagonicus
  - Aptenodytes patagonicus patagonicus
  - Aptenodytes patagonicus halli
- Emperor penguin, Aptenodytes forsteri
- †Ridgen's penguin, Aptenodytes ridgeni, an extinct species known from fossil bones of Early or Late Pliocene age.
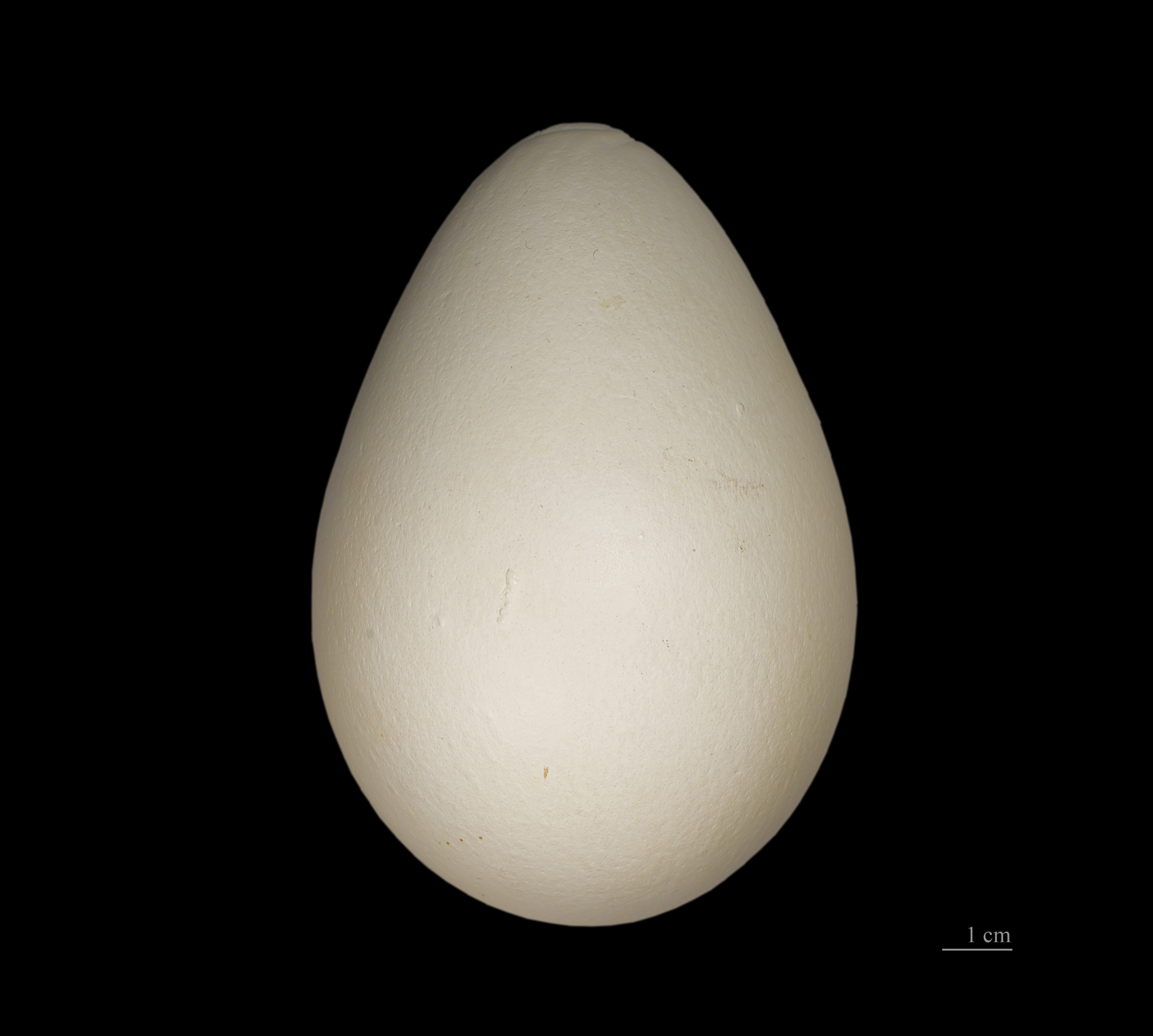
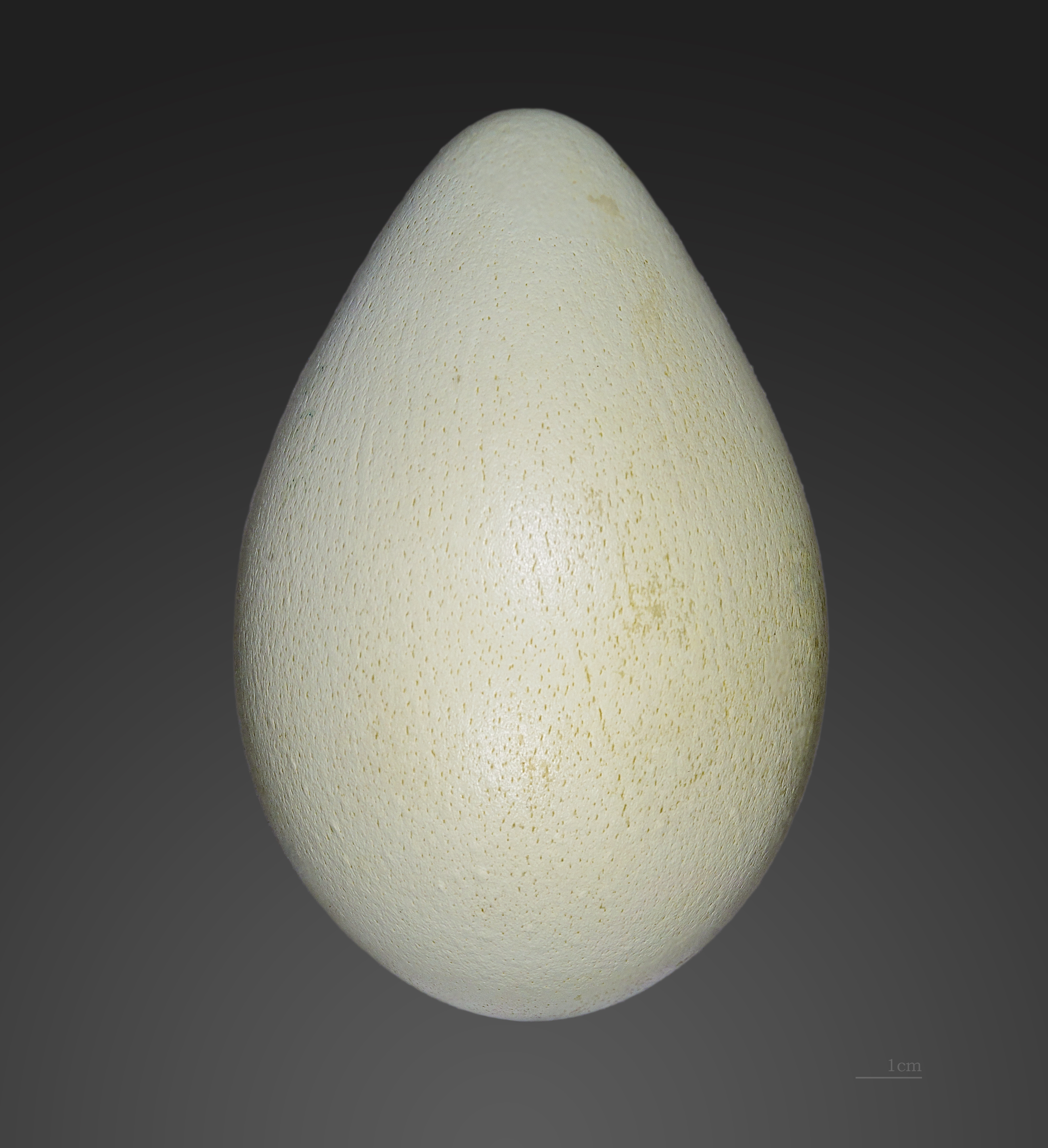
The egg of a king penguin (10 cm, c. 300 g) and that of an emperor penguin (11.1–12.7 cm, 345–515 g).

Combined morphological and molecular data have shown the genus Aptenodytes to be basal to all other living penguins, that is, the genus split off from a branch which led to all other species. DNA evidence suggests this split occurred around 40 million years ago. This had been foreshadowed by an attempt to classify penguins by their behavior, which also predicted the genus' basal nature.

== Species ==
Two species are extant:

Genus Aptenodytes – Miller, JF, 1778 – two species
Common name	Scientific name and subspecies	Range	Size and ecology	IUCN status and estimated population
King penguin	Aptenodytes patagonicus Miller, JF, 1778 Two subspecies: Aptenodytes patagonicus patagonicus; Aptenodytes patagonicus halli	Breeds on the subantarctic islands between 45° and 55° S at the northern reaches of Antarctica, as well as Tierra del Fuego, the Falkland Islands and other temperate islands of the region.	Size: 90 cm (3 ft) tall, weighing 11 to 16 kg (24 to 35 lb), The upper parts are steel blue-grey, darkening to black on the head, the belly is white fading to orange on the upper breast with bright orange ear patches. The black bill is long and slender. The lower mandible bears a striking pink or orange-coloured mandibular plate Habitat: Diet:	LC
Emperor penguin	Aptenodytes forsteri Gray, 1844	Circumpolar distribution in the Antarctic between the 66° and 77° S. It almost always breeds on stable pack ice near the coast and wander up to 18 km (11 mi) offshore.	Size: 122 cm (4 ft) tall, weighing 22–37 kg (48.5–82 lb), the adult has deep black dorsal feathers, covering: the head, chin, throat, back, dorsal part of the flippers and tail. The underparts of the wings and belly are white, becoming pale yellow in the upper breast, and ear patches are bright yellow. The upper mandible is black and the lower mandible can be pink, orange or lilac. Males and females are similar in size and coloration. Habitat: Diet:	NT

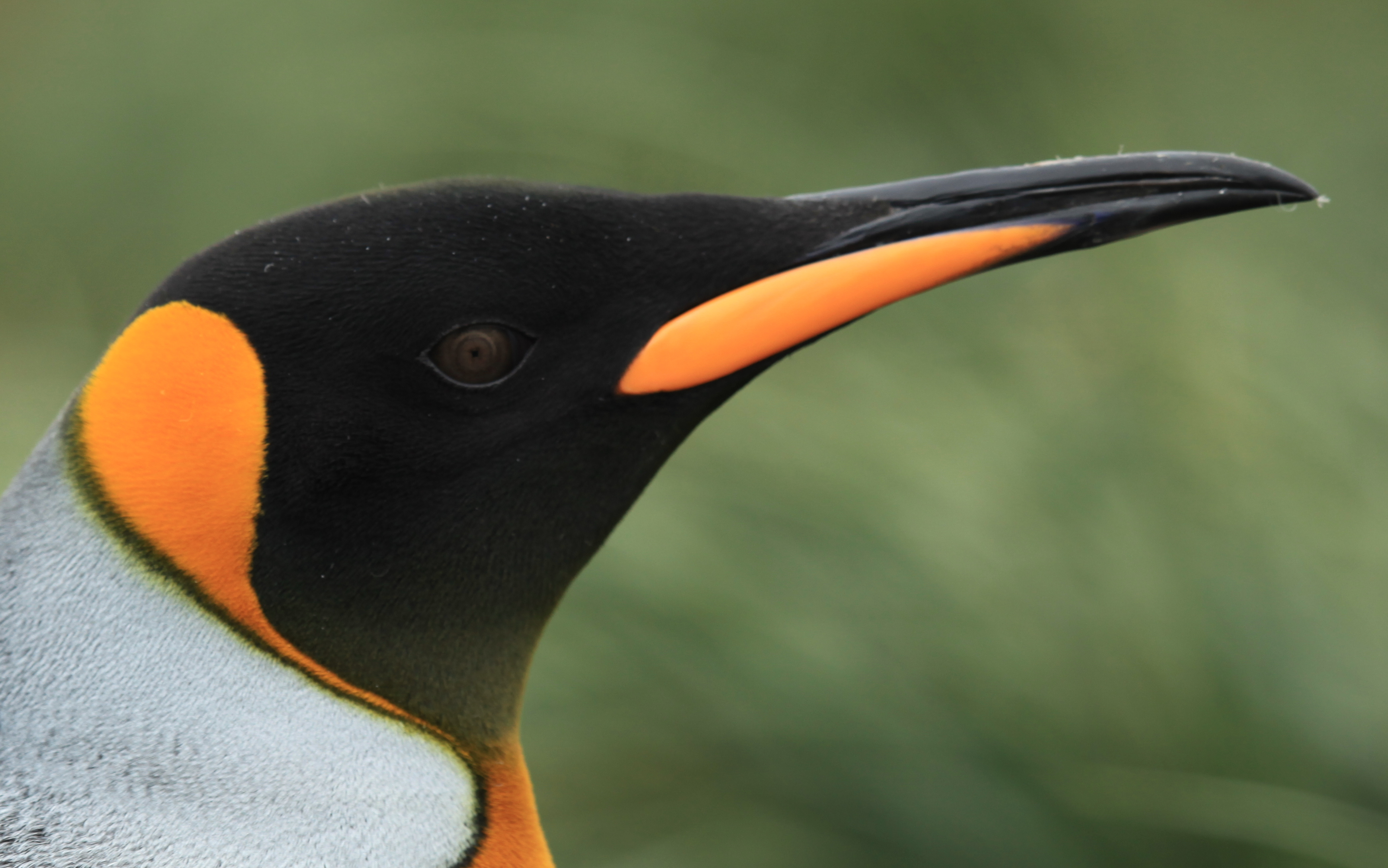
King penguin

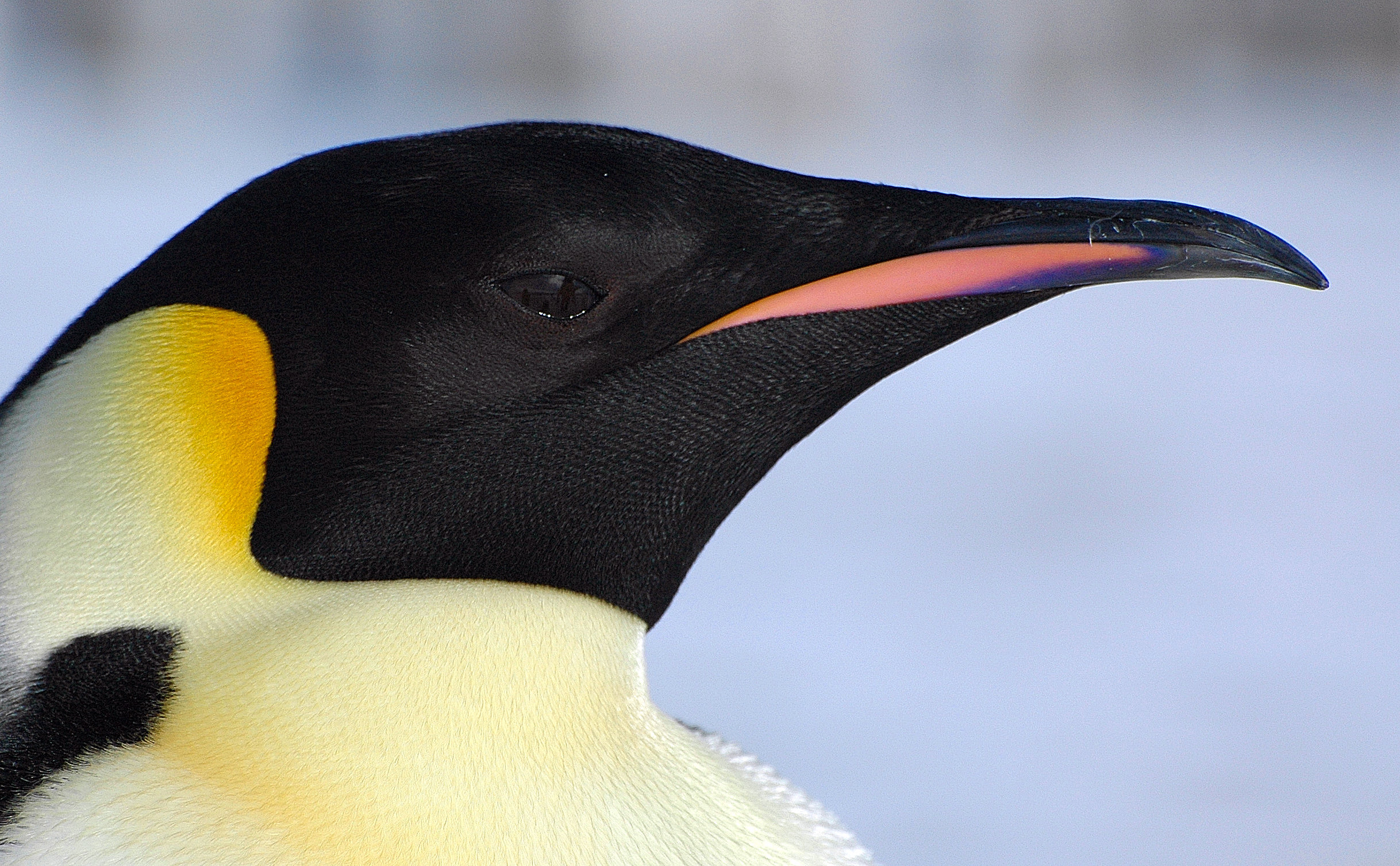
Emperor penguin
