= Shelf ice =

Ice formed on a lake and washed up on the shore

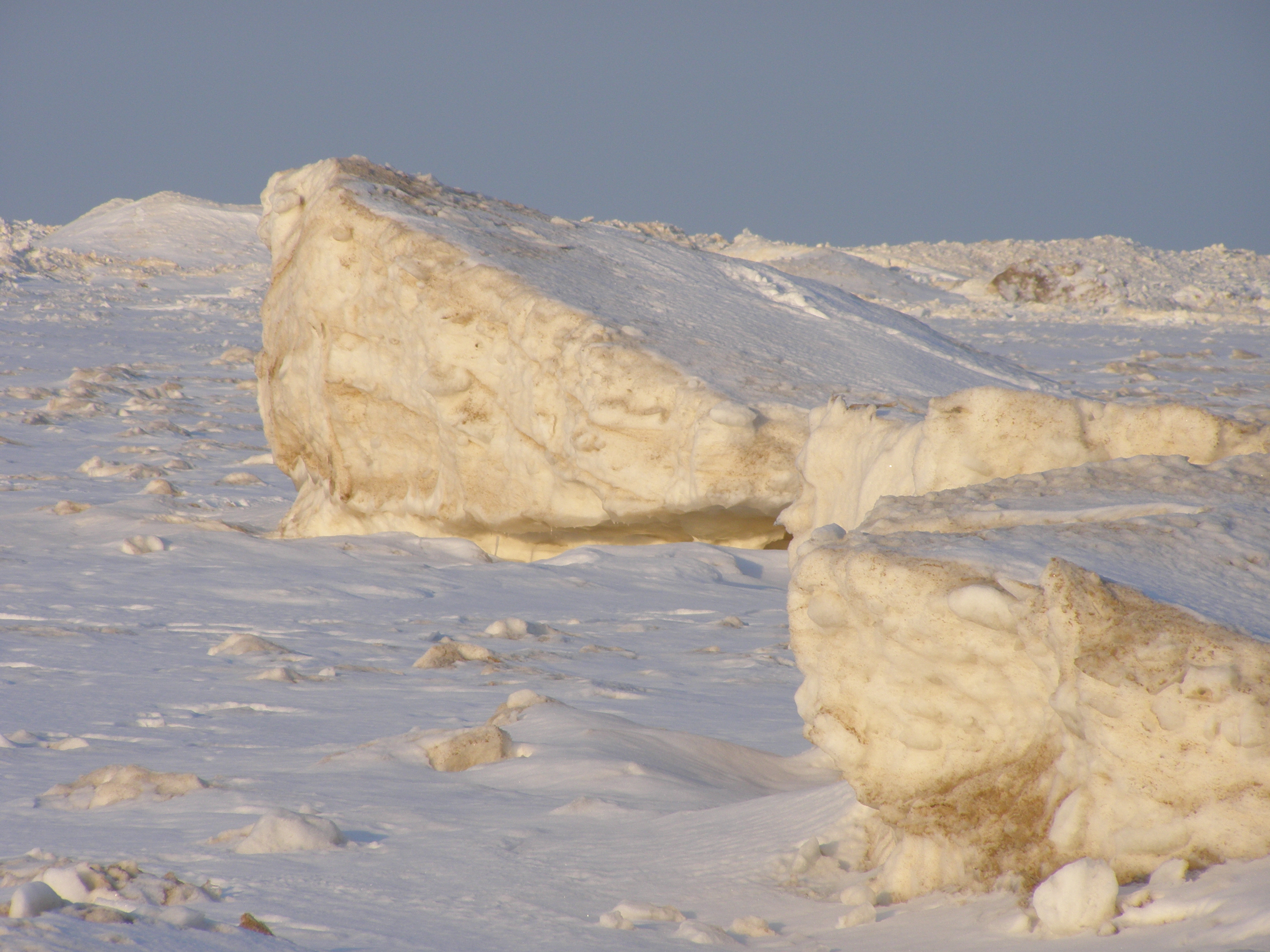
Shelf ice along the southern Lake Michigan Shoreline at Indiana Dunes National Park

Shelf ice is ice that forms when a portion of a lake surface freezes. It is often then washed upon the shore. The phenomenon is common within the Great Lakes.

== Formation ==
Shelf ice forms from float ice. Float ice is like drift ice, but seldom becomes large enough to support humans or large animals. The cold temperatures freeze small areas of the open lake, forming float ice. Similar ice will form along the shoreline when the lake is calm. Over time, the ice will build up from continued freezing on the open lake and from snow accumulation on the surface. The surface of the Great Lake seldom remains calm enough for the entire surface to freeze. However, the smaller Great Lakes, Lake Erie and Lake Ontario, as well as Lake St. Clair, will freeze over more often than the larger upper lakes. The wind pushes the float ice and creates waves which also move the ice. Over time, the ice will accumulate on the leeward shores of the lake. Like sand, which is moved by the wind and the waves, the ice begins to accumulate along the east and southern shore of Lake Michigan. When pushed onto the beach, it remains and over time, the ice accumulates on top of the beach and the ice already pushed ashore.

On days with a strong off-shore wind, an ice sheet may reach out into the lakes as far as the eye can see. But across the lake, there is likely to be open water several miles wide.

== Structure ==
Shelf ice is a floating mat of ice, but unlike a pond or a small lake that freezes over, the shelf is not a uniform sheet of ice. Created by the wind and waves, the shelf ice is a jumble of ice chunks, pushed onto each other. It is as if you took a pile of rubble and pushed up against a wall. The more you push, the narrow the pile becomes, and it rises in a ridge. But there is nothing stable in the pile. The individual pieces (ice in the case of shelf ice) are not initially connected; they only float upon the water surface and rest upon each other. Many become jammed together but throughout the structure, there are pockets of air. Since each piece of ice developed independently, each is of a different thickness, creating variations in strength, density, and depth.

Over time, the 'shelf' extends out from the shore in a long-lasting floating ledge. The ledge can become very thick depending on the size of the ice pieces and the size of the air pockets. The ice sheet can be stabilized by grounding on shore or lake bottom, through additional freezing from seaspray, precipitation and undersurface ice formation and through melt/refreezing cycles from solar heating and weather variations. Therefore, an ice shelf can vary from a large flat surface to a jumbled pile of blocks with parallel ridges.

When a 'shelf' extends out to a sand bar, a ridge will form that is higher than the rest of the shelf. If there is more than one sand bar along a beach front, the ice shelf will form a ridge along each sand bar.

== Dangers ==
Because of the uneven surface and possible air holes throughout shelf ice, the ice may give way unexpectedly. One can plummet several feet through an air pocket into open water. Self rescue is difficult due to the friability of the ice and the rate at which the cold water will sap energy.

== Gallery ==
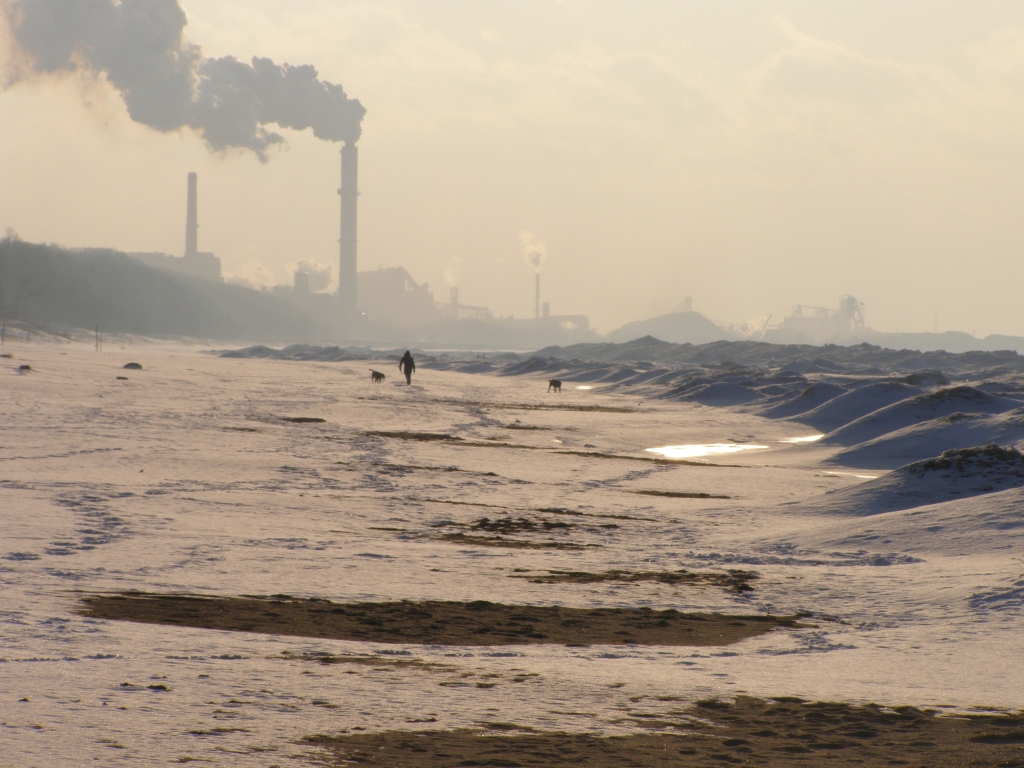
Southern Lake Michigan beach in winter at Indiana Dunes National Park

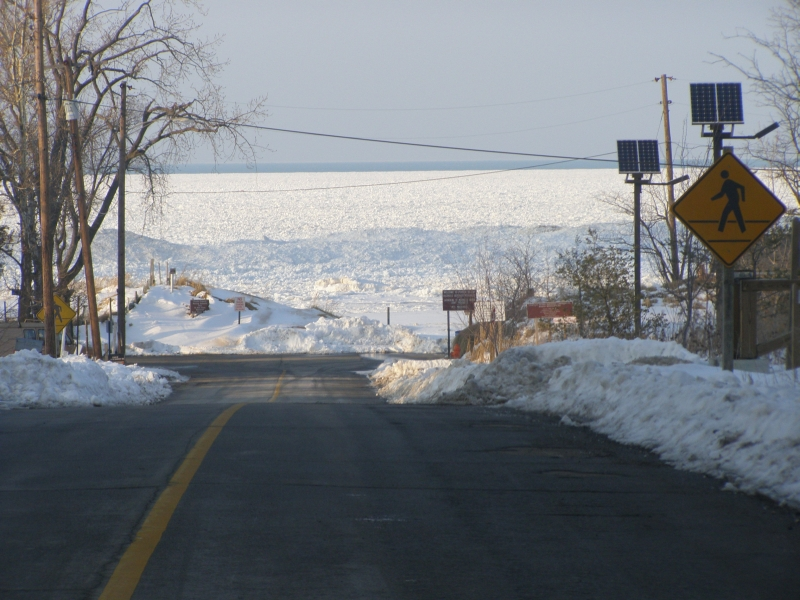
An unbroken stretch of shelf ice at Indiana Dunes National Park

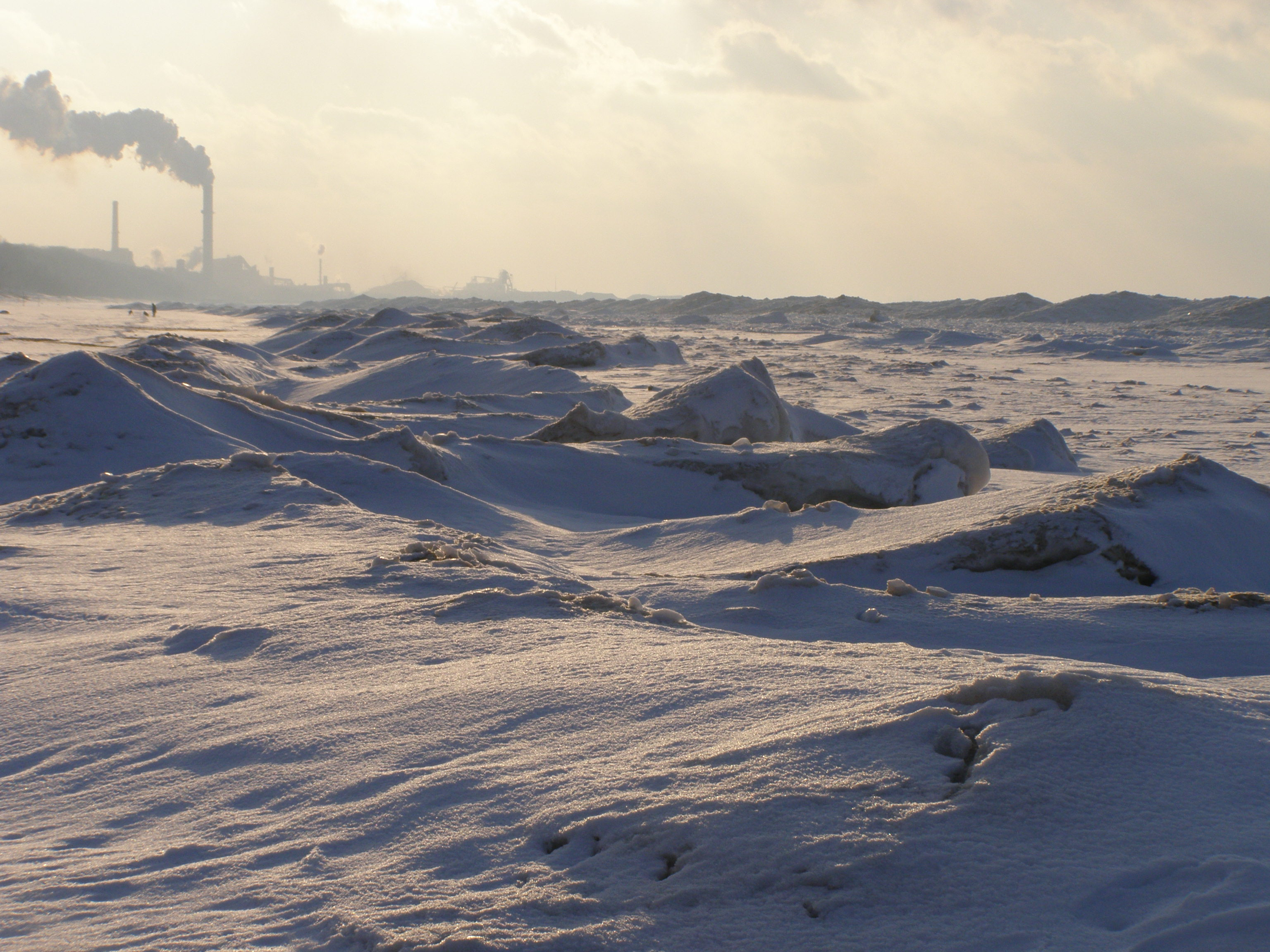
Ridges of shelf ice along Lake Michigan's southern shore at Indiana Dunes National Park

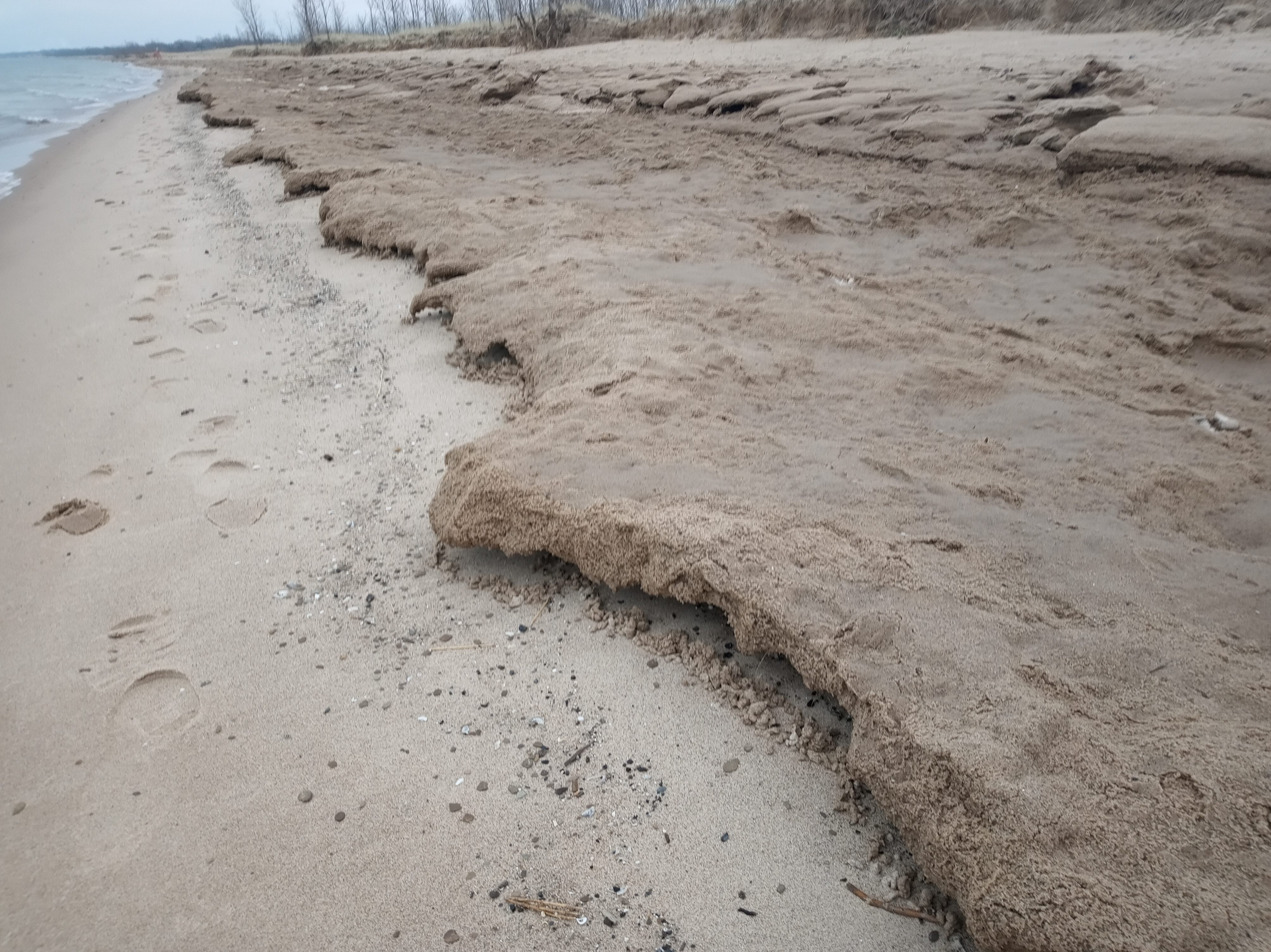
Remnant shelf ice covered with sand and undergoing gradual denivation on a Lake Michigan beach

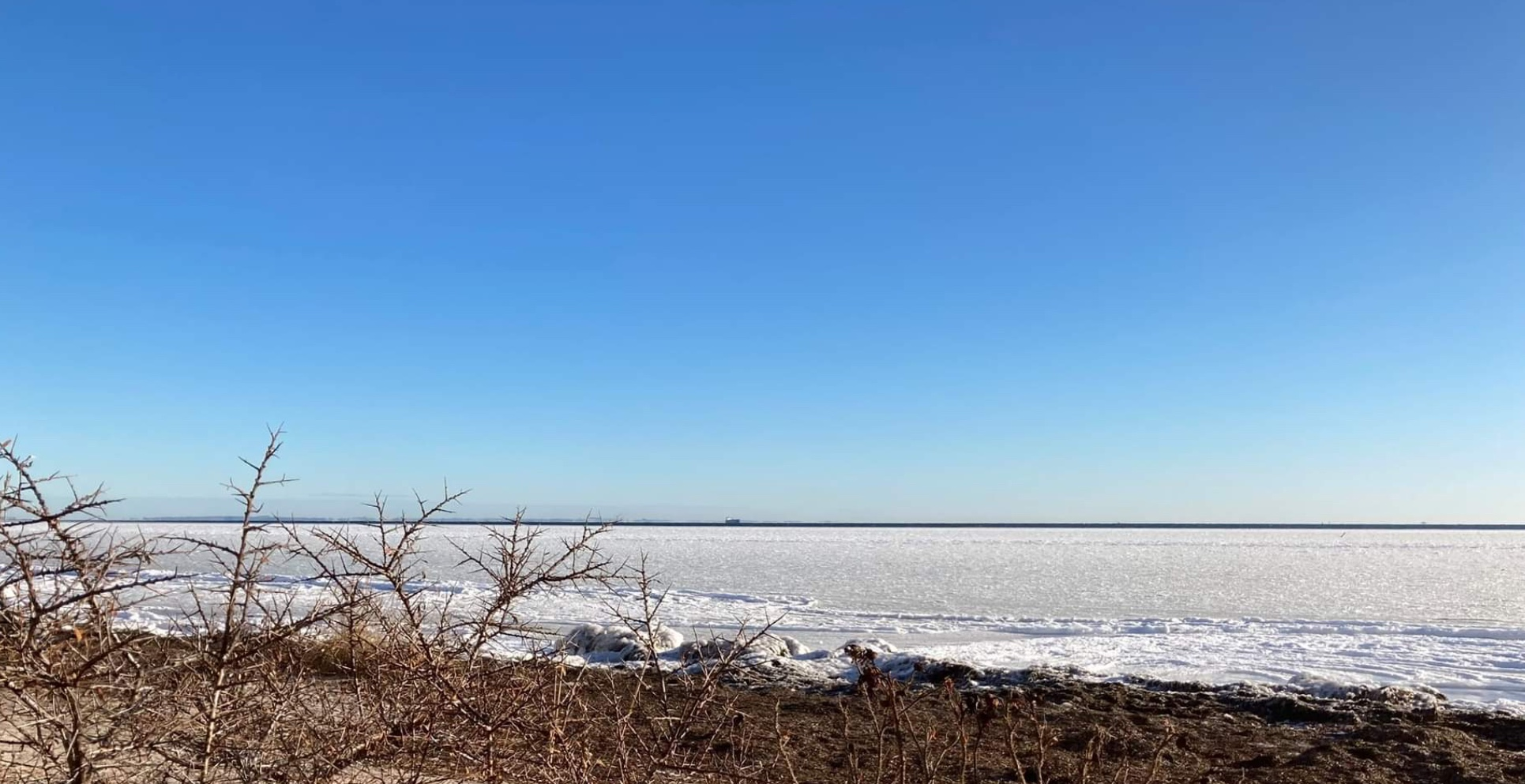
Shelf ice build up on the Sound North of Copenhagen

== See also ==
- Lake ice
