= Aptenodytes ridgeni =

Aptenodytes ridgeni Temporal range: Pliocene

Scientific classification
- Kingdom: Animalia
- Phylum: Chordata
- Class: Aves
- Order: Sphenisciformes
- Family: Spheniscidae
- Genus: Aptenodytes
- Species: †A. ridgeni

Binomial name
- †Aptenodytes ridgeni Simpson, 1972

Extinct species of bird

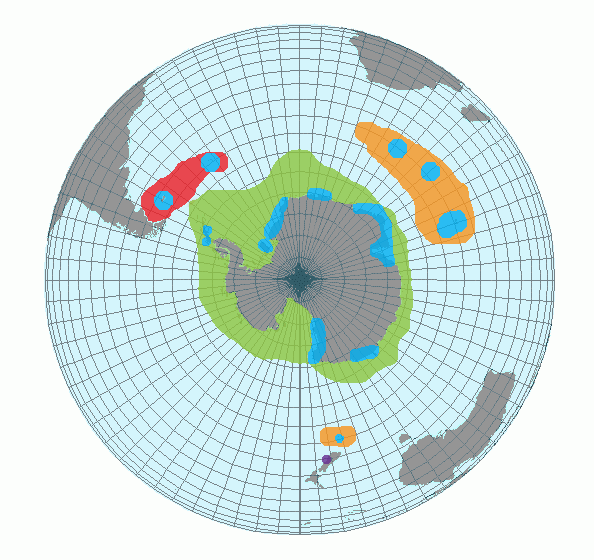
Map showing the location of Ridgen's penguin finds (purple), together with current ranges of emperor penguins (green) and king penguins (red and orange). Breeding colonies are light blue.

Aptenodytes ridgeni, also referred to as Ridgen's penguin, is an extinct species of penguin from the Pliocene of New Zealand. It was intermediate in size between its living congeners, standing an estimated 90–100 cm tall. It is known from fossil bones, including complete leg bones, found at Motunau Beach, north of Christchurch, by 11-year-old Alan Ridgen in 1968.

A fossil skull from South Taranaki was described in 2025 and, while it could belong to Aptenodytes ridgeni, there was no overlap between the skull and the leg bones from the Motunau fossil, so it was assigned to Aptenodytes without determination as to whether it was A. ridgeni or a new species.
