= Nanjing Underwater World =

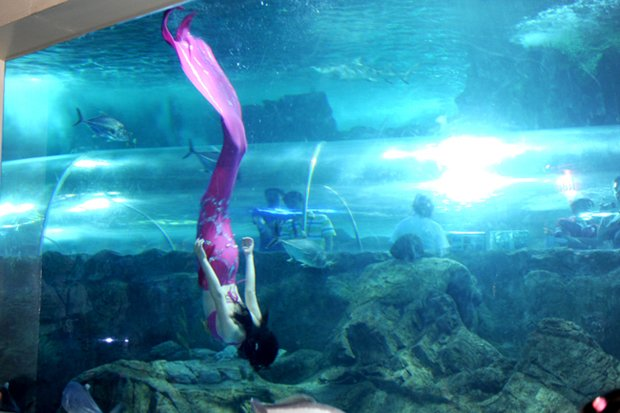
- Undersea Mermaid
- Interactive map of Nanjing Underwater World
- 32.0552902°N 118.8394459°E
- Date opened: 1996
- Location: Nanjing, Jiangsu
- Land area: 34,000 square metres (8.4 acres)
- Volume of largest tank: 4,000 m^{3} (1,100,000 US gal)
- Website: www.nuww.com.cn

Nanjing Underwater World (Chinese: 南京海底世界有限公司) is an aquarium near the Sun Yat-sen Mausoleum in Nanjing. Underwater World is on the south side of Purple Mountain within walking distance of the Ming Xiaoling Mausoleum. The aquarium is a joint venture between Andover Capital Group and the Administration Bureau of Dr. Sun Yat-Sen’s Mausoleum.

== History ==
Underwater World is a joint venture between Andover Capital Group and the Nanjing government. It is run by the manager of the Sun Yat-sen Mausoleum, and opened in 1996. The aquarium covers 16,000-square-meter (170,000 sq ft) of the 34,000-square-meter (8.4-acre) and is four stories tall. The 1000 seat Dolphinarium covers an area of 1,500 square meters (16,000 sq ft). The total investment was about 200,000,000 yuan.

In 2004, the Aquarium and the Dolphinarium were combined into one integrated venue.

== Exhibits ==
Underwater World has almost 10,000 animals representing 200 species.

=== Ocean Tank ===
The ocean tank at the aquarium contains 4,000 cubic meters (1,100,000 U.S. gal) and is home to more than 100 species of sea creatures. Visitors walk thorough a 180-degree transparent acrylic tunnel, 74 meters (243 ft) long, 3 meters (9.8 ft) wide, and 2.4 meters (7 ft 10 in) high.

=== Polar Region ===
Under the support of the Polar Exploration Office of China Marine Bureau, Polar Region displays animals from the polar regions. Visitors experience the environment and scenery of the coldest parts of the world. Photographs of Chinese expeditions to the Polar Regions are exhibited as well.

=== Science Education Hall ===
The Science Education Hall displays things that are made by most advanced technology, as well as some precious specimens of sea animals. It contains five exhibition sections:

=== Shell and Fossil Zone ===
The Shell and Fossil Zone has sea shells and fossils, including the well-known dinosaur egg fossil, which comes from 130,000,000 years ago.

=== Computer Interactive Zone ===
The Computer Interactive Zone uses multimedia to let visitors learn about the mystery in the underwater world.

=== Giant Insect Park ===
Giant Insect Park introduced some exhibits from a large park of the same name in the United States. By using advanced computer technology, to imitate the daily life of some giant insects in the forest.

=== Underwater Leisure Square ===
The Underwater Leisure Square consists of a food mall and the Ocean Souvenir Supermarket.

== See also ==
- List of tourist attractions in China
