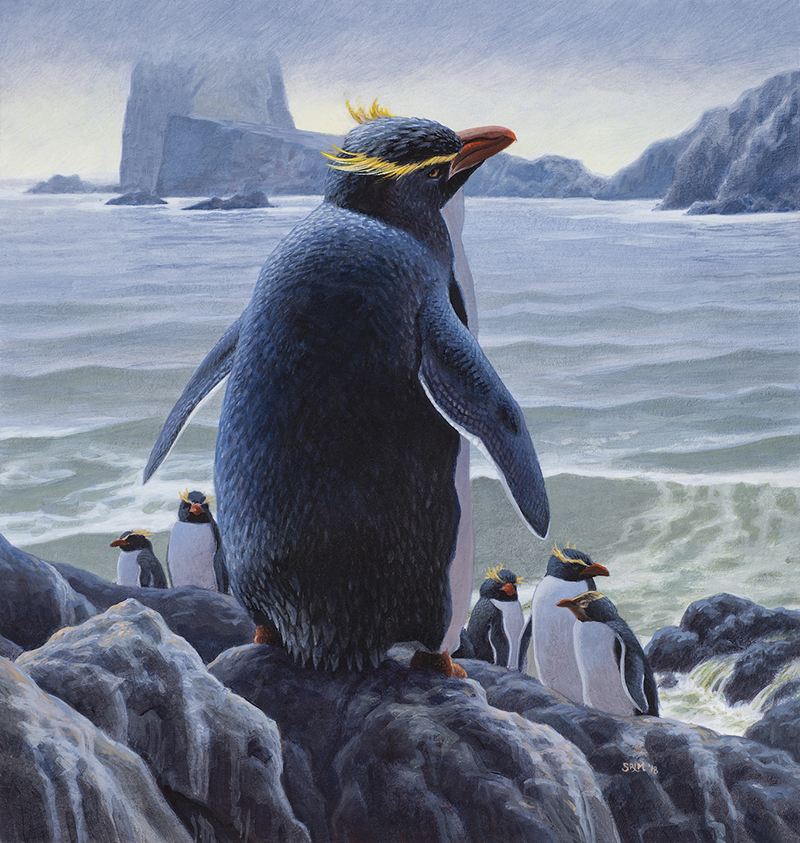
- Reconstruction by Sean Murtha

Conservation status
- Extinct (1650–1700) (NZ TCS)

Scientific classification
- Kingdom: Animalia
- Phylum: Chordata
- Class: Aves
- Order: Sphenisciformes
- Family: Spheniscidae
- Genus: Eudyptes
- Species: †E. warhami

Binomial name
- †Eudyptes warhami Cole, Tennyson, Ksepka & Thomas, 2019

= Eudyptes warhami =

Eudyptes warhami Temporal range: Late Holocene

Extinct species of bird

Eudyptes warhami, the Chatham penguin, Chatham crested penguin, Chatham Islands penguin, or Warham's penguin, is an extinct species of crested penguin previously endemic to the Chatham Islands of New Zealand. It is known only from subfossil bones and probably became extinct within 150–200 years after Polynesians arrived in the Chatham Islands around 1500 CE.

== Discovery and description ==
Bones of crested penguins (genus Eudyptes) have been recorded from subfossil deposits on main Chatham Island for years. They had been identified as Fiordland or erect-crested penguins, but Tennyson and Millener noted in 1994 they differed from both those species, and probably represented a species of crested penguin endemic to the Chatham Islands. It was referred to as the "Chatham Island crested penguin", but not formally described and named.

As part of a study of the recent evolution of numerous penguin species, subfossil bones from Chatham Island and the mainland had mitochondrial DNA fully extracted, sequenced, and compared to other species of Eudyptes. The Chatham bones differed sufficiently in their DNA to support the penguin's identity as a truly distinct species, and it was formally described in 2019 and named E. warhami, after John Warham, a pioneering researcher in penguin biology. Based on a comparison of mitochondrial genomes, this species diverged from its closest relative, the erect-crested penguin of the Antipodes Islands, between 1.1 and 2.5 million years ago. This corresponds to the emergence of the Chatham Islands from the sea about 3 million years ago.

== Range ==
The Chatham penguin was endemic to the Chatham Islands.

Bones of the Chatham penguin have been identified from various subfossil and archaeological sites on mainland New Zealand, including the Wairarapa, Banks Peninsula, Marlborough, and Paekākāriki areas. These likely represent stray birds from the Chatham islands arriving on the mainland, not breeding populations. Similarly, the erect-crested penguin was among the subfossil Eudyptes bones from the Chatham Islands, which also likely represent strays.

== Extinction ==
The Chatham Islands were settled by Polynesians around 1500 CE, and the Chatham penguin was probably hunted to extinction within 150–200 years along with many other bird species and one species of sea lion. It was almost certainly extinct before Europeans arrived to the Chatham Islands. There has been a suggestion, however, the species persisted as recently as the late 19th century, because a crested penguin from the Chathams is recorded as being kept captive for several weeks around 1871 or 1872. Its species was noted as "Eudyptes pachyrhynchus", the modern scientific name for the Fiordland penguin. At the time, the name could also refer to the Snares penguin (E. robustus) and the erect-crested penguin (E. sclateri). Crested penguin species are in fact regular, possibly even annual, visitors to the Chatham Islands. At least three species are recorded from there: Snares penguins, erect-crested penguins, and a member of the rockhopper penguin group. The captured bird was likely one of these three.
