= Eudyptes atatu =

†Eudyptes atatu Temporal range: Pliocene

Scientific classification
- Kingdom: Animalia
- Phylum: Chordata
- Class: Aves
- Order: Sphenisciformes
- Family: Spheniscidae
- Genus: Eudyptes
- Species: †E. atatu

Binomial name
- †Eudyptes atatu Thomas et al, 2020

Extinct species of crested penguin

Eudyptes atatu is an extinct species of crested penguin that lived during the Pliocene epoch around 3.2 million years ago. It is considered the first stem species of the crested penguin genus. Eudyptes atatu is thought to have inhabited what is now New Zealand. The bird's existence has been cited as evidence supporting the idea that penguins originated in Zealandia before spreading across the Southern Hempishere.

== Etymology ==
The generic term Eudyptes derives from Ancient Greek, and translates to "fine diver" in English. The species name atatu is a contraction between the words "ata" and "tū" from the Te Reo Maori language, meaning "dawn". "Dawn" refers to the species' place within the fossil record, representing the beginning of the crested penguin lineage in New Zealand.

== Description ==
Eudyptes atatu was close in size to the modern erect-crested penguin, which measures at around 60 cm long. As with other crested penguins, sexual dimorphism is fairly prominent.

The main property that distinguishes Eudyptes atatu from modern crested penguins is its comparatively slender mandible. Deep mandibles, as seen in modern Eudyptes, are thought to be an adaptation facilitating easier predation of krill and other small planktonic organisms. The lack of this feature in Eudyptes atatu suggests it had a different diet than its extant descendants.

== See also ==
- List of bird species described in the 2020s
