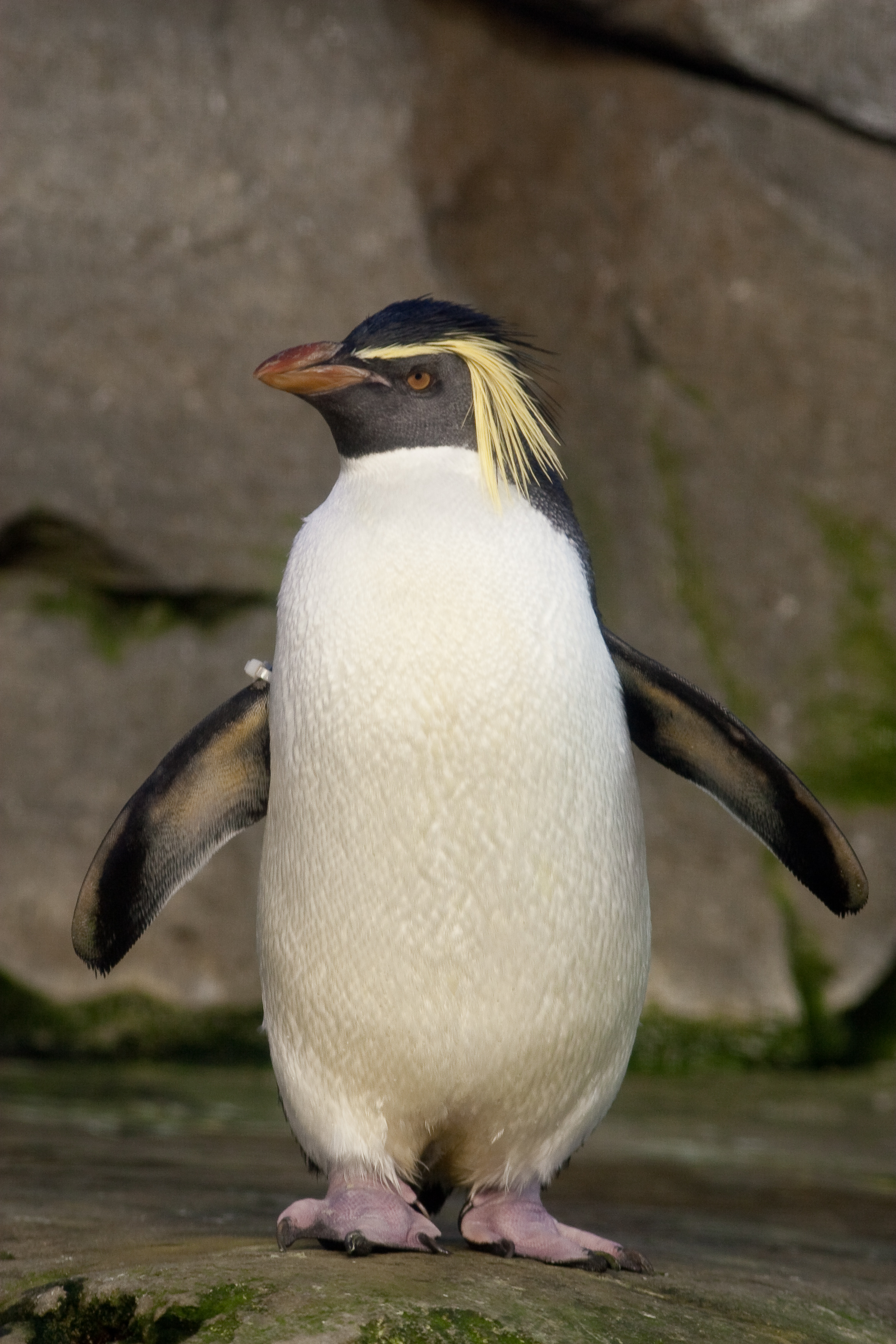
- At Berlin Zoological Garden, Germany

Conservation status
- Endangered (IUCN 3.1)

Scientific classification
- Kingdom: Animalia
- Phylum: Chordata
- Class: Aves
- Order: Sphenisciformes
- Family: Spheniscidae
- Genus: Eudyptes
- Species: E. moseleyi

Binomial name
- Eudyptes moseleyi Mathews & Iredale, 1921
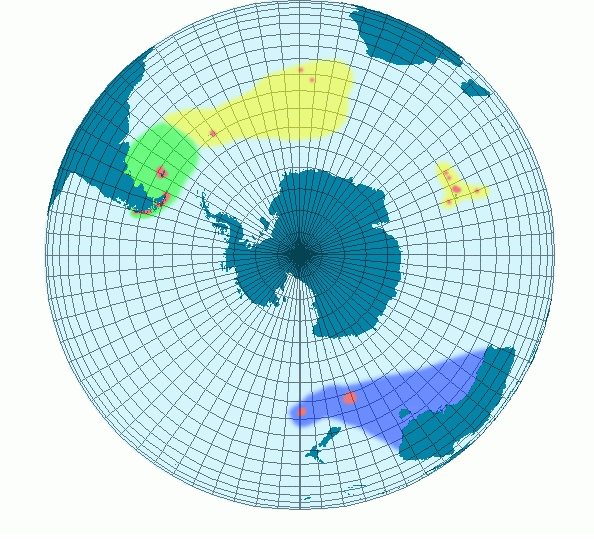
- Distribution map of northern rockhopper penguin in yellow

= Northern rockhopper penguin =

Northern rockhopper penguin Temporal range: Pleistocene to recent

Species of bird

The northern rockhopper penguin (Eudyptes moseleyi), also known as Moseley's rockhopper penguin, Moseley's penguin, or Tristan penguin, is a penguin species native to the southern Indian and Atlantic Oceans. It was formerly considered conspecific with the eastern and western rockhopper penguins.

A study published in 2009 showed that the population of the northern rockhopper had declined by 90% since the 1950s. For this reason, the northern rockhopper penguin is classified as endangered.

== Taxonomy ==
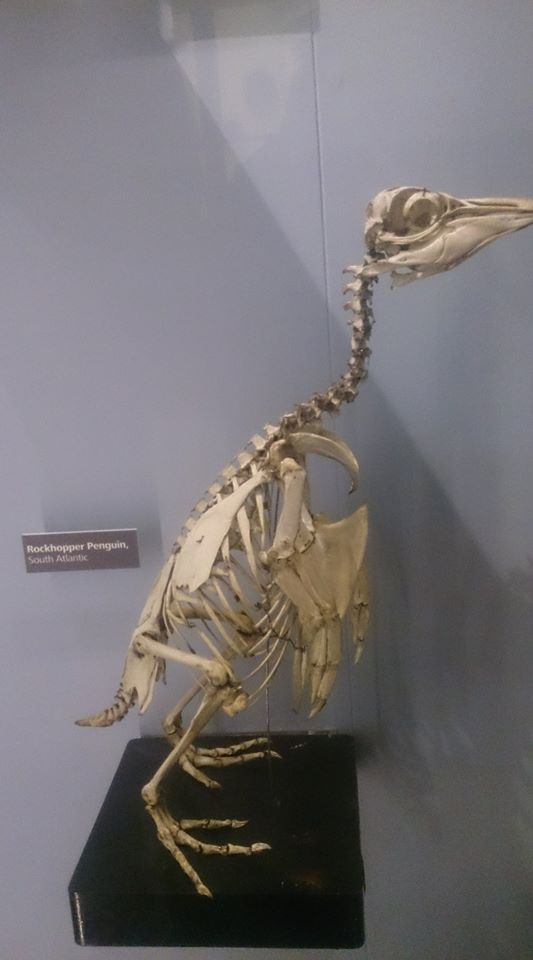
Rockhopper penguin skeleton in Manchester Museum

The rockhopper penguins have been considered to consist of two species, northern and southern rockhopper penguin, since research published in 2006 demonstrated morphological, vocal, and genetic differences between the two populations. The latter species was itself later split into the eastern rockhopper penguin and the western rockhopper penguin. Molecular datings suggest that the genetic divergence between the northern and the two southern species of rockhopper penguin may have been caused by a vicariant event caused by a shift in the position of the Subtropical Front during the mid-Pleistocene climate transition. Analysis of a part of a mitochondrial control region from a northern rockhopper penguin found on the Kerguelen Islands showed that it may have come from Gough Island, 6,000 km away, and that the southern and northern rockhoppers are genetically separate, though some individuals may disperse from their breeding colonies. Northern rockhopper penguin is now widely recognized as a distinct species.

== Distribution and habitat ==
More than 99% of northern rockhoppers breed during late spring or early summer on Tristan da Cunha and Gough Island in the south Atlantic Ocean. Breeding colonies are also found on the French Southern and Antarctic Lands of Amsterdam Island and St Paul Island.

It is very rare for the bird to make landfall on the Australian continent, but in 2006, a northern rockhopper was sighted at Robe, South Australia, and in July 2023 a very underweight northern rockhopper was found at Goolwa beach in South Australia.

== Genetic variation and morphology ==
The rockhopper penguin (Eudyptes chrysocome) was split into three distinct subspecies in 1992; the southern, (E. c. chrysocome), eastern (E. c. filholi) and northern rockhopper penguin (E. c. moseleyi). The three subspecies are distinguished by differences in the length of the tassels of the crests, the size and colour of the fleshy margin of the gape, colour pattern on the underside of the flipper and differences in the size of the superciliary stripe in front of the eye. Additionally, the northern rockhopper penguin is larger than the other two subspecies. Proof that the three subspecies were truly different, in terms of more than reproductive isolation and some morphological features, was found in the mitochondrial sequences of the three species. It was found E. c. filholi and E. c. chrysocome were not as different genetically as E. c. moseleyi was to the other two subspecies. The level of genetic differentiation was similar to the genetic difference found in other penguin subspecies groups.

Another way that scientists were able to differentiate the different subspecies of rockhoppers were in the parasites that fed off each separate rockhopper penguin species. Penguins are parasitised by 15 species of chewing lice in two genera, Austrogoniodes and the monotypic Nesiotinus. Within rockhopper penguins, the host-specific louse Austrogoniodes keleri is present only on southern rockhoppers; the multi-host Austrogoniodes concii parasitises only northern rockhoppers and Austrogoniodes hamiltoni parasitises only eastern rockhoppers. Cross contamination of the lice is not possible naturally due to the fact that chewing lice have limited mobility and heavily rely on their host for survival, meaning that the lice can only be transmitted across species by way of close physical contact.

== Ecology and reproduction ==
=== Food and feeding ===
The northern rockhopper penguin feeds on krill and other sea life such as crustaceans, squid, octopus and fish.

=== Reproduction ===
It breeds in colonies in a range of locations from sea level or on cliff sides, to sometimes inland. The Northern form, found in Amsterdam and Gough island, is reproductively isolated from the Crozet and Kerguelen islands. They are monophyletic; meaning they have a split in the mitochondria DNA trees which forms two subspecies: the northern and southern rockhopper penguin. Another interesting difference between the two subspecies is their mating ritual. They both use different songs and head ornaments in their mating signals. The reproductive isolation has led to not only physical difference but also behavioral. The adults feed their chicks lower trophic level prey than they themselves consume. During breeding season the adults eat zooplankton and then transition to fish, showing they favor future reproduction.

=== Population and threats ===
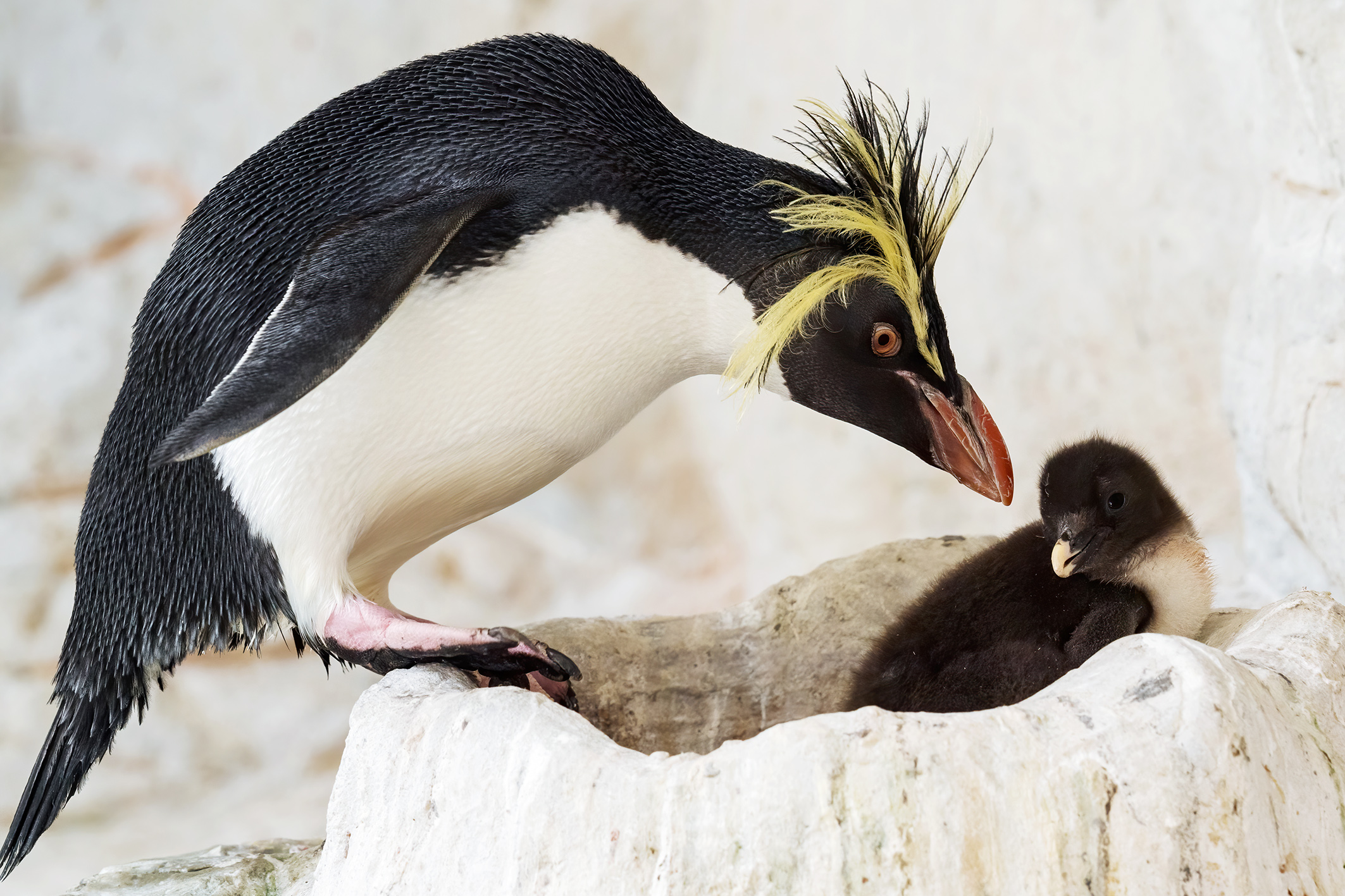
Northern rockhopper penguins in Tiergarten Schönbrunn

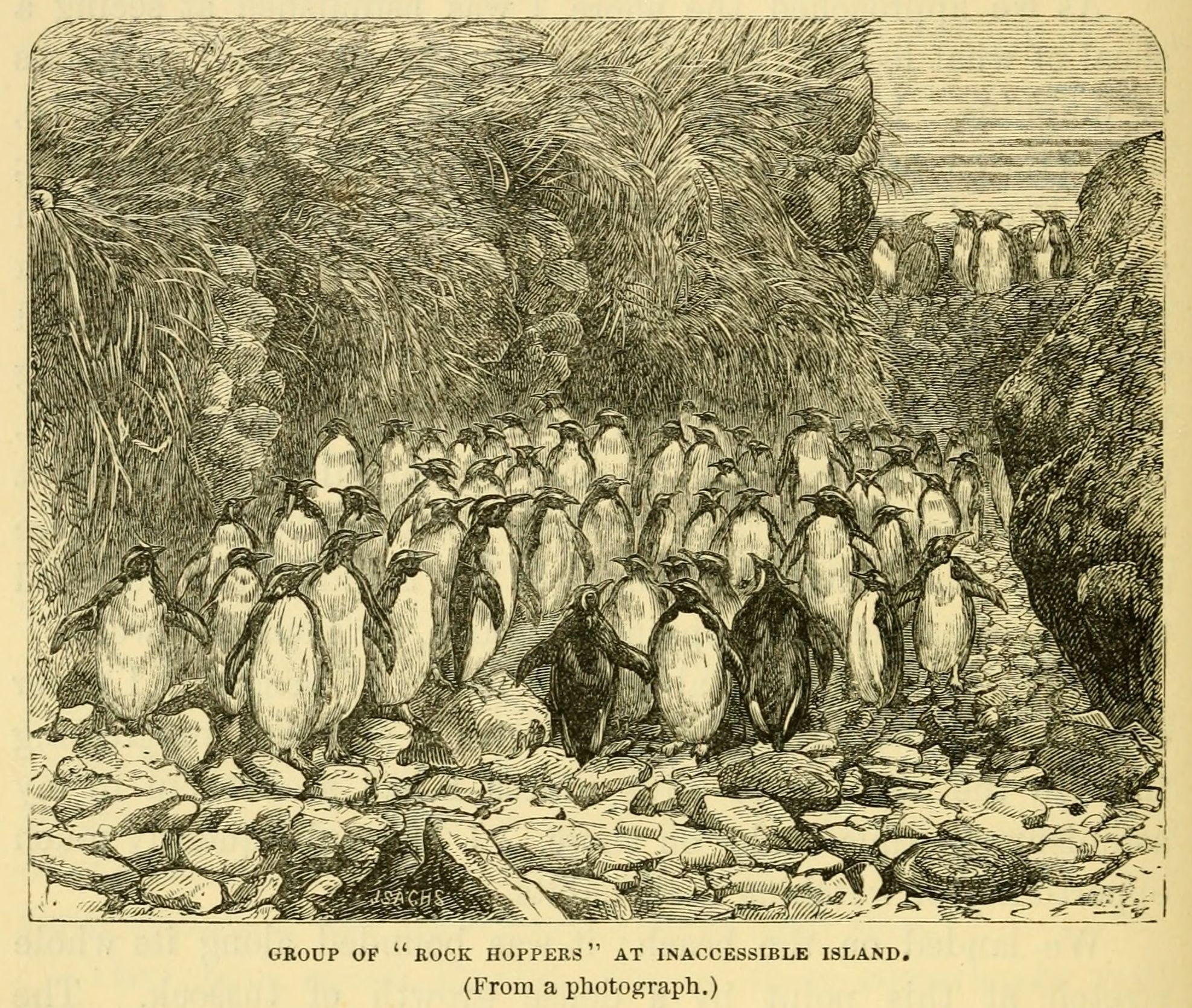
Northern rockhopper penguins on Inaccessible Island, drawn by the naturalist aboard HMS Challenger

The current population is estimated to be between 100,000–499,999 breeding pairs at Gough Island, 18,000 to 27,000 pairs at Inaccessible Island, and 3,200 to 4,500 at Tristan da Cunha. In the Indian Ocean, the population was 25,500 pairs on Amsterdam Island, and 9,000 pairs on St Paul Island in 1993; there has been no information available on population trends there since the 1990s. Atlantic Ocean sites show a decline of 2.7% per year; the drop in the population at Gough Island has been described as equivalent to the loss of 100 birds every day since the 1950s.

A study published in 2009 showed that the world population of the northern rockhopper had declined by 90% since the 1950s, possibly because of climate change, changes in marine ecosystems and overfishing for squid and octopus by humans. Other possible factors in the decline include disturbance and pollution from ecotourism and fishing, egg-harvesting, and predation and competition from subantarctic fur seals (Arctophoca tropicalis). Surveys show that the birds are at risk of infection by goose barnacles. House mice (Mus musculus) have been introduced into their environment by human sea expeditions. The mice have proven to be invasive, and consume northern rockhopper eggs, as well as hunt their young. In order to preserve the birds, a culling of the mice is being considered. The climate change conditions alter food availability since it reduces nutrients and productivity. This causes an effect on the body mass, causing a negative impact on their reproductivity success.

The northern rockhopper penguin is classified as endangered because of the decline in numbers over the last three generations (or 30 years).

Population Trends by Year and Island

| Island | Year | Estimate |
|---|---|---|
| Gough | 1889 | "millions" |
| | 1956 | ~2 million |
| | 1979 | 78,300 |
| | 1984 | 142,800 |
| | 2004 | 32,400 |
| | 2006 | 64,700 |
| Tristan | 1824 | >200,000 |
| | 1873 | >200,000 |
| | 1923 | >12,600 |
| | 1955 | 5,000 |
| | 1973 | 7,000 |
| | 1984 | 4,300 |
| | 1992 | 3,343 |
| | 2005 | 3,421 |
| Inaccessible | 1955 | >25,000 |
| | 1989 | 22,000 |
| | 1999 | 27,000 |
| | 2004 | 18,000 |
| Nightingale | 1973 | 25,000 |
| | 2005 | 19,500 |
| Middle | 1973 | 100,000 |

=== 2011 oil spill ===
On March 16, 2011, the Maltese-registered freighter MS Oliva ran aground on Nightingale Island, spilling tons of heavy crude into the ocean. The crew was rescued, but the ship broke up, leaving an oil slick that surrounded the island, threatening its population of rockhopper penguins. Nightingale Island has no fresh water, so the penguins were transported to Tristan da Cunha for cleaning.

== In culture ==
- Cody Maverick, a northern rockhopper penguin, the main protagonist in the 2007 film Surf's Up and its sequel Surf's Up 2: WaveMania.
- In the Happy Feet and Happy Feet Two films, the Barry White-like love guru, Lovelace, is a rockhopper penguin, who will instil his wisdom for the price of rocks. Lovelace is voiced by Robin Williams.
