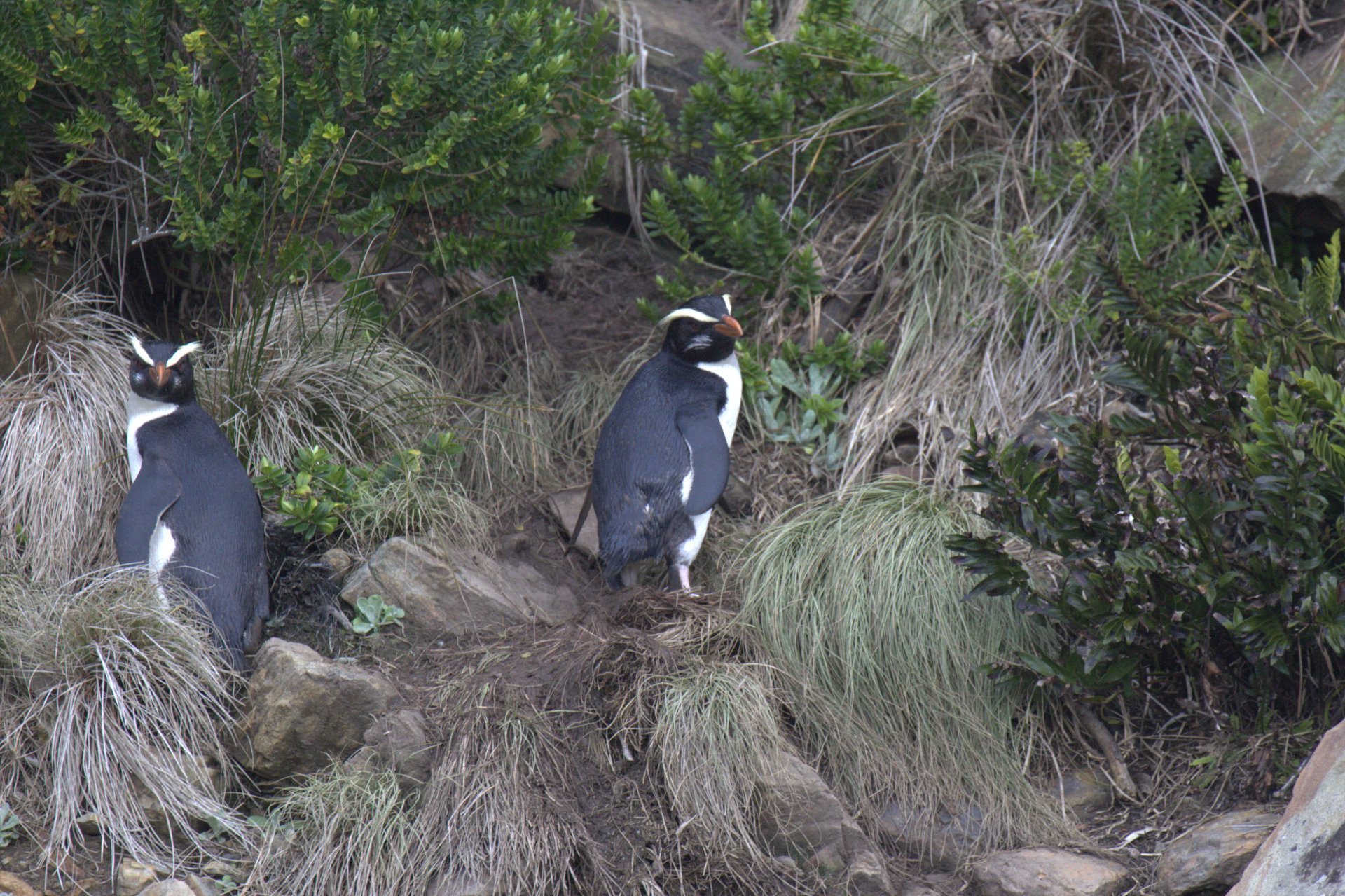

Conservation status
- Near Threatened (IUCN 3.1)

Scientific classification
- Kingdom: Animalia
- Phylum: Chordata
- Class: Aves
- Order: Sphenisciformes
- Family: Spheniscidae
- Genus: Eudyptes
- Species: E. pachyrhynchus

Binomial name
- Eudyptes pachyrhynchus G. R. Gray, 1845
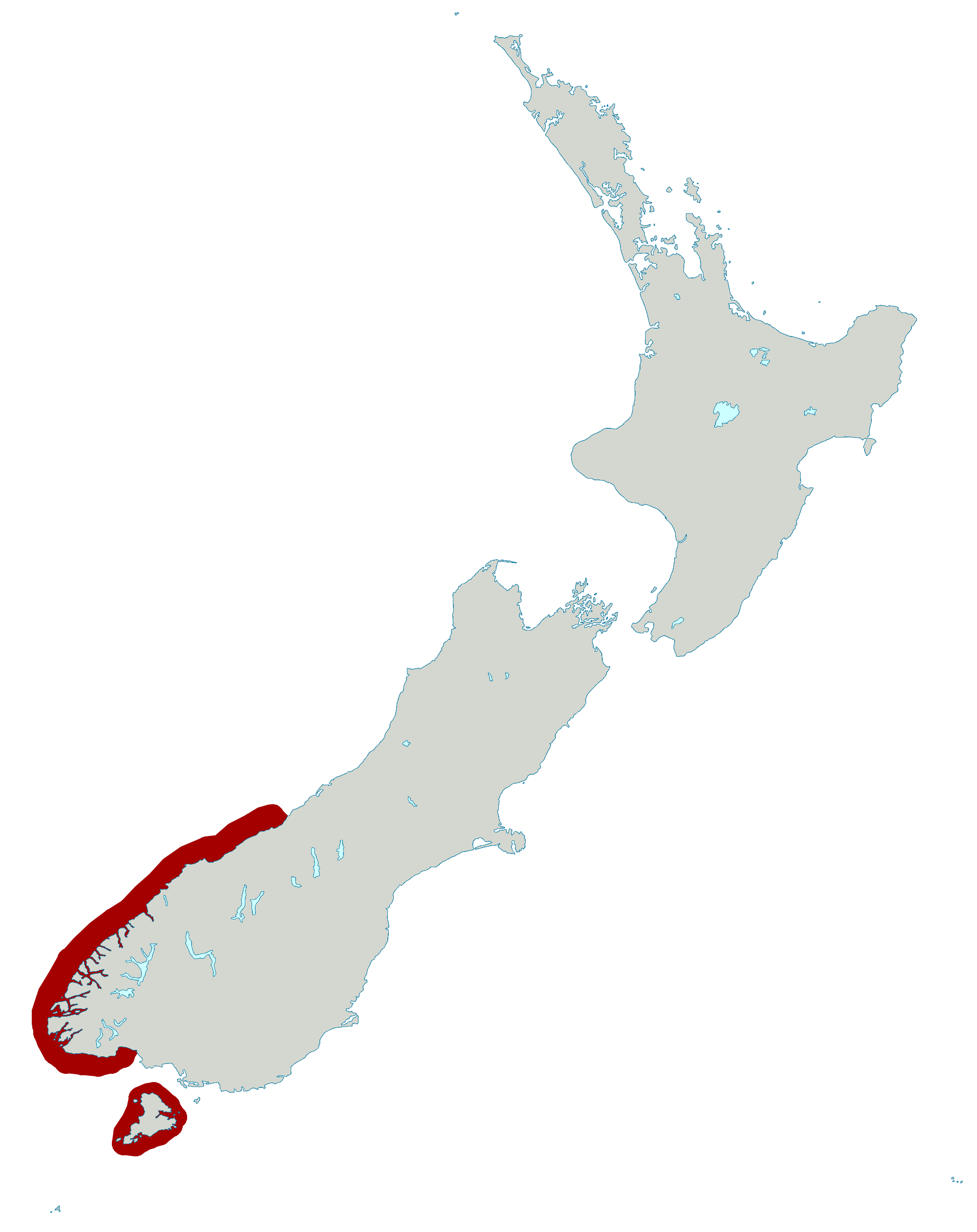
- Current breeding range

= Fiordland penguin =

Fiordland crested penguin

Species of bird

The Fiordland penguin (Eudyptes pachyrhynchus), also known as the Fiordland crested penguin (in Māori, tawaki), is a crested penguin species endemic to New Zealand. It currently breeds along the south-western coasts of New Zealand's South Island as well as on Stewart Island/Rakiura and its outlying islands. Because it originally ranged beyond Fiordland, it is sometimes referred to as the New Zealand crested penguin. It is occasionally found in Australia.

== Taxonomy ==
The Fiordland crested penguin was described in 1845 by English zoologist George Robert Gray, its specific epithet derived from the Ancient Greek pachy-/παχυ- "thick" and rhynchos/ρύγχος "beak". It is one of the four to seven species in the genus Eudyptes, the generic name derived from the Ancient Greek eu/ευ "good" and dyptes/δύπτης "diver".

== Description ==
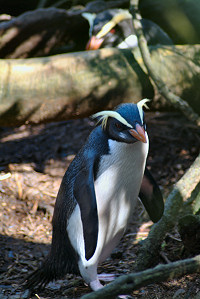
The Fiordland penquin has a prominent yellow crest on its head

This species is a medium-sized, yellow-crested, black-and-white penguin, growing to approximately 55 cm (22 in) long and weighing on average 3.5 kg (7.7 lb), with a weight range of 2 to 5 kg (4.4 to 11.0 lb). The face possesses white markings and the front is white while the head and body are black. Its broad, yellow crest begins at the base of the beak and extends over the eye, dropping down the neck. It can be distinguished from the similar erect-crested penguin (Eudyptes sclateri) and Snares penguin (Eudyptes robustus) in having no bare skin around the base of its bill. Female Fiordland penguins lay a clutch of two eggs where the first-laid egg is much smaller than the second egg, generally hatches later, and shows higher mortality, demonstrating a brood reduction system that is unique from other avian groups. The Fiordland crested penguin has a much higher breeding success than most other Eudyptes species except for the southern rockhopper penguin, even at sites with introduced and/or native predators.

== Distribution and habitat ==
This penguin nests in colonies among tree roots and rocks in dense temperate coastal forest. It breeds along the shores in the West Coast of the South Island, south of about Bruce Bay and the Open Bay Islands, around Fiordland and Foveaux Strait, and on Stewart Island/Rakiura and its outlying islands. Fossils of this species have been found as far north as the northern end of the South Island, and they probably once nested in the North Island as well. Their range drastically reduced by hunting in Polynesian times, and they are now only found in the least-populated part of New Zealand. The species was also present in Australia.

== Behaviour ==
=== Diet ===
The main prey species reported are cephalopods (85%, mainly arrow squid, Nototodarus sloanii), followed by crustaceans (13%, primarily krill, Nyctiphanes australis) and fish (2%, mainly red cod and Blue grenadier (hoki)). However, the importance of cephalopods might be exaggerated. Prey taken seems to vary between Codfish Island and northern Fiordland.

=== Foraging ecology ===
Eudyptes pachyrhynchus are split into three groups based on their location in the fjord and where they hunt, dubbed the inner-fjord, mid-fjord and outer-fjord. Outer-fjord Eudyptes pachyrhynchus make long, deep dives with descent velocities reaching higher points than that of mid-fjord individuals who forage in the upper 20 meters of the water column. In isolated populations of the species patterns in autochthonous food sources and subsidies from allochthonous resources impact the population and locally produced resources are of great importance to each and every colony.

=== Predators and avoidance ===
When researching the Eudyptes pachyrhynchus nest searches may cause temporary abandonment leaving opportunities for predation when the searched are done in the first half of the incubation period. Domestic dogs prove to be great threats to the species with conservation campaigns encouraging dogs to be leashed at all times near habitats that Eudyptes pachyrhynchus occupies in order to aid the threatened population.

=== Reproductive and incubation habits ===
Reproductive and incubation habits of Fiordland crested penguins (Eudyptes pachyrhynchus) are not heavily researched however they provide an important view of the life cycles and reproductive success rates. Reproductive behaviours alter both feeding habits and intraspecies interactions due to courting behaviours and protective strategies employed by the parents of the chicks. Except for during the reproductive and incubatory periods Fiordland crested penguins tend to travel alone and are nocturnal creatures during their entire life.

Considered sexually mature at around 5 to 6 years post birth Eudyptes pachyrhynchus proceed to participate in their first breeding cycle. After 4 months at sea breeding birds form small groups at the height of winter and breed annually from July to December coming ashore for around 20 weeks before the chick leaves. The breeding period coincides with the greatest food availability in order to support energy needs of reproductive behaviours and reproduction. Display behaviours involve attitudes where the flippers and crests are prominent as well as loud vocalizations. Display vocalizations include a series of loud barks and braying sounds unlike the short high bark used for a contact call. Levels of oestradiol and testosterone in females and males respectively increase during courtship and decline to low level by the time eggs are laid however progesterone though highest during courtship remained at high levels post egg laying and incubation. Each clutch features two eggs with the second being larger.

Eudyptes pachyrhynchus nest in small scattered groups across steep slopes covered by rainforests that protect them from extreme temperatures and on open coast sites such as Jackson Head. Fidelity to an egg site assists the reproductive success with no significant difference in nest fidelity between sexes. Though viewed as a monogamous group, failure to raise a chick can result in increased separation rates. The incubation period lasts for 31–36 days and both parents take long shifts with the male guardian for three weeks while the female feeds the hatchling near daily. A failed reproductive cycle increases the likelihood of a male to return to a previous nest site decreasing their likelihood of mate fidelity however they still have greater rates of fidelity than other penguins in the same group. Heavy rainfall and frequent storms play a large role in loss of offspring while if both eggs are hatched the larger one is favoured leading to increased mortality rates of the smaller penguins due to starvation.

First laid eggs of Eudyptes penguins tend to possess features for a brood reduction system despite a lack of association with aggressive behavior or nest crowding the first eggs continue to experience a greater rate of mortality than second eggs. Most deaths occurred in the laying period rather and those that were laid first hatched at a later date than the second laid egg with the first despite being hatched later being smaller than the second laid egg. Once the chick is ready to join a crèche at around 21 to 28 days old it is fed by both parents until it leaves for the sea at around 75 days old with the parents following behind shortly. Adults molt once a year often in their nest after 60 to 80 days at sea and fast for around 25 days before the new plumage is grown enough to return to feeding. During the fasting period of egg formation the amount of nutrients transferred to eggs was decreased in comparison to the amount of body reserves with the interval between yolk completion and laying being 4 to 9 days with the first yolk growing for several days before the second yolk began the growth process. During chick rearing the Eudyptes pachyrhynchus penguins shift to central-place foraging strategies as they depend on reliable access to prey while avoiding straying too far from suitable nesting habitats.

When in captivity and exposed to concerts such as in Melbourne zoo time spent preening and interacting with their habitats was decreased in favour of spending time in the pool or using a nest. Post breeding period Eudyptes pachyrhynchus head south-west before splitting towards one of two trip destinations with those leaving in late November going towards the subtropical front and those leaving in December heading towards the sub-Antarctic front. Sub-Antarctic front travelling individuals were most impacted by factors due to the sea level, the surface current and the water depth while those travelling to the subtropical front were more impacted by the sea surface temperature and the concentration of chlorophyll a.

== Conservation ==
Fiordland crested penguins are classed as near threatened by the IUCN, and their status was changed from vulnerable to endangered by the Department of Conservation in 2013. Surveys in the 1990s counted 2,500 pairs, though this was likely an underestimate; based on historic trends, the population is probably continuing to decline. The main threats are introduced predators such as dogs, cats, rats, and especially stoats. They are also vulnerable to human disturbance, fleeing nests and leaving chicks exposed to predators.
