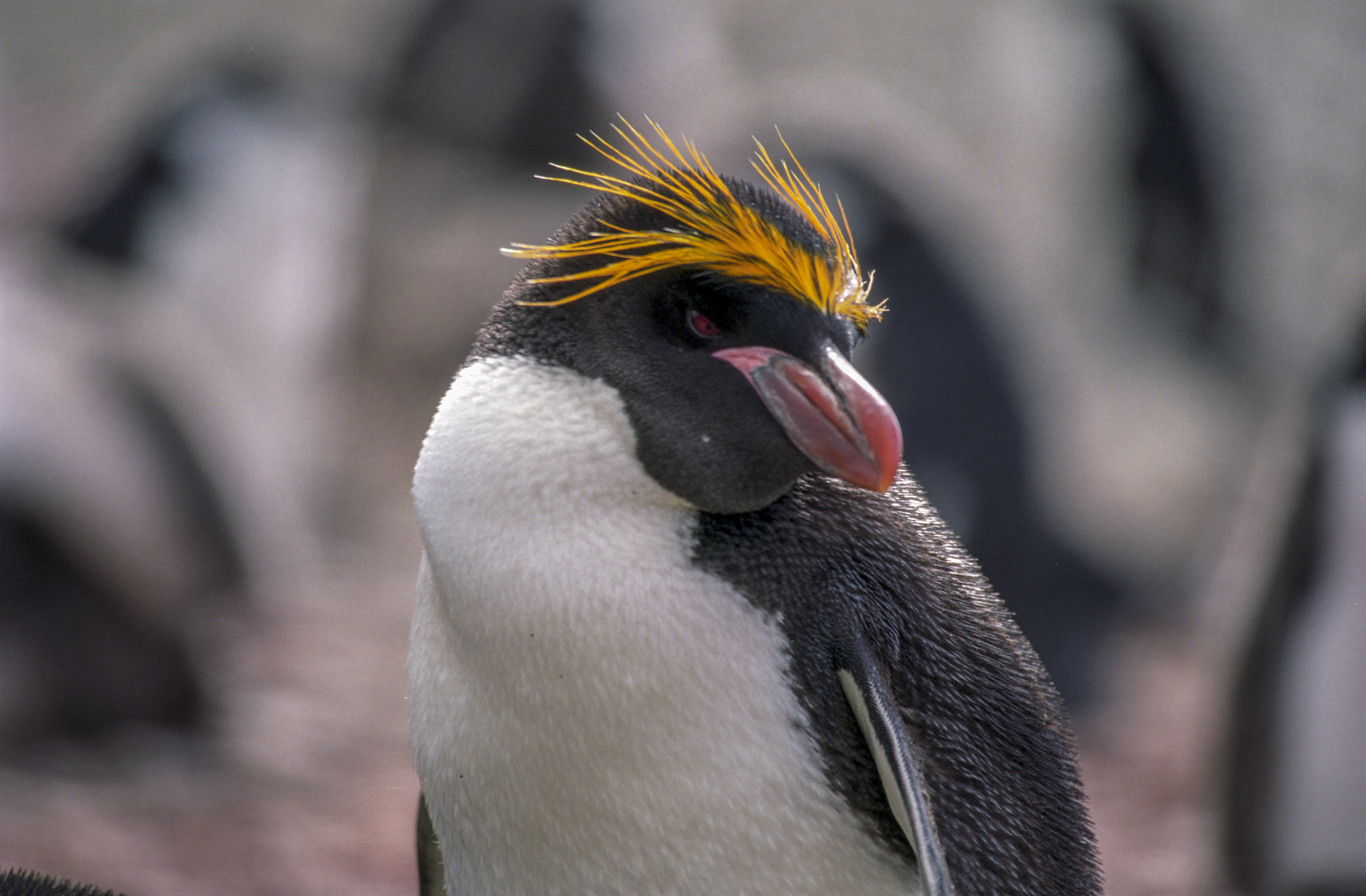
- Macaroni penguin, Eudyptes chrysolophus

Scientific classification
- Kingdom: Animalia
- Phylum: Chordata
- Class: Aves
- Order: Sphenisciformes
- Family: Spheniscidae
- Genus: Eudyptes; Vieillot, 1816

Type species
- Aptenodytes chrysocome

Species
- Eudyptes chrysocome Eudyptes chrysolophus Eudyptes moseleyi Eudyptes filholi Eudyptes pachyrhynchus Eudyptes robustus Eudyptes schlegeli Eudyptes sclateri †Eudyptes warhami †Eudyptes calauina †Eudyptes atatu

= Crested penguin =

Crested penguin Temporal range: Miocene to present

Genus of birds

Eudyptes (from Ancient Greek εὖ (eû), meaning "true, well", and δύπτης (dúptes), meaning "diver", and thus, "true diver") is a genus of penguins whose members are collectively called crested penguins. The exact number of species in the genus varies between four and eight depending on the authority, and a Chatham Islands species became extinct in recent centuries. All are black and white penguins with yellow crests, red bills and eyes, and are found on Subantarctic islands in the world's southern oceans. All lay two eggs, but raise only one young per breeding season; the first egg laid is substantially smaller than the second.

== Taxonomy ==
The genus Eudyptes was introduced by the French ornithologist Louis Pierre Vieillot in 1816; the name is derived from the Ancient Greek words eu meaning "fine", and dyptes meaning "diver". The type species was designated as the western rockhopper penguin by George Robert Gray in 1840.

The genus contains eight exant species:

- Macaroni penguin, Eudyptes chrysolophus
- Royal penguin, Eudyptes schlegeli
- Northern rockhopper penguin, Eudyptes moseleyi (formerly a subspecies of E. chrysocome)
- Eastern rockhopper penguin, Eudyptes filholi (formerly a subspecies of E. chrysocome)
- Western rockhopper penguin, Eudyptes chrysocome (Formerly southern rockhopper penguin before split)
- Fiordland penguin, Eudyptes pachyrhynchus
- Snares penguin, Eudyptes robustus
- Erect-crested penguin, Eudyptes sclateri

Also a fossil species:

- Chatham penguin, Eudyptes warhami (extinct)

Eudyptes warhami is known only from subfossil bones, and became extinct shortly following human colonisation of the Chatham Islands. This genetically-distinct species was relatively large, with a thin, slim and low bill.

=== Evolution ===
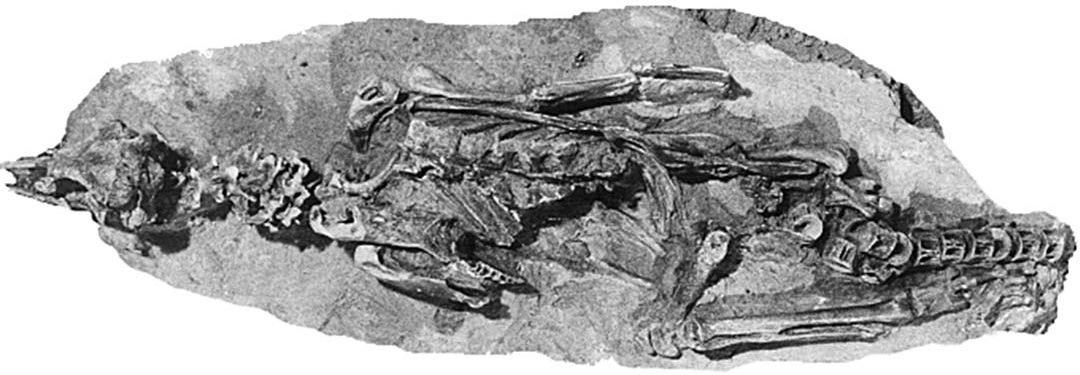
Madrynornis fossil

Mitochondrial and nuclear DNA evidence suggests that the crested penguins split from the ancestors of their closest living relative, the yellow-eyed penguin, in the mid-Miocene around 15 million years ago, before splitting into separate species around 8 million years ago in the late Miocene.

A fossil penguin genus, Madrynornis, has been identified as the closest known relative of the crested penguins. Found in late Miocene deposits dated to about 10 million years ago, it must have separated from the crested penguins around 12 million years ago. Given that the head ornamentation by yellow filoplumes seems plesiomorphic for the Eudyptes-Megadyptes lineage, Madrynornis probably had them too.

=== Extant Species ===
Genus Eudyptes – Vieillot, 1816 – Eight species
Common name	Scientific name and subspecies	Range	Size and ecology	IUCN status and estimated population
Fiordland penguin	Eudyptes pachyrhynchus G. R. Gray, 1845	New Zealand.	Size: Habitat: Diet:	NT
Snares penguin	Eudyptes robustus Oliver, 1953	New Zealand.	Size: Habitat: Diet:	VU
Erect-crested penguin	Eudyptes sclateri (Buller, 1888)	New Zealand, Bounty and Antipodes Islands.	Size: Habitat: Diet:	EN
Western rockhopper penguin	Eudyptes chrysocome (Forster, JR, 1781)	Kerguelen Islands and subantarctic islands of New Zealand, Cape Horn to the Falkland Islands	Size: Habitat: Diet:	VU
Eastern rockhopper penguin	Eudyptes filholi Hutton, FW, 1879	Prince Edward, Crozet, Kerguelen, Heard, Macquarie, Antipodes, Auckland and Campbell Islands	Size: Habitat: Diet:	
Northern rockhopper penguin	Eudyptes moseleyi Mathews & Iredale, 1921	southern Indian and Atlantic Oceans	Size: Habitat: Diet:	EN
Royal penguin	Eudyptes schlegeli Finsch, 1876	sub-Antarctic Macquarie Island and adjacent islands.	Size: Habitat: Diet:	LC
Macaroni penguin	Eudyptes chrysolophus (Brandt, 1837)	Subantarctic to the Antarctic Peninsula	Size: Habitat: Diet:	LC

== Description ==
The crested penguins are all similar in appearance, having sharply delineated black and white plumage with red beaks and prominent yellow crests. Their calls are more complex than those of other species, with several phrases of differing lengths. The royal penguin (mostly) has a white face, while other species have black faces.

== Breeding ==
Crested penguins breed on Subantarctic islands in the southern reaches of the world's oceans; the greatest diversity occurring around New Zealand and surrounding islands. Their breeding displays and behaviours are generally more complex than other penguin species. Both male and female parents take shifts incubating eggs and young.

Crested penguins lay two eggs, but almost always raise only one young successfully. All species exhibit the odd phenomenon of egg-size dimorphism in breeding; the first egg (or A-egg) laid is substantially smaller than the second egg (B-egg). This is most extreme in the macaroni penguin, where the first egg averages only 60% the size of the second. The reason for this remains unknown, although several theories have been proposed. British ornithologist David Lack theorized that the genus was evolving toward the laying of a one-egg clutch. Experiments with egg substitution have shown that A-eggs can produce viable chicks that were only 7% lighter at time of fledging. Physiologically, the first egg is smaller because it develops while the mother is still at sea swimming and thus has less energy to invest in the egg.

Recently, brooding royal and erect-crested penguins have been reported to tip the smaller eggs out as the second is laid.
