= Eudyptes calauina =

†Eudyptes calauina Temporal range: Pliocene

Scientific classification
- Kingdom: Animalia
- Phylum: Chordata
- Class: Aves
- Order: Sphenisciformes
- Family: Spheniscidae
- Genus: Eudyptes
- Species: †E. calauina

Binomial name
- †Eudyptes calauina Hoffmeister, Briceño, and Nielsen, 2014

Extinct species of crested penguin

Eudyptes calauina is an extinct species of crested penguin that lived during the Late Pliocene. It inhabited what is now central Chile.

== Etymology ==
The genus name Eudyptes derives from Ancient Greek, translating to "fine diver". The species name calauina derives from the Yaghan name for the rockhopper penguin (Eudyptes chrysocome).

== Description ==
Eudyptes calauina specimens stem from the Horcon Formation in the Valparaiso Region of central Chile. The extant crested penguin species do not inhabit central Chile.

Eudyptes calauina is larger than the extant crested penguins. It is also larger than Megadyptes antipodes, Spheniscus chilensis and Spheniscus humboldti. It is similar in size and proportions to Nucleornis insolitus, an extinct penguin species of the Early Pliocene in South Africa.
