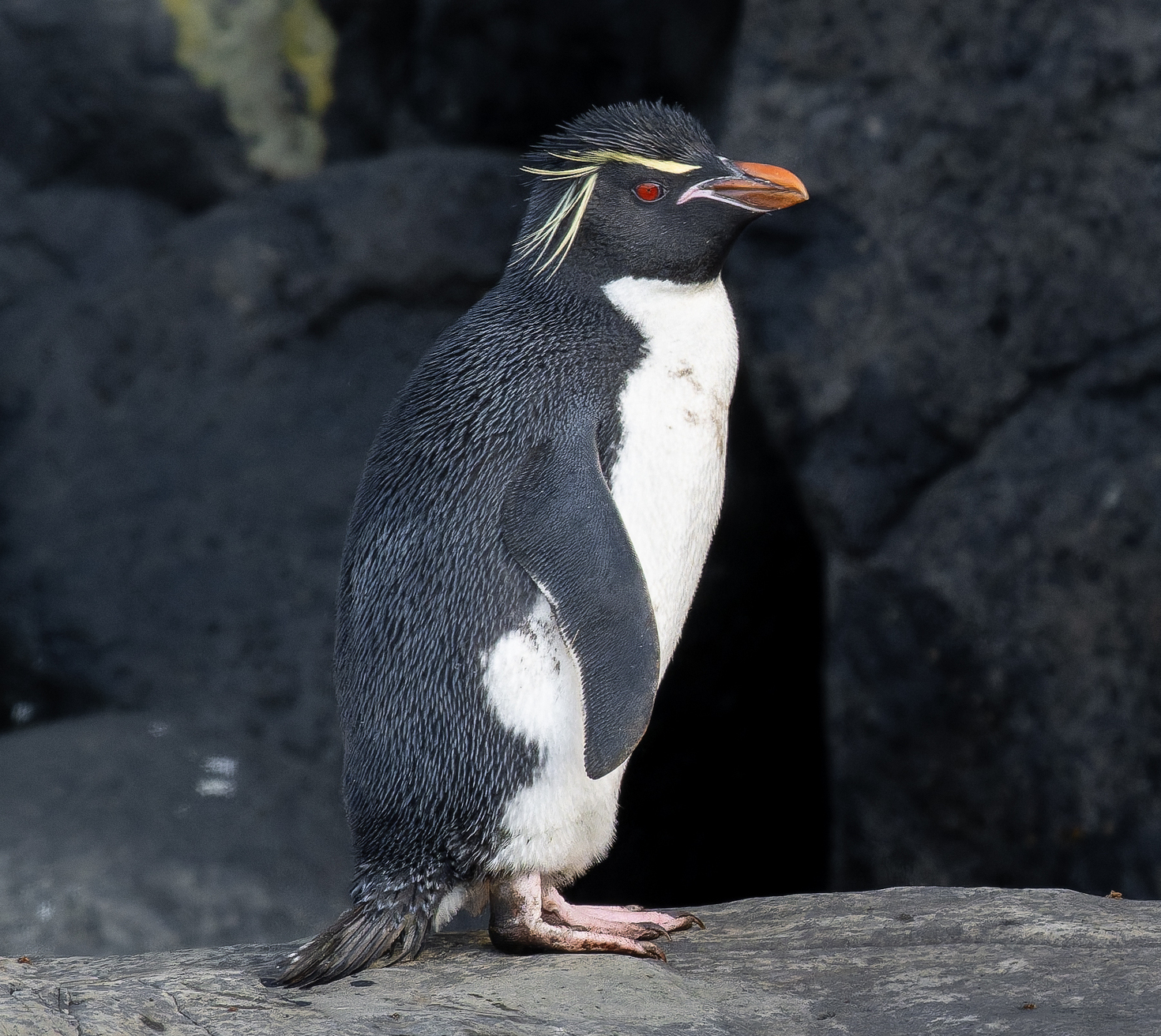
- At Auckland Island

Scientific classification
- Kingdom: Animalia
- Phylum: Chordata
- Class: Aves
- Order: Sphenisciformes
- Family: Spheniscidae
- Genus: Eudyptes
- Species: E. filholi

Binomial name
- Eudyptes filholi Hutton, 1879

= Eastern rockhopper penguin =

Eastern rockhopper penguin Temporal range: Pleistocene to recent

Species of bird

The eastern rockhopper penguin (Eudyptes filholi), also known as the tawaki kaipiki toka (Māori: 'rock climber'), is a crested penguin with yellow crest feathers. It was formerly treated as conspecific with the western rockhopper penguin with the name "southern rockhopper penguin" for the combined species. It is one of the smallest crested penguins and has distinctive pink margins around its bill. It breeds on islands in the Southern Indian and Pacific Oceans.

== Taxonomy ==
The eastern rockhopper penguin was formally described in 1879 by the English-born New Zealand scientist Frederick Wollaston Hutton based on a specimen that had been collected on Campbell Island which lies 660 km (410 mi) south of New Zealand's South Island. Hutton coined the current binomial name Eudyptes filholi where the specific epithet was chosen to honour the French medical doctor and palaeontologist, Henri Filhol. The species was formerly treated as conspecific with the western rockhopper penguin with the English name "southern rockhopper penguin" for the combined species. It is now considered a separate species based on a molecular phylogenetic study published in 2021. The two species differ in their distribution; the western species is found in Cape Horn, South America and the Falkland Islands while its eastern counterpart occupies the Southern Indian and Pacific Ocean. The eastern rockhopper penguin can also be distinguished by its pink margins around the bill.

== Description ==
The eastern rockhopper penguin is a small, crested penguin with a black back and throat, a white belly, and pink feet. This seabird measures approximately 45–55 cm in length, and weighs 2.2–4.3 kg. It has a thin yellow stripe that stretches from its lower forehead, over its red eye and splits into crest feathers at the back of its head. The crest feathers are composed of long, thin, spiky yellow feathers on either side of the penguin's head, and shorter black feathers join them. Rockhopper penguins have an orange-brown bill, and the eastern rockhopper penguin has distinctive pink margins around the bill. Males and females differ in body size and size of their bill; males are generally larger and have a thicker bill.

Fledglings, which are around 65 days old, are bluish black all over and lack crest feathers. They also have a smaller, thinner bill than juveniles and adults. Juveniles, which are penguins aged 1 to 2 years, are black-brown with a grey throat. They develop a brown-orange bill that is darker than the adult colour, and have small yellow crest feathers. Eastern rockhopper penguins molt and get their adult plumage at 2 years old.

== Distribution and habitat ==
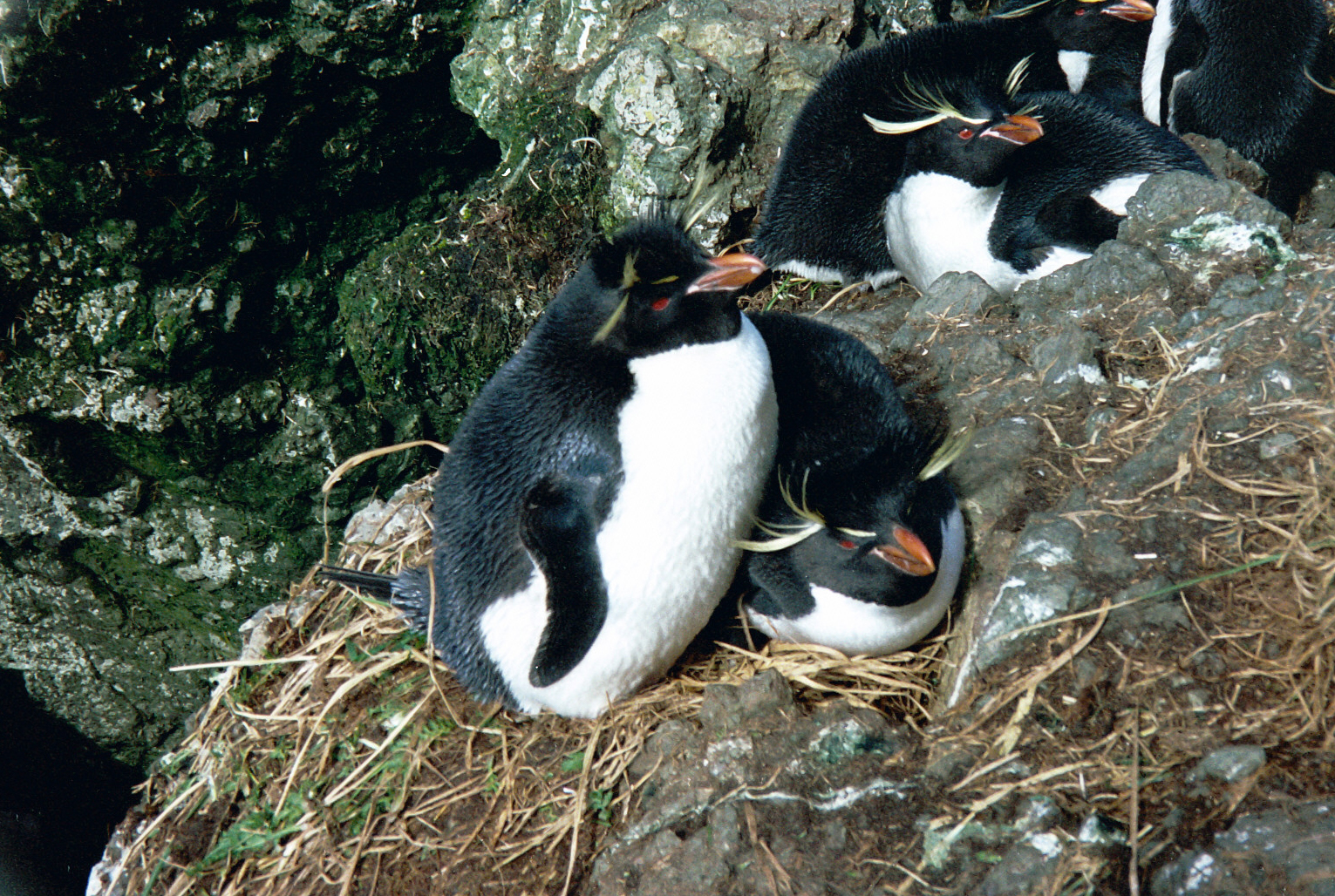
At Macquarie Island

The eastern rockhopper penguin is found in the southern Indian and Pacific oceans from Prince Edward Islands to the Antipodes Islands. Rockhopper penguins, in general, occupied a circumpolar distribution in the Arctic during the breeding season. Eastern rockhopper penguins breed in the Marion Islands, Macquarie island and subantarctic islands in New Zealand such as the Antipodes islands and Campbell island. These penguins occupy a mainly marine pelagic habitat and only return to land to breed and moult. They spend the winter months, approximately April to October, in the southern Indian Ocean foraging for food and can spend up to 6 months at sea. They travel, on average, 2000 to 4000 km away from their breeding site during this winter period. This species mainly forages in cool waters; ocean temperatures of less than 4.5 degrees Celsius.

Eastern rockhopper penguins are surface nesters and will build their nest on slopes or rocky shores near the coastline. Colonies will usually form on cliffs near the sea and can contain tens of thousands of nests. Their nests are made of small pebbles and can occasionally contain some vegetation. Some colonies have settled within grasslands, such as tussocks; however, the soil often erodes down to rock over a few decades due to the accumulation of guano and trampling. Eastern rockhopper penguins are rarely found more than 200 metres away from the coastline, since it is ideal to remain near their food supply.

== Behaviour ==
=== Vocalisation ===
Eastern rockhopper penguins use calls for parent-chick recognition when returning to the colony with food. They also use a song for courtship that can be described as a short repeated rhythmic ascending song. The song of an adult rockhopper penguin can have 5-30 syllables, with the first syllable the longest. Their contact call used by chicks and adults is a very short, shrill bark.

=== Diet and foraging ===
Eastern rockhopper penguins feed on a variety of fish, crustaceans, and cephalopods such as krill and squid. Their diet can differ depending on where they are in their life cycle. During their pre-moult season, eastern rockhopper penguins mainly consume crustaceans, while during the breeding period their diet heavily relies on euphausiids in the Marion islands. Different breeding location will also impact their diet; chicks in the Campbell Islands were found to consume dwarf cod mainly. Rockhopper penguins highly depend on a predictable food source near their nesting habitat to feed their chicks. However, if necessary rockhopper penguins can forage up to 120 km away from their breeding grounds to find food for their chicks.

They are diurnal divers; the majority of their foraging activity occurs during the day, with the deepest dives occurring at sunrise. When searching for food, they usually stay at a depth of 6m and dive down 30-50m in the water column to catch their prey. They tend to forage in cool waters since they are most productive. They also selected foraging areas with a large generation of eddy currents. This current supports high aggregations of prey species.

The predators of the rockhopper penguin include fur seals and sea lions. As well, brown skuas (Stercorarius antarcticus) and northern giant petrel (Macronectes halli) prey on rockhopper penguin eggs and chicks.

=== Breeding ===
Breeding season starts in October for eastern rockhopper penguins; males return to the breeding colony first, and the females follow shortly after. Courtship begins between pairs and both sexes fast until the female lays the first eggs, usually around the beginning of November. After the eggs are laid, the male and female will share all the parental duties. The first incubation period is shared, and both parents will fast during this time, approximately 7 days. After this, the female takes the first solo incubation shift while the male goes to forage at sea, this can last up to 3 weeks. Once the male returns, he takes over incubation while the female forages for approximately 10 days, by the time she returns, the chicks have hatched. After the chicks hatch, the male will guard the chicks and continue to fast while the female forages and returns with food for the chicks. The chicks form creches when they are around 24 days old, and during this time, both parents forage and return with food. A creche is a common occurrence in bird species when the juveniles form protective groups to allow the parents to forage. Parent penguins continue to feed chicks until they fledge around February when they are approximately 65 days old. Adult penguins will return to the breeding colony in April to moult before their winter at sea.

== Threats and Conservation ==
The eastern rockhopper penguin is considered a vulnerable species due to rapid population declines. This decrease in population is mostly seen in breeding regions since it is the easiest form of census. Most research agrees that the decline in rockhopper penguins is due to low food availability and a decrease in food quality driven by climate change. Due to climate change, sea surface and ocean temperatures are changing, and this affects the distribution of prey populations. Rockhopper penguins, and many other species, are sensitive to changes in water temperature and, as a consequence, adult penguins must forage farther away from breeding colonies. They often return with smaller amounts of food for their chicks, which leads to a decrease in body mass. Low food availability also has a large effect on penguins' moult period. Moulting is a very energy-demanding process and requires penguins to have sufficient body mass. Due to a poor diet, mortality increases during the moulting season. Low food quality and abundance in wintering regions have also led to increased adult mortality. Climate change has additionally affected the amount and intensity of storms in breeding ranges. Wind intensity displaces prey populations and reduces penguin foraging success.
