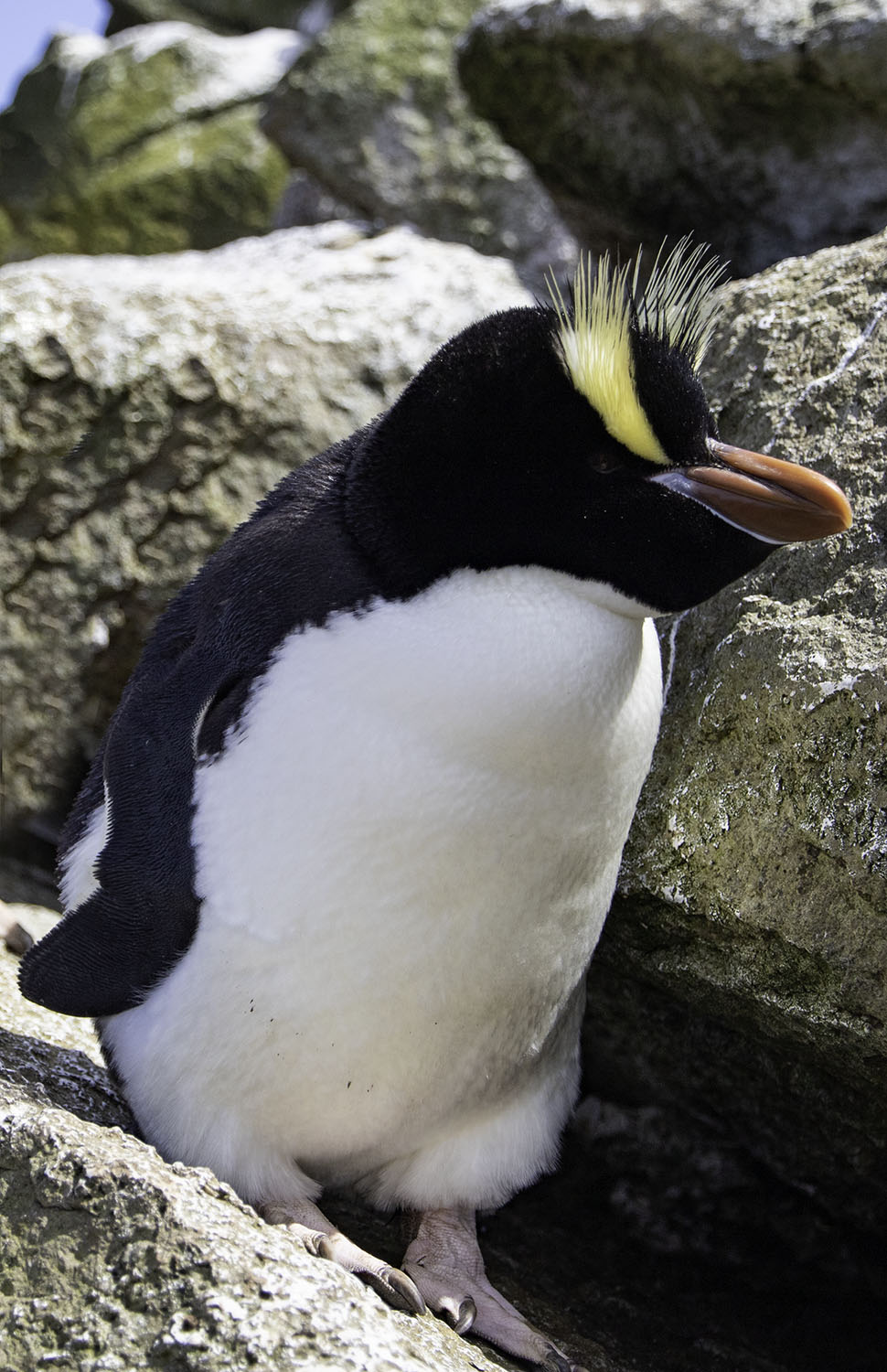
- On the Proclamation Island, Bounty Islands

Conservation status
- Endangered (IUCN 3.1)

Scientific classification
- Kingdom: Animalia
- Phylum: Chordata
- Class: Aves
- Order: Sphenisciformes
- Family: Spheniscidae
- Genus: Eudyptes
- Species: E. sclateri

Binomial name
- Eudyptes sclateri Buller, 1888
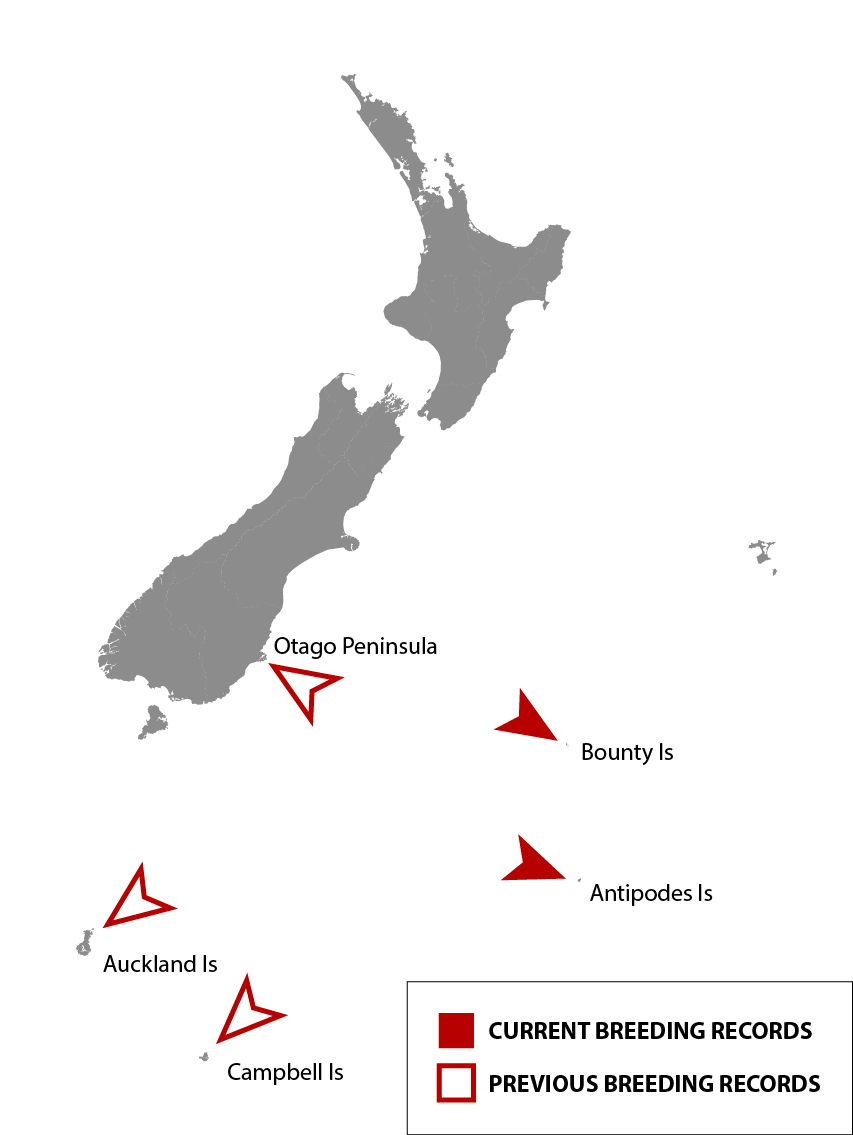
- Distribution (nesting) of the erect-crested penguin

= Erect-crested penguin =

Species of bird

The erect-crested penguin (Eudyptes sclateri; Māori: Tawaki nana hī) is a penguin endemic to the New Zealand region and only breeds on the Bounty and Antipodes Islands. It has black upper parts, white underparts and a yellow eye stripe and crest. It spends the winter at sea and little is known about its biology and breeding habits. Populations are believed to have declined during the last few decades of the twentieth century, and the International Union for Conservation of Nature has listed it as being "endangered".

== Description ==
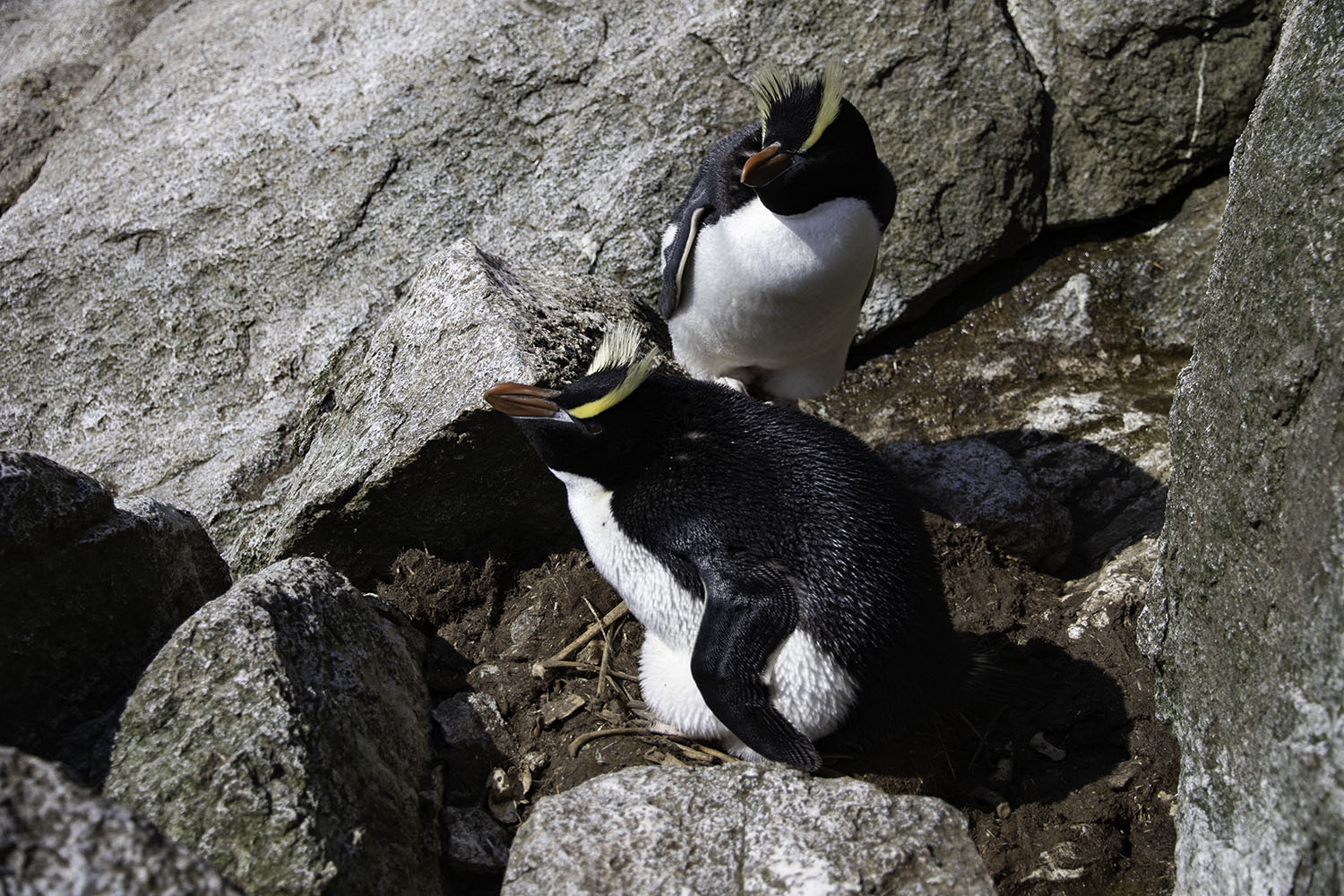
Breeding pair of erect-crested penguins at their nest

This is a small-to-medium-sized, yellow-crested, black-and-white penguin, at 50–70 cm (20–28 in) and weighing 2.5–6 kg (5.5–13.2 lb). The male is slightly larger than the female and as in most crested penguins has a larger bill. It has bluish-black to jet black upper parts and white underparts, and a broad, bright yellow eyebrow-stripe which extends over the eye to form a short, erect crest. With a mean body mass in males of 6.38 kg (14.1 lb) (sample size 22) and females of 5.4 kg (12 lb) (sample size 22), the erect-crested penguin is the largest of the crested penguin species and as the fourth heaviest extant penguin, being nearly as heavy on average as the gentoo penguin.

Its biology is poorly studied and only little information about the species has emerged in the past decades. The only recent study conducted on the Antipodes Islands focused on aspects of the mate choice. Research on the species is hampered by logistics and restrictive permitting by the New Zealand Department of Conservation.

It presumably feeds on small fish, krill and squid like other crested penguin species.

The binomial commemorates the British zoologist Philip Lutley Sclater.

== Distribution ==
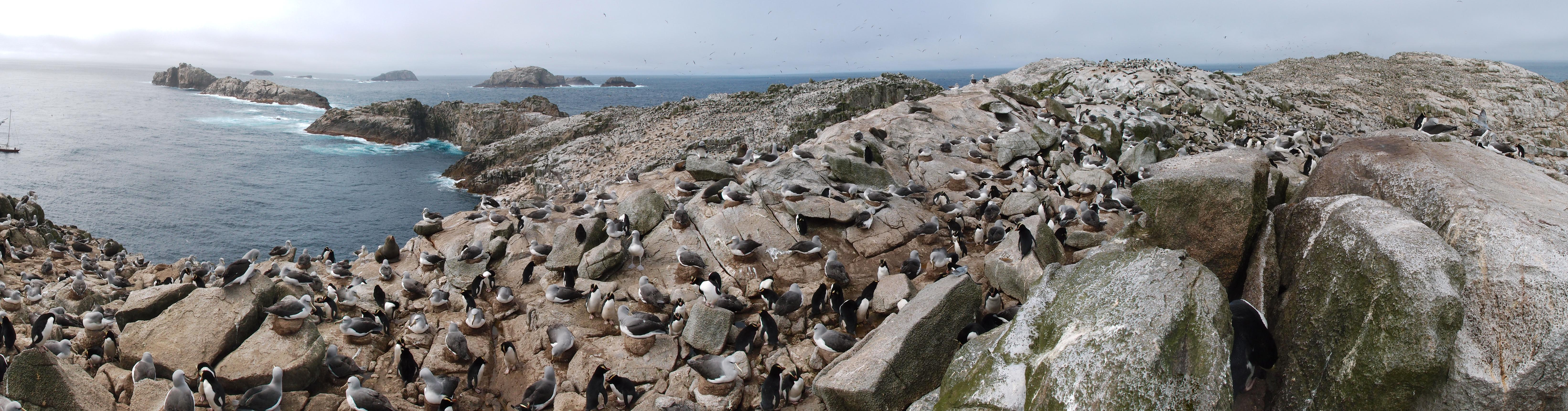
Mixed colony of erect-crested penguins and Salvin's albatross, Bounty Islands, New Zealand

Erect-crested penguins breed on the Bounty and Antipodes Islands. Previous records of small breeding populations have also been reported from Campbell Island and the Auckland Islands; in the 1940s a breeding pair was documented on the Otago Peninsula on the New Zealand mainland. The species spends extended times at sea during the pre-moult period (February–March) as well as over the winter months (March–August). Individuals have been found as far away as the Falkland Islands and it is also a vagrant to Argentina, Antarctica and Australia.

Erect-crested penguins nest in large colonies on rocky terrain. On the Antipodes Islands, the penguins breed in mono-specific colonies or sometimes sympatrically with Southern rockhopper penguins. On the Bounty Islands, erect-crested penguins breed in large mixed colonies with Salvin's albatross. Erect-crested penguins breed in two-egg clutches from the months between September and late January. The first egg to be laid is typically 25–70% smaller than the second egg. The extreme difference in egg sizes has demonstrated asynchronous incubation habits, with the larger egg being granted more accommodation and priority than the smaller egg.

== Status ==
Populations of this species are believed to have declined drastically since the 1940s. Population estimates from the late 1970s put the total numbers of erect-crested penguins breeding on the Bounty and Antipodes Islands at 230,000 breeding pairs although the accuracy of these figures have recently been questioned. Nevertheless, there is ample evidence for substantial population declines in the second half of the 20th century although these declines seem to have slowed in recent decades. The current population is estimated at 150,000 mature individuals and is being listed as an endangered species on the IUCN Red List; the erect-crested penguin is listed as endangered and granted protection under the U.S. Endangered Species Act.
