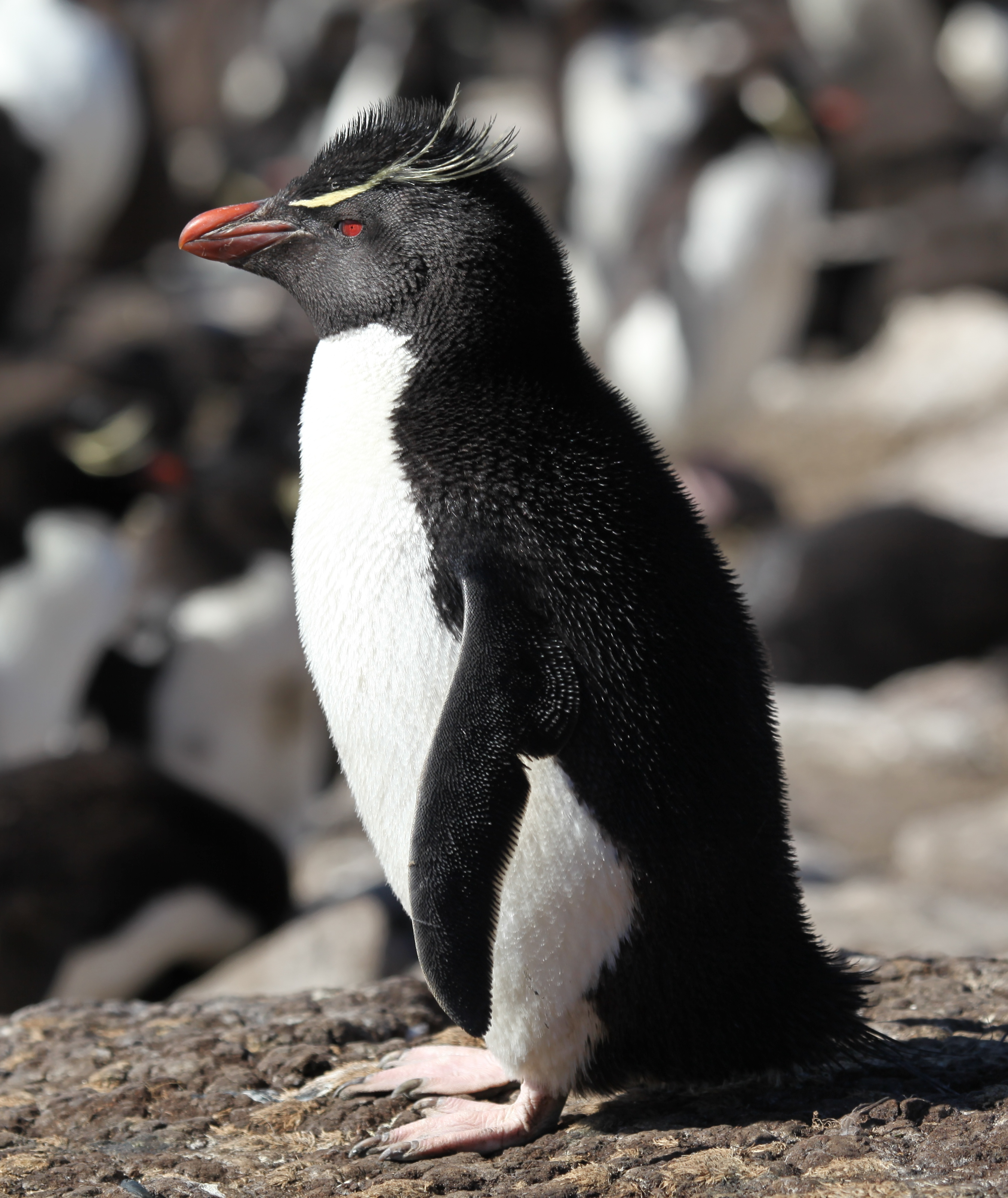
- At Saunders Island (Falkland Islands)

Conservation status
- Vulnerable (IUCN 3.1)

Scientific classification
- Kingdom: Animalia
- Phylum: Chordata
- Class: Aves
- Order: Sphenisciformes
- Family: Spheniscidae
- Genus: Eudyptes
- Species: E. chrysocome

Binomial name
- Eudyptes chrysocome (J. R. Forster, 1781)
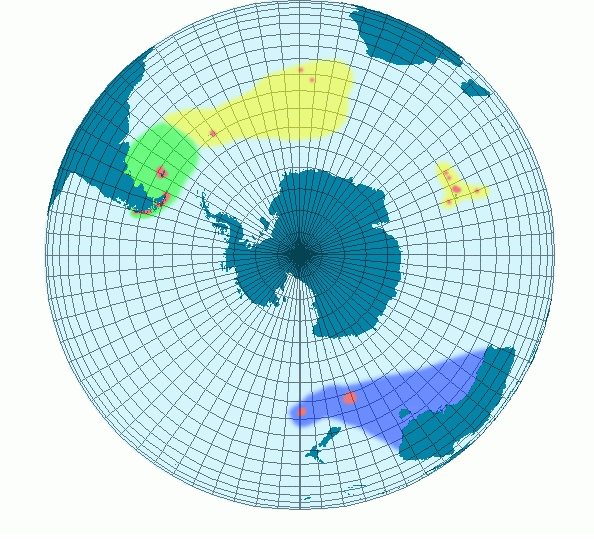
- Distribution map of rockhopper penguins Green: western rockhopper penguin; blue: eastern rockhopper penguin; yellow: northern rockhopper penguin

Synonyms
- Aptenodytes chrysocome J. R. Forster, 1781; Aptenodytes crestata J. F. Miller, 1784; Eudyptes crestatus (J. F. Miller, 1784)

= Western rockhopper penguin =

Western rockhopper penguin Temporal range: Pleistocene to recent

Species of bird

The western rockhopper penguin (Eudyptes chrysocome) is a species of rockhopper penguin. It occurs in subantarctic waters around the southern coast of South America and nearby islands.

The western rockhopper penguin was formerly considered to be conspecific with the eastern rockhopper penguin (Eudyptes filholi) of the western Pacific and Indian Oceans, with the combined species then known as southern rockhopper penguin. These two taxa together had previously also been considered conspecific with the northern rockhopper penguin (E. moseleyi).

== Taxonomy ==
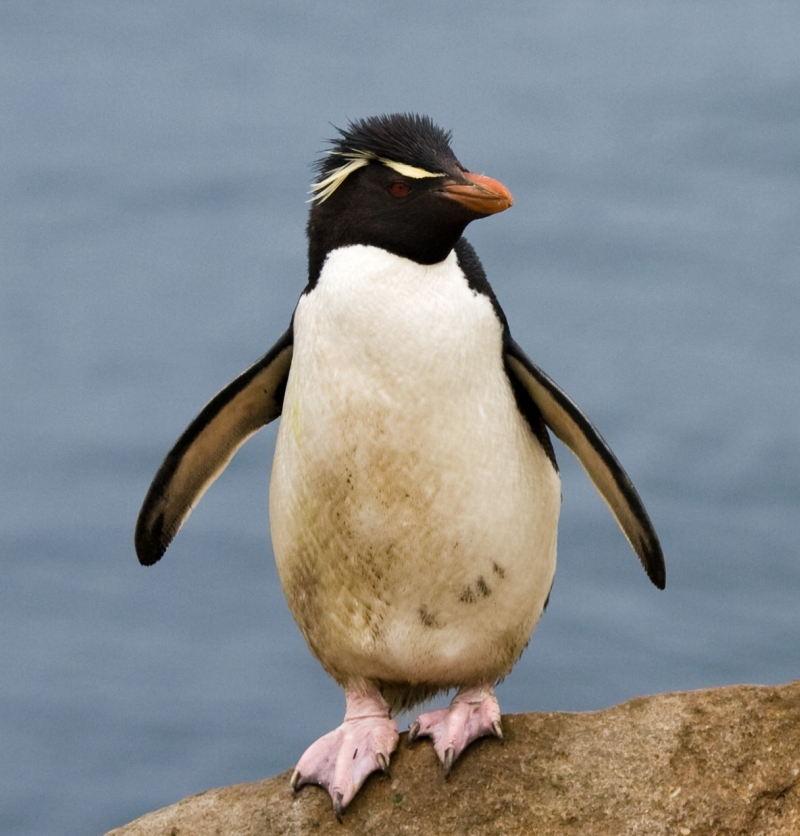
Adult in the New Island (Falkland Islands) rookery

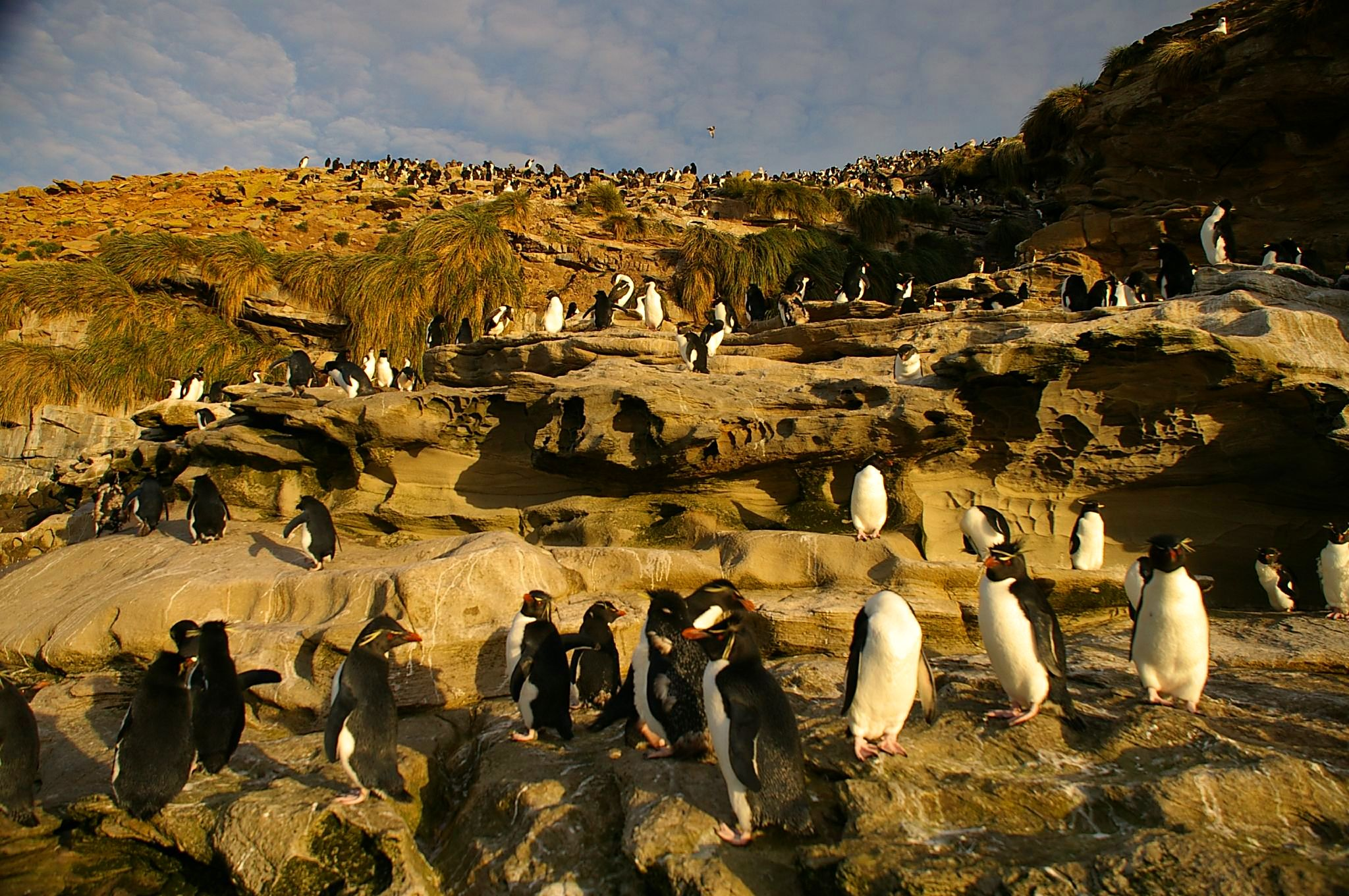
Eudyptes chrysocome colony on Saunders Island, Falkland Islands

In 1743 the English naturalist George Edwards included an illustration and a description of the western rockhopper penguin in the first volume of his A Natural History of Uncommon Birds. Edwards based his hand-coloured etching on a preserved specimen owned by Peter Collinson. When in 1758 the Swedish naturalist Carl Linnaeus updated his Systema Naturae for the tenth edition, he placed the western rockhopper penguin with the red-billed tropicbird in the genus Phaethon. Linnaeus included a brief description, coined the binomial name Phaethon demersus and cited Edwards' work. The use of Linnaeus' binomial name was not adopted by later ornithologists, because he had already used the specific demersa for the African penguin which he placed with the wandering albatross in the genus Diomedea.

The western rockhopper penguin was formally described in 1781 by the German naturalist Johann Reinhold Forster under the binomial name Aptenodytes chrysocome. The species is now placed in the genus Eudyptes that was introduced by the French ornithologist Louis Pierre Vieillot in 1816. The genus name combines the Ancient Greek eu meaning "fine" with dyptes meaning "diver". The specific epithet chrysocome is from the Ancient Greek khrusokomos meaning "golden-haired" (from khrusos meaning "gold" and komē meaning "hair").

The species is monotypic; no subspecies are recognised. It was formerly treated as conspecific with the eastern rockhopper penguin with the English name "southern rockhopper penguin" for the combined species. It is now considered as separate based on a molecular phylogenetic study published in 2021. The two species differ in their distribution; the western species is found in Cape Horn, South America and the Falkland Islands while its eastern counterpart occupies the Southern Indian and Pacific Ocean. The eastern rockhopper penguin can also be distinguished by its pink margins around the bill. The northern rockhopper penguin lives in a different water mass from the western and eastern rockhopper penguins, separated by the Subtropical Front, and differs genetically from them. Therefore, northern birds are also now separated, as E. moseleyi. The rockhopper penguins are closely related to the macaroni penguin (E. chrysolophus) and the royal penguin (E. schlegeli).

Interbreeding with the macaroni penguin has been reported at Heard and Marion Islands, with three hybrids recorded there by a 1987–88 Australian National Antarctic Research Expedition.

== Description ==
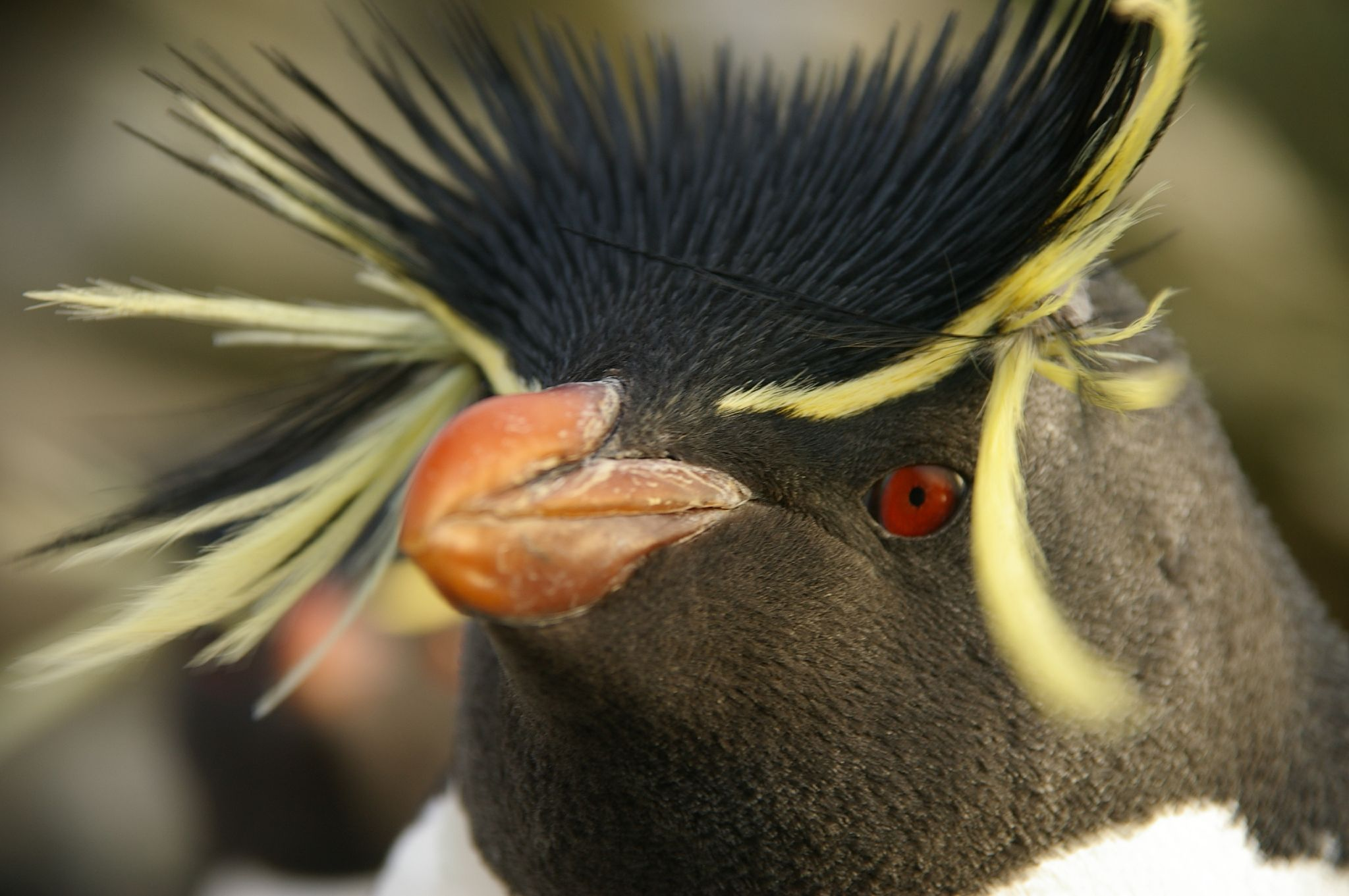
Western rockhopper penguin (Eudyptes chrysocome) displaying its distinctive crest

This is the smallest of the yellow-crested, black-and-white penguins in the genus Eudyptes. It reaches a length of 45–58 cm (18–23 in) and typically weighs 2–3.4 kg (4.4–7.5 lb), although there are records of exceptionally large rockhoppers weighing 4.5 kg (9.9 lb). It has slate-grey upper parts and has straight, bright yellow eyebrows ending in long yellowish plumes projecting sideways behind a red eye.

== Ecology ==
The western rockhopper penguin group has a global population of roughly 1 million pairs. It breeds on the Falkland Islands and on islands off Patagonia. Outside the breeding season, western rockhopper penguins can be found roaming the waters offshore from their colonies.

These penguins feed on krill, squid, octopus, lantern fish, mollusks, plankton, cuttlefish, and mainly crustaceans.

A rockhopper penguin named 'Rocky' in Bergen Aquarium in Norway lived to 29 years 4 months. It died in October 2003. This stands as the age record for rockhopper penguins, and possibly it was the oldest penguin known.

== Behaviour ==
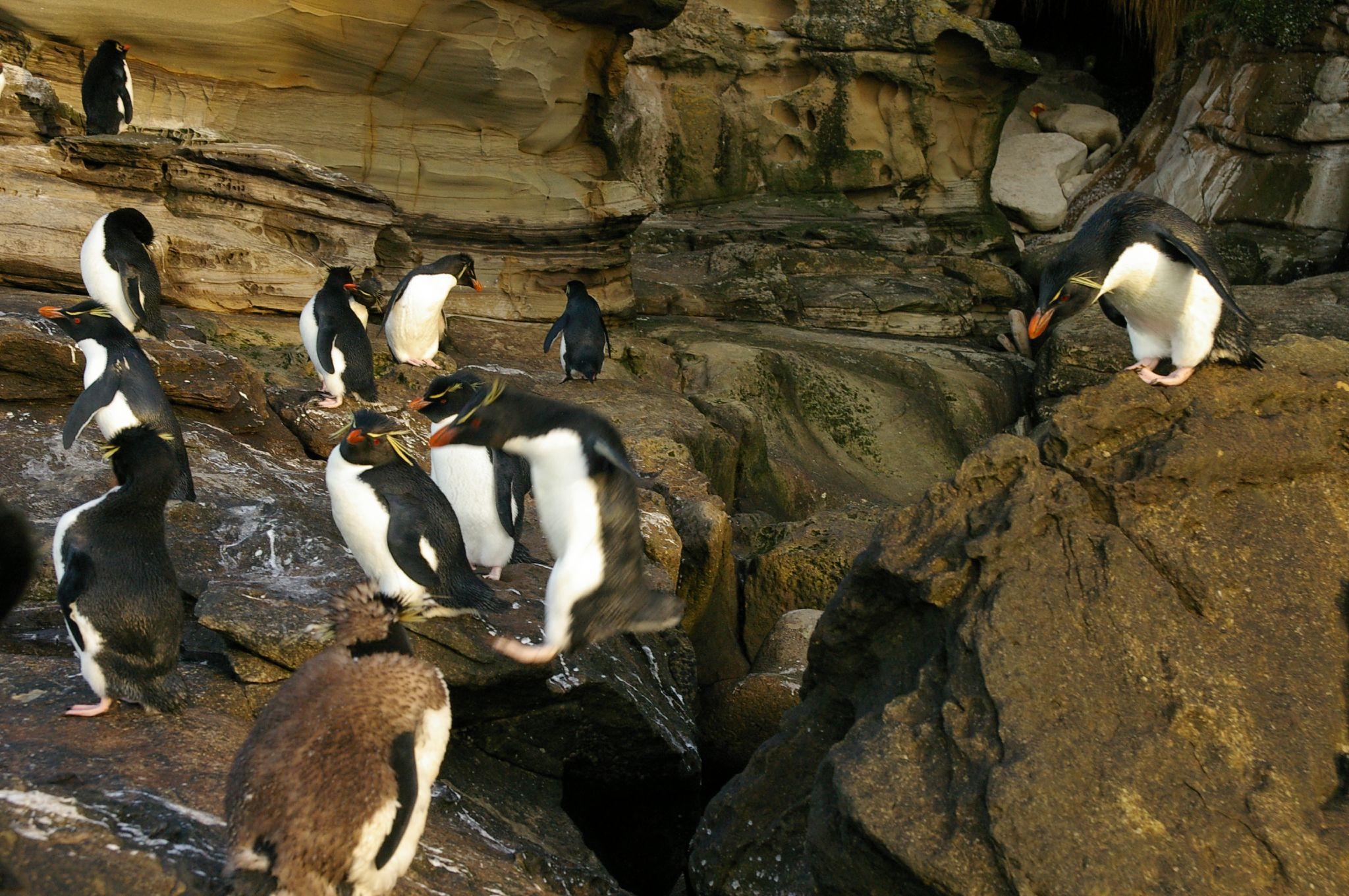
E. chrysocome on Saunders Island, Falkland Islands hopping over a crack

Their common name refers to the fact that, unlike many other penguins, which get around obstacles by sliding on their bellies or by awkward climbing using their flipper-like wings as aid, rockhoppers will try to jump over boulders and across cracks. This behaviour is by no means unique to this species however; the other "crested" penguins in the genus Eudyptes also hop around rocks. But the rockhopper's congeners occur on remote islands in the New Zealand region, whereas the rockhopper penguins are found in places that were visited by explorers and whalers since the Early Modern era. Hence, it is this particular species in which this behaviour was first noted.

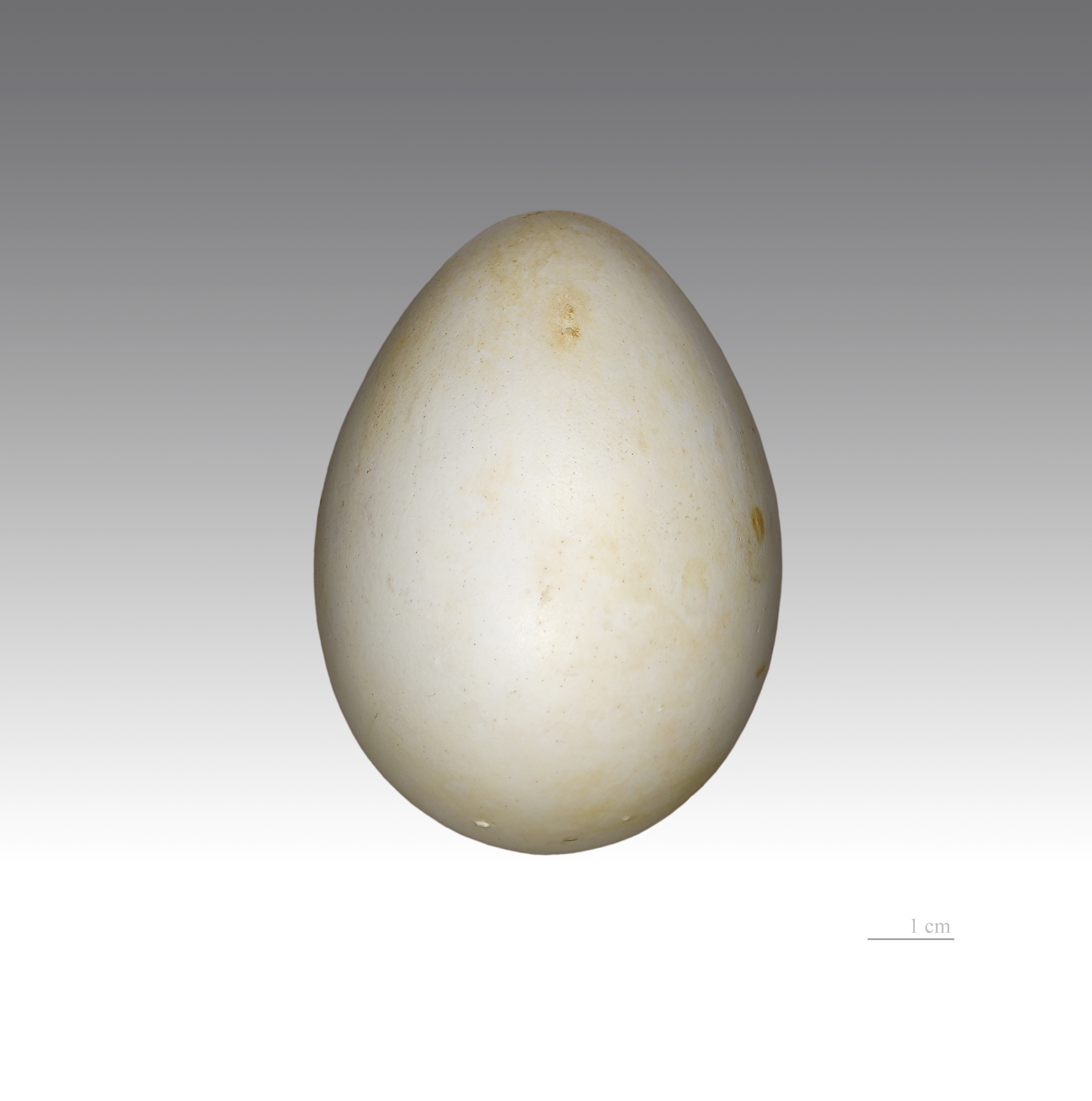
Egg

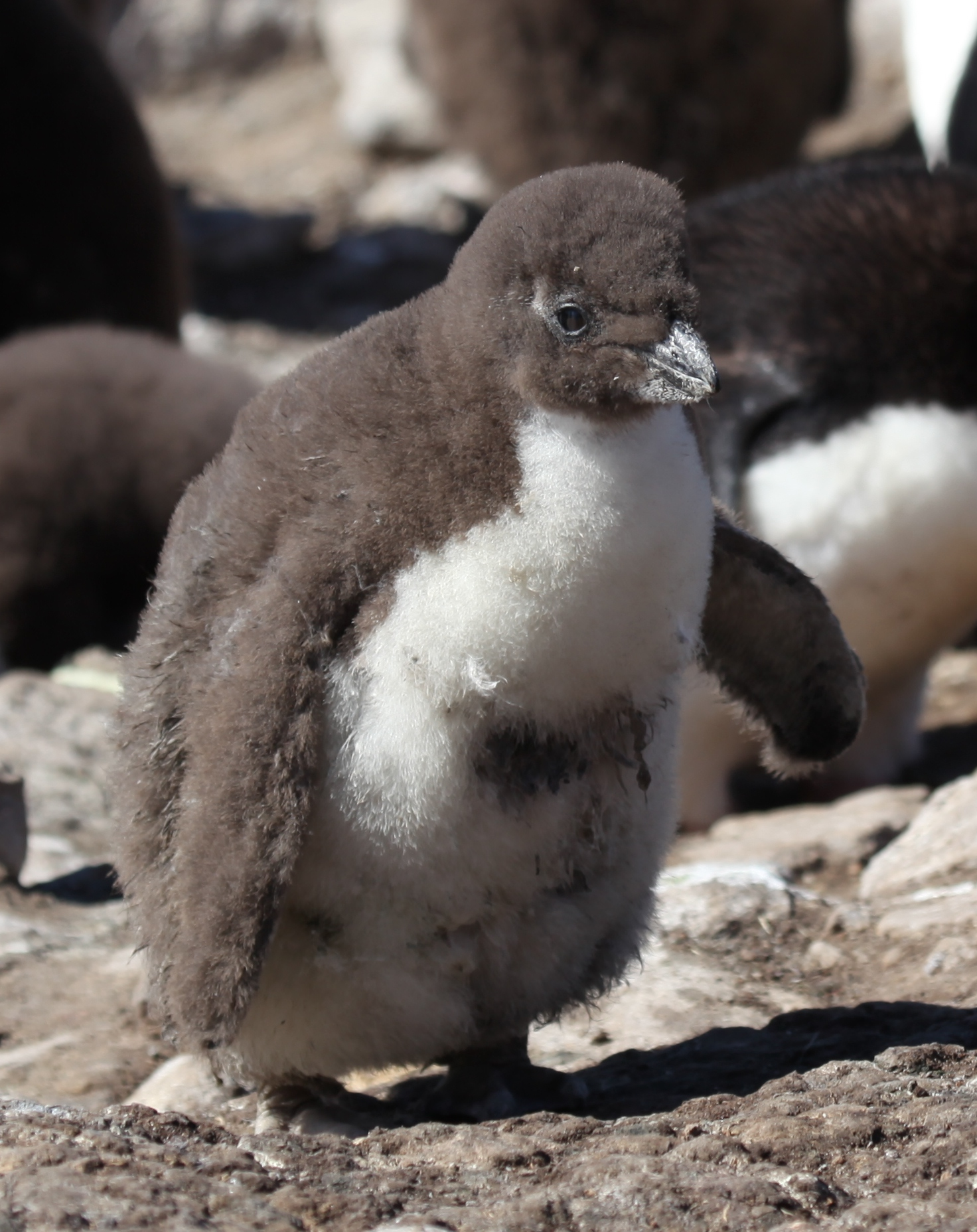
A chick on Saunders Island in the Falkland Islands

Their breeding colonies are located from sea level to cliff-tops and sometimes inland. Their breeding season starts in September and ends in November. Two eggs are laid but only one is usually incubated. Incubation lasts 35 days and their chicks are brooded for 26 days.

=== Variation in foraging behaviour ===
Rockhopper penguins are known to have complex foraging behaviour. Influenced by factors such as sea ice abundance, prey availability, breeding stage, and seasonality, rockhopper penguins must be able to adapt their behaviour to fit the current conditions. Rockhopper penguins employ different strategies according to their conditions. When making foraging trips, rockhoppers typically leave and return to their colonies in groups. One study showed they are known for going up to 157 km (98 mi) away from their colonies when foraging. Females typically forage during the day in 11–12 hour trips consisting of many dives, but they will occasionally forage at night. Night dives are typically much shallower than day dives. Dives typically last around 12h, but can be up to 15hrs, with penguins leaving the colony around dawn (04:00) and returning at dusk (19:00).

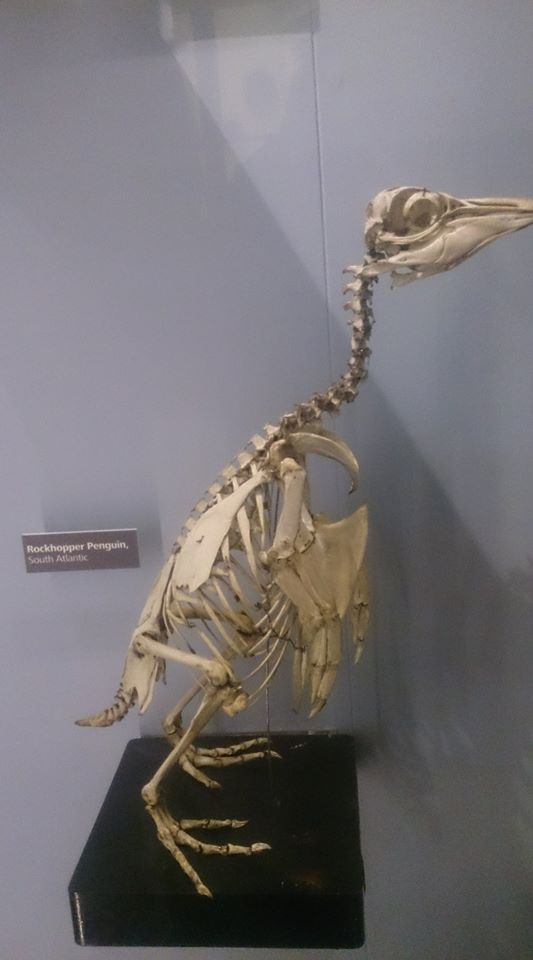
Rockhopper penguin skeleton in Manchester Museum

Rockhopper penguins employ different strategies and foraging behaviour depending on the climate and environment. A main factor is food location. Subantarctic penguins must dive for longer periods of time and much deeper in search of food than do species in warmer waters where food is more easily accessible.

==== Benthic and pelagic dives ====
Rockhopper penguins are known to employ two different types of dives when foraging, pelagic and benthic dives. Pelagic dives are typically short and relatively shallow and used very frequently. Benthic dives are much deeper dives near the seafloor (up to 100 m (330 ft) deep) that typically last longer and have longer bottom time. Penguins performing benthic dives typically only perform a few depth wiggles (changes in depth profile) at their maximum depth. at an average speed of range of 6.9–8.1 kilometres per hour (6,900–8,100 m/h). Although deeper dives tend to be a bit longer than shallow dives, foraging rockhoppers will minimise their travel time when performing benthic dives to gain maximum efficiency. Benthic dives in particular show a stronger correlation to full stomachs than pelagic dives. Emperor penguins, gentoo penguins, yellow-eyed penguins and king penguins also use this deep-dive technique to obtain food.

Prey availability is dependent on many factors, such as current climate and conditions of the area. Typically, females will bring back a majority of crustaceans and occasionally some fish for their young. The female's foraging success directly affects chick growth. If food is scarce, females are able to fast for very long periods of time and sometimes will only forage for the chick's benefit.

==== Dive limitations ====
Because foraging conditions and outcomes are so variable, several factors can limit foraging practices. The timing of breeding, incubation and brooding periods greatly affect foraging time, as females are unable to leave broods for long periods of time. Females during the brooding period will follow a much more fixed foraging schedule, leaving and returning to the colony at roughly the same time each day. When not in breeding season, females have much more variability in the length of foraging trips. If females have low energy levels because they are fasting while provisioning chicks, they may make several short foraging trips instead of one longer one.

While benthic dives are efficient and favorable for rockhoppers, they present physiological limitations such as limits in lung capacity, which affects duration of dives. The longest aerobic dive rockhoppers can perform is about 110 seconds long, but dives can last upwards of 180–190 seconds.

== Status and conservation ==
The western rockhopper penguin group is classified as vulnerable by the IUCN. Its population has declined by about one-third in the last thirty years. This decline has earned them the classification of a vulnerable species by the IUCN. Threats to their population include commercial fishing and oil spills.

With the approval of the European Association of Zoos and Aquaria (EAZA), Drusillas Park in East Sussex holds the studbook for rockhopper penguins in Europe. Zoo manager Sue Woodgate has specialist knowledge of the species, so the zoo is responsible for co-ordinating the movements of penguins among zoos in Europe to take part in breeding programmes and offer their advice and information about the species.

== Relationship with humans ==
The indigenous Yahgan people whose territory in Tierra del Fuego overlaps with its distribution often hunted them by slingshot or dart as a source of food.

Rockhopper penguins are the most familiar of the crested penguins to the general public in the present day. Their breeding colonies, namely those around South America, today attract many tourists who enjoy watching the birds' antics. Historically, the same islands had been popular stopover and replenishing sites for whalers and other seafarers since at least the early 18th century. Almost all crested penguins depicted in movies, books and other media are ultimately based on Eudyptes chrysocome.
