= Aizenogyps =

Aizenogyps Temporal range: Blancan 2 Ma

Scientific classification
- Kingdom: Animalia
- Phylum: Chordata
- Class: Aves
- Order: Cathartiformes
- Family: Cathartidae
- Genus: †Aizenogyps; Emslie, 1998
- Species: †A. toomeyae

Binomial name
- †Aizenogyps toomeyae Emslie, 1998

Extinct genus of birds

Aizenogyps is an extinct genus of new world vulture from the Blancan fossil site of Haile 7C in Florida. Described based on a leg bone and a few additional fossils, the genus is noted for having had a more robust and collumnar tarsometatarsus than what is seen in modern cathartiid vultures. In terms of size its been described as being among the larger members of its family, comparable in size to the modern Andean condor, one of the largest living flighted birds, and slightly smaller than the extinct genus Dryornis. It's fossils are currently only known from the site of Haile 7C, which during the early Pleistocene represented an ancient lake within a forest or open woodlands.

== History and naming ==
The fossils of Aizenogyps have been recovered from Blancan deposits at Haile 7C, a fossil locality in Alachua County, Florida. The genus was established by Steven D. Emslie in 1998 based on a complete left tarsometatarsus, though a number of other remains not found in association with the type specimen, namely fifteen neck vertebrae, the third vertebra of the torso and a left upper arm bone were referred to the taxon as paratypes.

The name Aizenogygps derives from the Greek words "aizeno", which translates to "powerful" or "vigorous", and "gyps", meaning vulture. The species name honors Barbara Toomey, who was responsible for the discovery of some of the material used in naming the genus and contributed to Floridian paleontology beyond that.

== Description ==
The shaft of the tarsometatarsus of Aizenogyps is described by Emslie as having been broader and more robust those of all fossil and living cathartids known at the time including the modern Californian and Andean condors. The shaft is columnar (straight) as in Hadrogyps and lacks the distinct flaring present towards both ends seen in the extant genera as well as Brasilogyps and Pliogyps. The anterior metatarsal groove is deeper towards the bone's articulation with the tibiotarsus and stretches across over half the length of the shaft like in modern king vultures. The distal and proximal foramina are small rather than large as in Hadrogyps or even moderately-large like in Pliogyps. The intercotylar prominence, located at the bone's proximal end, features a deep notch in its surface that is either only shallow or entirely absent across modern cathartids. Similarly the intercotylar depression, which is shallow and small across extant genera, is described as large, round and deeply excavated. Observing the tarsometatarsus from behind shows that the hypotarsus is nearly as deep as it is wide, forming a broad plate similar to what is seen in the genus Coragyps, today's black vulture. It also somewhat resembles the genus Cathartes, which includes the turkey vulture, in lacking a notch in the proximal edge of the hypotarsus. Internal to the ridge that extends downward from the hypotarsus the tarsometatarsal shaft is deeply excavated, unlike in modern cathartids where this excavation is only described as shallow to moderately deep. The ridges bordering the internal and external borders of the posterior tarsometatarsus are also well developed, with Emslie describing them as high and distinct as opposed to the shallow ridges observed in extant forms. At the other end of the tarsometatarsus the metatarsal facets are positioned in a way that places them closer to the internal side of the shaft like in turkey vultures and Andean condors, whereas in Californian condors, king and turkey vultures they extend much further proximally. In addition to that, the shaft is notably depressed above the trochleae, whereas in extant genera and Geronogyps such a depression is absent or at most shallow. The surface of the trochlea metatarsi II, to which the second (innermost) toe attaches, is described as moderate to large in size. The middle trochlea, which corresponds to the third (middle) toe, is relatively short like in Californian condors, though it is still noticeably longer than the trochlea to either side. The fourth trochlea, corresponding to the outermost toe, is large but its dorsal surface is not well deliminated towards the proximal end of the tibiotarsus. The fourth trochlea further differs from the Mongolian cathartid Gobicathartes in the fact that like in Kuntur, Geronogyps and Hadrogyps the medial semi-block protrudes further distally than the lateral semi-block.

The deltoid crest of the humerus is broad and flared and extends relatively far distally before merging into the shaft of the bone, a trait shared with smaller cathartids like Cathartes and Coragyps as well as the larger Geronogyps. This contrasts with the two extant condor species and the king vulture, in which the crest is shallower and disappears into the shaft further up. The internal border of the crest is large and raised clearly above the shaft, whereas in modern forms and Geronogyps it either remains flush with the shaft or is, at most, slightly raised. The crest ultimately ends in an oblong tubercle that is larger than in modern new world vultures. The pneumatic foramen of the upper arm are shallow with broad, rounded borders, a feature shared by Cathartes, while other modern cathartids have deeper foramina or in the case of Gymnogyps narrower borders. The groove that separates the humeral head from the internal tuberosity is deep where it is shallow in Gymnogyps, only moderately deep in Vultur and Sarcorhamphus and at least partially to fully pneumatized in both Cathartes and Coragyps. The impression left by the brachialis anticus muscle are not pneumatized, which sets Aizenogyps apart from black vultures, and compared to turkey vultures the impression left is not as elongated. The point of attachment for the anterior articular ligament is described as broader than what is seen in the Californian condor and turkey vultures, instead being more comparable to the anatomy seen in the Andean condor.

Emslie describes Aizenogyps as having reached a size comparable to that of Dryornis, though the latter is slightly larger, while Degrange and colleagues regard it as comparable to the Andean condor and the extinct Vultur messii.

== Paleobiology ==
Aizenogyps is one of several condors known from the Pliocene to Pleistocene of Florida alongside the Californian condor and its close relative Gymnogyps kofordi. In addition to the type material from Haile 7C, remains previously assigned to Gymnogyps from the contemporary Macasphalt Shell Pit and Inglis IA may also be referable to Aizenogyps. During the time of its description Aizenogyps was regarded to be Pliocene in age, having been dated to the latest Blancan stage, with Emslie specifically giving an age of 2 million years. However, some more recent papers meanwhile regard the site of Haile 7C as falling within the earliest Pleistocene.

The articulation of many of the skeletons, presence of numerous freshwater and semi-aquatic animals and the nature of the sediments themselves suggests that these sites preserve what remains of an ancient lake present during the early Pleistocene. The terrestrial fauna meanwhile indicates that the surrounding environment was closed, consisting of forests or woodlands rather than open prairie. The aquatic fauna present at these sites includes various amphibians, a number of turtles including the snapping turtle Chelydra floridana and the crocodilian Alligator hailensis. The avifauna also includes a number of water-reliant species including several species of ducks, a plover, a dowitcher, a grebe and a kingfisher. The mammal fauna meanwhile includes a number of xenarthrans including a pampathere, a glyptodont, a true armadillo and giant sloths, tapirs, horses, deer and the gomphothere Cuvieronius. Among those most indicative of a forested environment was Erethizon poyeri, a relative of today's North American porcupine with a prehensile tail. The site of Haile 7C was originally regarded as distinct from Haile 7G, though more recent research suggests that the two sites were temporally and geographically contiguous and represented the same depositional environment.
