= Perugyps =

Perugyps Temporal range: Late Miocene - Early Pliocene ~Late Miocene–Early Pliocene

Scientific classification
- Kingdom: Animalia
- Phylum: Chordata
- Class: Aves
- Order: Accipitriformes
- Family: Cathartidae
- Genus: †Perugyps; Stucchi & Emslie, 2005
- Species: †P. diazi

Binomial name
- †Perugyps diazi Stucchi & Emslie, 2005

Extinct genus of birds

Perugyps is an extinct genus of condor from the Late Miocene to Early Pliocene Pisco Formation of Peru, which was also home to the later described condor Kuntur. It was described in 2005 on the basis of a number of isolated fossil remains including various parts of the wings, the legs and even a lower jaw. The fossil remains suggest that Perugyps was a large bird, perhaps around 7% larger than the Andean condor, which is regarded as the largest living bird of prey and one of the largest flying birds of today. It has been speculated that Perugyps would have fed on the carcasses of the numerous marine mammals of the Pisco Formation like modern vultures and that it could have also added to its diet by snatching chicks from the local seabird colonies.

== History and naming ==
Perugyps was described in 2005 by Marcelo Stucchi and Steven D. Emslie following the discovery of several isolated fossil bones at the Montemar (6.0–4.5 Ma) and Sacaco Sur localities of Peru's Pisco Formation. The holotype, a partial carpometacarpus, was collected by Stucchi personally in 2000, while the other material includes a lower jaw, a neck vertebra, a distal ulna, part of the coracoid, a distal tibiotarsus and a well-preserved tarsometatarsus as well as another partial carpometacarpus.

The name Perugyps is derived from the animals country of origin, Peru, in combination with the Greek word "gyps" meaning "vulture". The species was named in honor of Eusebio Díaz.

== Description ==
The holotype of Perugyps is a carpometacarpus, the result of the fusion between the carpal and metacarpal bones, placing it between the animal's wrist and the reduced finger bones. In the type description, Stucchi and Emslie note that the carpometacarpus of Perugyps preserves several features identifying it as a condor. In addition to the bones great size, they highlight that the processus extensorius is curved proximally (towards the body) and that the intermetacarpal tuberosity, a growth situated between the two fused halves of the bone, is low like in the two modern vultures and Breagyps. The anterior carpal fossa is described as less pneumatic than in extant forms. The fused section at the base of the bone, the proximal symphysis, is short like in the Andean condor, whereas its longer in Californian condors, turkey and black vultures. The referred carpometacarpus also shows that the muscle scar for the attachment of the flexor metacarpi muscle that is short and pronounced like in the Andean condor and the extinct La Brea condor Breagyps, though not as much as in turkey and black vultures.

Other forelimb material assigned to Perugyps include fragments of an ulna and a coracoid. Of the former only the distal end, i.e. the one closer to the wrist, is preserved. The bone resembles modern Andean and Californian condors in that it features a pronounced and robust process siting towards the side of the internal condyle, at the base of which sits a small pneumatic area. The same area differs significantly in other living New World vultures, with king vultures having a less robust process with a smaller pneumatic area whereas in black and turkey vultures the opposite is true, featuring a more robust process with an even larger pneumatic area. The anatomy of the external condyle meanwhile shows greater similarities to today's Andean condor, as it is not as narrow nor located as far up the shaft in either of these two species than in the Californian condor, though at the same time it is still narrower than in the Pleistocene genus Breagyps, which furthermore has a better developed internal condyle. Not much is preserved of the coracoid either, which is exclusively known from the sternal end. Suchhi and Emslie describe the bone as differing from all living cathartiids in having an internal angle that is both more robust, curved and with a lower-hanging rim in addition to the line for the muscle attachments being more distinct and stretching further up the shaft of the bone. Unlike in modern cathartiids, which have a shallow, not-rounded and often pneumatic sternocoracoidal impression, that of Perugyps is distinctly rounded, deeper and not pneumatic.

The only part of the skull attributed to Perugyps is a partial lower jaw notably preserving the mandibular symphysis. This part of the mandible, where the two halves meet along their midline, appears to be distinctly longer proportinally than in Californian condors as well as black and king vultures, about the same proportional length as in turkey vultures and shorter than in Andean condors. It is also wider than in any living cathartiid vulture. The downwards curvature of the lower jaw of Perugyps is not as abrupt as in Californian condors and both extant condor species have more pronounced and longer proximal ends and articular bones than Perugyps. On the other hand, the coronoid process of the dentary is taller than in any living cathartiid. In total dimensions the lower jaw of Perugyps was longer than those of both modern condor species. The one known neck vertebra, identified as the sixth by Stucchi and Emslie, generally resembles what is seen in the Andean condor and turkey vultures in shape and robustness and, in case of the former, size as well. Viewing the bone from the front shows that the external borders of the prezygopophyses are at the same height as the diapophyses, just as is the case in king and turkey vultures. The prezygopophyses are furthermore robuster, rounded and angled more forward than in either extant condor species while the postzygopophyses are likewise rounded and more angled outward.

Two leg bones were referred to Perugyps by Stucchi and Emslie, a distal tibiotarsus and a much more complete tarsometatarsus. The tendinal furrow of the former is deeper and more centered compared to extant New World vulture genera and the opening is located higher up on the shaft than in the modern forms as well. The internal side of the opening bears a distinct bony shelf resembling what can be found in the Californian condor and Geronogyps, whereas the same structure is notably smaller in Andean condors and almost absent in Coragyps. Stucchi and Emslie describe the tendinal groove passing beneath the supratendinal bridge as straight, a feature shared with turkey and king vultures. The area between the condyles is deeper than in all living cathartiids and even Geronogyps and the external condyle is more robust than in the living condor species. The tarsometatarsus is broadly described as robust, though it doesn't flare outwards as much towards the ends as in several other extant and extinct fossil cathartiids. The bone is diagnosed by possessing a distal external trochlea that is placed as low or even lower than the middle trochlea, which sets it apart from extant cathartiids in which it is placed higher up. In the 2015 description of Kuntur Stucchi and colleagues note that compared to said taxon, the anterior articular surface for the third metatarsal is smaller while the anterior surface for the second metatarsal is classed as moderate to large. The anterior metatarsal groove of Perugyps is deep and pronounced, extending halfway down the shaft of the bone, with the outer border of the groove slightly larger than the internal border. The same can be observed in the Andean condor and black vulture, while the borders of the groove are similar in size in Californian condores as well as turkey and king vultures.

According to Degrange and colleagues Perugyps was approximately 7% larger than modern Andean condors and the extinct Vultur messii, by extension making it smaller than Kuntur (approximately 12% larger than species of the genus Vultur).

== Classification ==
Perugyps was first classified as a condor by Stucchi and Emslie in their 2005 description based on what they describe as three clear characters of the carpometacarpus, one of which being the large size of the bone. In the 2015 description of Kuntur Stucchi and colleagues find a closer association between that taxon and other South American condors including Gymnogyps howardae, Geronogyps, the Andean condor and Perugyps.

== Paleobiology ==
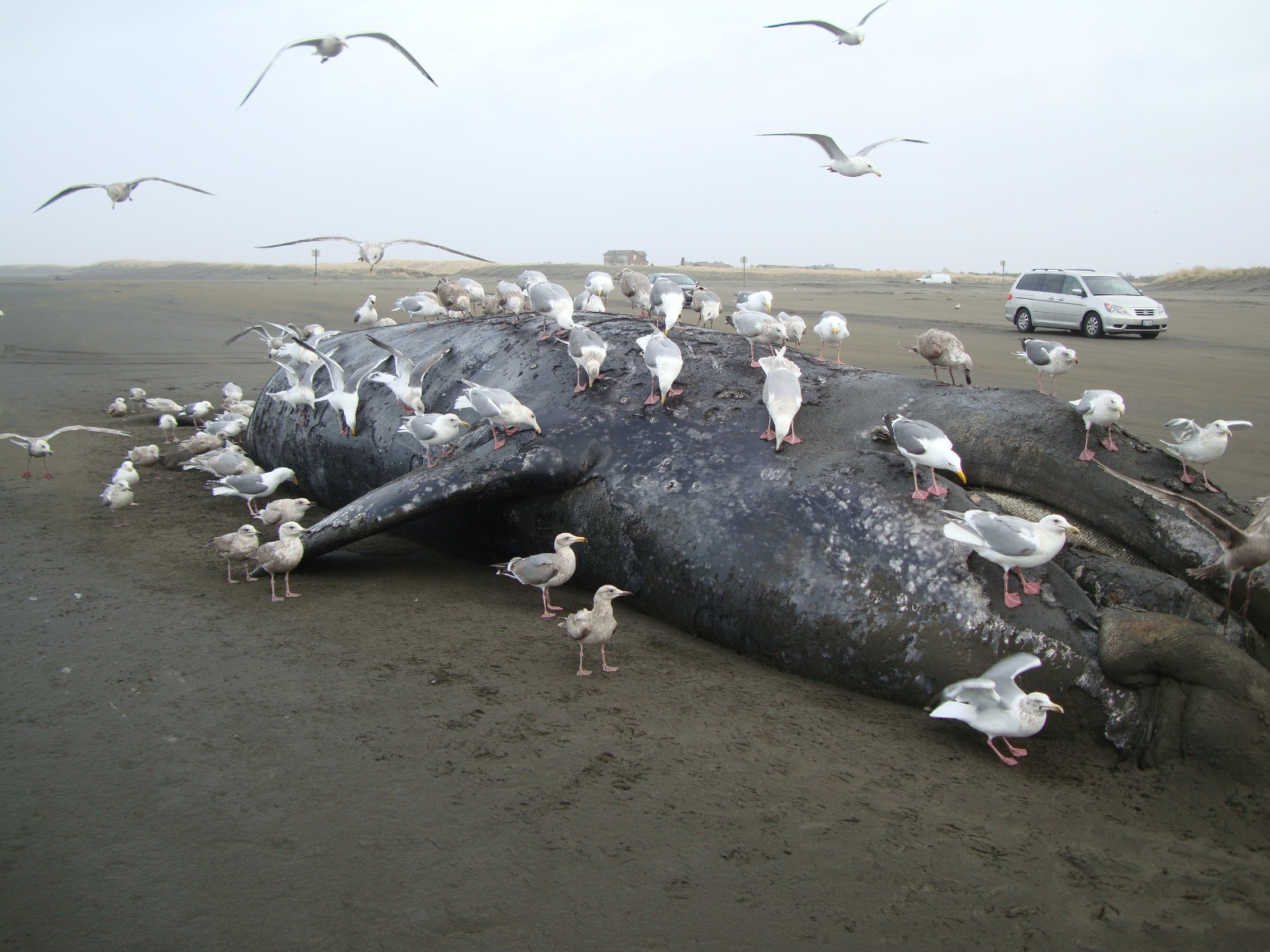
Perugyps likely would have scavenged the bodies of dead whales that washed ashore

Perugyps has been recovered from two localities of the Late Miocene to Early Pliocene Pisco Formation, specifically the localities of Montemar and Sacaco Sur. Like other outcrops of this formation these localities represent what were once coastal environments, in the case of Montemar and Sacaco Sur specifically environments consisting of protected beaches and reefs exposed to the currents. While arguably best known for its fossil whales, the formation also preserves a plethora of extinct birds in addition to Perugyps. This includes albatrosses, gulls, pelagornithids, boobies, cormorants, shorebirds, petrels and penguins. More specifically, the Montemar horizon, which has been dated to around the Tortonian-Messinian transition (7.3-7 Ma) or 6.0–4.5 Ma, previously yielded the fossils of Spheniscus megaramphus and Spheniscus urbinai, Sula magna, Sula sulita and Morus peruvianus as well as Pelagornis. The whale fauna is similarly diverse including Piscobalaena, Acrophyseter, Piscolithax, Pliopontos and two kogiid sperm whales, which shared the oceans with Otodus megalodon, Cosmopolitodus hastalis and Carcharodon hubbelli.

This diverse fauna of both seabirds and marine mammals was likely the backbone of Perugyps′ diet. Stucchi and Emslie suggest that much like Andean condors living along the Peruvian coast today it could have fed on the carcasses of marine mammals and may have even snatched the chicks of other birds while still alive. While Stucchi and Emslie initially supported this idea by highlighting that Perugyps was the only known terrestrial scavenger from the Pisco Formation, both would eventually come to describe a second condor from the Pisco Formation in the shape of Kuntur from the Late Miocene of the Ocucaje area.
