= Hadrogyps =

Hadrogyps Temporal range: Middle Miocene Barstovian

Scientific classification
- Kingdom: Animalia
- Phylum: Chordata
- Class: Aves
- Order: Accipitriformes
- Family: Cathartidae
- Genus: †Hadrogyps; Emslie, 1988
- Species: †H. aigialeus

Binomial name
- †Hadrogyps aigialeus Emslie, 1988

Extinct genus of cathartid vulture

Hadrogyps is an extinct genus of cathartid vulture from the Middle Miocene (Barstovian) Sharktooth Hill of California. It has been noted for its robust and collumnar tarsometatarsus.

== History and naming ==
Hadrogyps was described on the basis of a single complete tarsometatarsus recovered from the middle Miocene site of Sharktooth Hill in California. The specimen, LACM 123996, was discovered in 1982 by S. A. McLeod and is only slightly damaged, with the ends suffering from errosion and part of the distal shaft missing.

The name Hadrogyps is derived from the Greek "hadros" meaning "thick" or "stout" and "gyps", which means "vulture", reflecting the robust nature of the tarsometatarsus of this genus. The species name "aigialeus" translates to "of the shore" in reference to the type locality, which preserves a number of marine animals.

== Description ==
The most distinct anatomical feature of Hadrogyps is the fact that the shaft of the tarsometatarsus is quite robust, almost straight and rather collumnar in shape even towards the end, whereas in most other new world vultures the shaft begins to flare outward either gradually or even more steeply.

On the proximal end of the shaft the intercondylar prominence is described as moderately high and robust, effectively separating the internal and cotylae of the tarsometatarsus almost entirely the same way as seen in the modern Andean condor and king vulture. The anterior metatarsal groove is distinctly pronounced across 2/3rds of the shaft's length. Compared to this the groove is only pronounced for about a quarter to half the shaft's length in the much later taxon Breagyps and over half the shaft's length to its entirety in a number of other cathartids including almost all modern genera with the exception of Sarcorhamphus. Another distinguishing feature of the genus is the large size of the two proximal foramina, which are typically small in cathartids. The same is also applicable to the anterior distal foramen towards the opposite end of the bone. Typically large foramina are regarded as an indicator of a younger growth stage, but the degree to which the tarsometatarsus of Hadrogyps is ossified suggests that the animal was nearly fully grown. The proximal foramina are also described as more widely spaced compared to animals like the Peruvian genus Kuntur.

The posterior surface of the tarsometatarsal shaft is described as distinctly concave similar to Geronogyps and Sarcorhamphus, while in other new world vultures the posterior shaft is more generally flattened or only slightly concave. The ridge that extends below the hypotarsus is short, broad and rounded like in Breagyps, Pliogyps and black vultures, contrasting with the longer and narrower ridges present in other cathartids.

The second trochlea, corresponding to the innermost toe, is larger than in Kuntur and the middle trochlea, which attaches to the third (middle) toe is relatively long and narrow similar to the extant Andean condor and black vulture as well as the extinct Breagyps and Diatropornis.

In terms of size Hadrogyps is described as falling between the ranges of smaller cathartid vultures like black and turkey vultures and the large Californian and Andean condors. It's closest in size to Pliogyps and Sarcorhamphus, in particular the extant Sarcorhamphus papa, the king vulture. More specifically, the tarsometatarsus of Hadrogyps is shorter but more robust than that of S. papa but longer than that of Pliogyps.

== Classification ==
At the time of its description Hadrogyps was regarded as a potential member of the condor-clade within Cathartidae on account of a more laterally positioned metatarsal facet. However, it's precise relationship with other condors could not be determined.

== Paleobiology ==
The holotype specimen of Hadrogyps comes from the Mid Miocene (Barstovian) Sharktooth Hill, located in Kern County, California. The fauna of the site is predominantly marine, featuring both a number of both whales and pelagic birds. The site is not without terrestrial components either, preserving the fossils of terrestrial carnivorans, tapirs, camels and the horse Merychippus. Consequently, the size has been interpreted to represent a coastal environment.
