= Gobicathartes =

Gobicathartes Temporal range: Late Eocene

Scientific classification
- Kingdom: Animalia
- Phylum: Chordata
- Class: Aves
- Order: Accipitriformes
- Family: Cathartidae
- Genus: †Gobicathartes; Gorbatcheva et al., 2025
- Species: †G. prodigialipes

Binomial name
- †Gobicathartes prodigialipes Gorbatcheva et al., 2025

Extinct genus of New World vulture

Gobicathartes is an extinct monotypic genus of New World vulture that lived in Mongolia during the Late Eocene epoch. It is known from a single partial tarsometatarsus discovered in the 1970s that greatly resembles modern cathartids than any contemporary relatives and indicates a bird comparably in size to the cinereous or king vulture. The animal's great size may have been caused by the relatively more open environment of the Ergilin Dzo Formation, while other Eurasian new world vultures inhabited more closed environments. Gobicathartes suggests that the clade was relatively diverse prior to its extinction in Eurasia, which may have been caused by the rapid disappearance of woodland biomes.

== History and naming ==
The bone that would eventually form the basis of Gobicathartes was known to science for 40 years prior to the genus' naming, but in all this time was neither described nor figured. It was discovered in 1971 at Khoer Dzan (southeast Mongolia) at an outcrop of the Sevkhul Member of the Ergilin Dzo Formation and first appeared in literature as an unspecified specimen in a 1985 paper by Storrs Olson. Despite remaining undescribed, the specimen was subsequently alluded to by other researchers as an Asian member of Cathartidae. The specimen, a partial distal tarsometatarsus, was eventually described by Varvara Gorbatcheva, Nikita Zelenkov and Sara Bertelli in 2025 and given the name Gobicathartes. Although originally interpreted as Oligocene in age, the proper description places the deposits of the Ergilin Dzo Formation and therefore the fossil within the Late Eocene.

The generic name Gobicathartes references the Gobi Desert and the extant New World vulture genus Cathartes. The specific epithet of the type species, Gobicathartes prodigialipes, derives from the Latin words prodigialis, meaning 'strange', and pes, meaning 'foot'.

== Description ==
Overall the tarsometatarsus of Gobicathartes bears a greater resemblance to modern cathartid vultures than to the spatiotemporally closer Eocene cathartids of Europe. The shaft has an oval crosssection, unlike that of teratorns which is described as sub-square. Another deciding difference is that the foramen vasculare distale of Gobicathartes opens dorsally into a shallow, poorly defined sulcus like in cathartids, whereas in teratorns the foramen opens into a well-developed continuation of the sulcus extensorius.

On the plantar surface of the tarsometatarsus, the side of the bone that faces backwards and down, the foramen vasculare distale is approximately at the same level as the fossa for the first metatarsal, the hallux. The foramen is described as small and slit-like and shifted upwards on the shaft towards where the bird's torso would be. The fossa meanwhile is shallow with an irregularily oval outline. The plantar surface also features an area of attachment for the abductor muscle of the fourth (outermost) toe, which occupies less than half of the plantar surface, does not contact the fossa for the hallux and narrows proximally where its bordered by the crista plantaris lateralis and the sulcus flexorius.

The trochleae for the second to fourth toes are wide and massive with narrow, slit-like spaces between them, dubbed the incisurae intertrochleares. The trochlea for the second digit, the innermost toe, has an irregular trapezoidal shape and offset inwards relative to the shaft of the tarsometatarsus. The trochlea for the third (middle) toe is the largest and asymetrical in appearance, with the lateral (outer) rim extending further distally than the medial (inner) rim. Finally, the trochlea for the fourth (outermost) toe is smaller, with its outer margin almost level with the outer edge of the tarsometatarsal shaft, rather than protruding outward. The second and third toe have a similar distal extent, whereas the fourth is noticeably shorter. This is a key feature in distiguishing Gobicathartes and other cathartids from teratorns, in which the trochlea for digit two is less offset and smaller while the fourth is enlarged and extends further distally.

Observing the trochleae in distal view shows that though the trochlea for the second toe is straight, those for the third and fourth as well as the incisurae intertrochleares between are inclined medially thanks to their plantar surface. The trochlea metatarsi III extends further forward (dorsally) than its neighbors to either side and its articular surface connects to the shaft of the tarsometatarsus through a gentle slope well visible when viewed from the side.

Gobicathartes has also been described as significantly larger than other Eurasian cathartids, exceeding the extant black vulture and turkey vulture in size and approaching the dimensions of king vultures. It has also been compared to the Cinereous vulture in terms of size.

== Classification ==
The precise relationship between Gobicathartes and other cathartid vultures remains unclear. Morphologically the genus is closer to modern non-condor new world vultures like the king vulture, black vulture and the genus Cathartes than to contemporary forms from Europe, condors or teratorns. However, this resemblance does not necessarily indicate that these forms must have been close relatives. In the case of teratornithids for example, the striking differences in tarsometatarsus anatomy are caused by the specialisation of the group. It is therefore possible that the resemblance between modern cathartids and Gobicathartes is not due to a close relationship to the exclusion of teratorns, but rather the result of modern cathartids retaining the groups plesiomorphic condition. This means that Gobicathartes could have been a stem-cathartid that split off prior to the divergence between extant new world vultures and teratorns.

== Paleobiology ==
Gobicathartes has been recovered from the Late Eocene Sevkhul Member of the Ergilin Dzo Formation, located in today's southeast Mongolia. Gorbatcheva and colleagues describe the formation as already having featured semi-open environments compared to contemporary European localities. Tsubamoto and colleagues classify the formation as hot/warm and humid with a relatively closed environment, as indicated by the presence of brontotheres and herbivores with low-crowned dentition. However, Tsubamoto and colleagues also acknowledge that the formation was still likely more arid than other contemporary sites, seeing as crocodile remains are rare and primates entirely absent. Tsubamoto and colleagues furthermore argue that the formation represents a floodplain environment around a braided river system rather than a laucustrine biome as had been suggested previously.

Most fossil remains come from the Sevkhul and Ergilin Members of the Formation and showcase a diverse fauna indicative of a late Eocene age. Fish remains include the fossils of bowfins and catfish while reptiles are represented by a number of turtles, agamids and a crocodilian. The avifauna, in addition to Gobicathartes, includes waterfowl, rails, cranes, birds of prey, herons and gulls. The mammal fauna is dominated by brontotheres and rhinos (including paraceratherids), but also includes chalicotheres, ruminants, anthracotheres and a number of entelodonts. Non-ungulate mammals include predators like nimravids, amphicyonoids, mesonychids and hyaenodonts as well as leptictidans, lagomorphs, rodents and more.

== Evolutionary significance and extinction ==
The more open environment of the Ergilin Dzo Formation may have been a factor in the animal reaching a greater size relative to its older European relatives, which inhabitet more forested biomes. The absence of cathartids from younger Oligocene strata could be tied to the then ongoing expansion of open landscapes, with forests possibly disappearing quicker than these birds could adapt to. The diversification of raptors, in particular old world vultures, may have been another factor in the groups extinction in Eurasia. By contrast North America retained a more closed forested environment up until the Miocene before the spread of open landscapes, which may have been more favorable to the dispersal and survival of cathartids. The first undisputed cathartids and teratorns appear during the Upper Eocene and Early Oligocene of Brazil and the Late Miocene condor Kuntur shares features of its anatomy with Gobicathartes that are not present in recent new world vulture. All these together may be indicative of an Eurasian origin of cathartids, with the group first diversifying in the old world and then crossing Beringia into the Americas, possibly during the Oligocene. The origin of teratorns within this framework remains questionable and Gorbatchev and colleagues do not rule out the idea that they arrived in South America via an entirely unrelated dispersal event from cathartids.
