= Dryornis =

Dryornis Temporal range: early Miocene (Santacrucian)–early Pliocene (Zanclean), 23.03–3.8 Ma

Scientific classification
- Kingdom: Animalia
- Phylum: Chordata
- Class: Aves
- Order: Accipitriformes
- Family: Cathartidae
- Genus: †Dryornis; Moreno & Mercerat, 1891

Type species
- †Dryornis pampeanus Moreno & Mercerat, 1891

Other species
- †Dryornis hatcheri Degrange, 2022

Extinct genus of birds

Dryornis (meaning "tree bird"), also called the Argentinian vulture, is an extinct genus of cathartid (New World vulture) known from the early Miocene–early Pliocene of Argentina. The genus contains two species, Dryornis pampeanus and Dryornis hatcheri.

== Discovery and naming ==
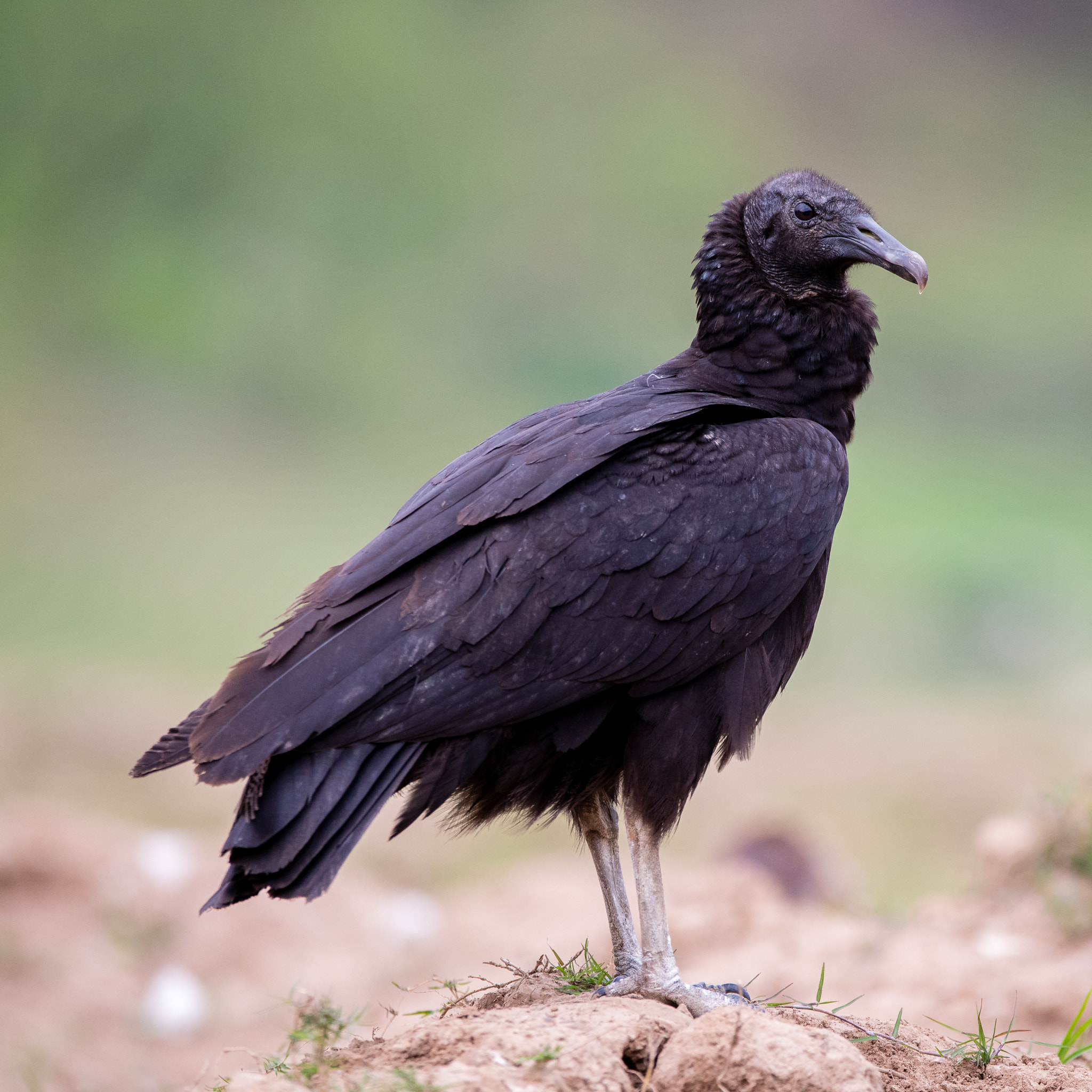
Photograph of an extant black vulture (Coragyps atratus), a probable close relative of Dryornis

Dryornis was first described in 1891 by Argentine paleontologists Francisco Moreno and Alcides Mercerat, the type species being D. pampeanus, based on the distal portion of a right humerus and a right femur that was supposedly part of the same individual, though it has since been referred to the phorusrhacid Mesembriornis milneedwardsi. The fossils had been collected from the Pliocene age deposits of the Monte Hermoso Formation in Buenos Aires, Argentina and have since been deposited at the Museo de La Plata under specimen number MLP 20–169. Between 1896 and 1899, the American Princeton University dispatched several expeditions to the Miocene Santa Cruz Formation of Santa Cruz, Argentina to recover fossils of taxa previously described by paleontologists like Moreno, Mercerat, and Florentino Ameghino. These expeditions were led by notable fossil collector John Bell Hatcher, who in 1899, unearthed a fragmentary left humerus that was later referred to the "terror bird" Phorusrhacos in 1932. This humerus was deposited at the Yale Peabody Museum under catalogue number YPM-PVVU 15866. It remained unstudied until 2022, when Argentine paleontologist Federico J. Degrange noticed its true affinities and described it as a new species of Dryornis, D. hatcheri.

D. pampeanus was only known from the type specimen until a 2021 paper described an individual preserving a: right pectoral girdle, articulated partial right forelimb, incomplete right scapula, and fragments from the sternum and tibiotarsus. The paper also assigned an isolated distal left ulna and another specimen preserving an incomplete right ulna and proximal right radius fragment. All of the fossils had been collected from the La Estafeta Beach in Mar del Plata, Buenos Aires, Argentina and were from the Late Pliocene aged Chapadmalal Formation. The fossils allowed more detailed analysis of the species' phylogeny and revealed many novel diagnostic characteristics for the species.

== Description ==
Dryornis represents the largest known cathartiform other than the Teratornithidae. Analysis of the known fossil materials suggests that it had a body mass of 26 kilograms (57 lb), 57% greater than Vultur grypus (Andean condor) and 94% greater than Cathartes aura (turkey vulture). In comparison, Argentavis magnificens (the giant teratorn)—the largest known bird—has been estimated at 70–80 kg (150–180 lb). The wingspan of Dryornis pampeanus was likely between 3.87–4 metres (12.7–13.1 ft). One feature distinguishing Dryornis from other cathartids is the presence of a much more pneumatized sternum, likely an adaptation for its size and flight capabilities.

Dryornis would have been a scavenger, and the only such predator in its ecosystem.

== Classification ==
In their phylogenetic analyses, Degrange et al. (2021) recovered Dryornis as a member of the Cathartidae and sister taxon to Coragyps + Cathartes. It was thus more closely related to vultures than to true condors (Vultur, Gymnogyps).

- Cathartidae
  - - Sarcoramphus papa
    - - Gymnogyps californianus
      - Vultur gryphus
  - - †Dryornis pampeanus
    - - Coragyps atratus
      - - Cathartes melambrotus
        - - Cathartes burriovianus
          - Cathartes aura
