= Phasmagyps =

Phasmagyps Temporal range: Chadronian

Scientific classification
- Kingdom: Animalia
- Phylum: Chordata
- Class: Aves
- Order: Cathartiformes
- Family: Cathartidae
- Genus: †Phasmagyps; Wetmore, 1927
- Species: †P. patritus

Binomial name
- †Phasmagyps patritus Wetmore, 1927

Extinct genus of birds

Phasmagyps, is an extinct genus of New World vulture in the family Cathartidae, known from one Oligocene fossil found in Colorado. The genus contains a single described species, Phasmagyps patritus which is possibly the oldest New World vulture known, though its placement in the family Cathartidae has been questioned.

== History and classification ==
Phasmagyps is known from a single fragmentary fossil bone, the holotype housed in the paleontology collections of the Colorado Museum of Natural History in Boulder, Colorado and given the number 1078. In 1923 Philip Reinheinter collected the specimen from the Weld County Trigonias quarry, possibly a fossilized watering hole. The quarry worked sedimentary rocks that are positioned approximately 25 feet (7.6 m) above the contact between the Pierre Shale and the Chadron Formation, thus dating the fossils to the Lower Chadronian. The fossil was first studied by the American paleontologist and ornithologist Alexander Wetmore; his 1927 type description of the new genus and species was published in the journal Proceedings of the Colorado Museum of Natural History. In the description, Wetmore did not give any etymological explanations for the genus and species names, though phasma is Latin and Greek for a phantom or apparition and Gyps identifies the genus as a vulture. The fossil was reexamined in the early 1980s by avian paleontologist Storrs L. Olson. In a 1985 paper he gives a brief comment on the genus. He stated without going into specific details, that while the fossil is superficially similar to those of Cathartidae members, however it possesses notable features which are different and as such he regarded the position of the genus as problematic. In their 2005 description of a Peruvian fossil, Marcelo Stucchi and Steven Emslie noted the disputed nature of Phasmagyps, but maintained the placement in Cathartidae and noted the genus as the oldest member of the family in the Americas.

== Description ==
When first described by Wetmore, Phasmagyps was described as being one third larger than the modern Black vulture, Coragyps atratus. This is contradicted by James Ducey's 1992 paper which lists Phasmagyps as being "not much larger than the Black Vulture". The single known fossil is a partial upper leg bone, specifically the lower section of the right tibiotarsus. As preserved, the largest diameter of the bone is 17.9 millimetres (0.70 in) around the outer condyle, and the width across the condyles is 14.9 millimetres (0.59 in). The diameter at the smallest area of the preserved bone shaft is 9.2 millimetres (0.36 in).
