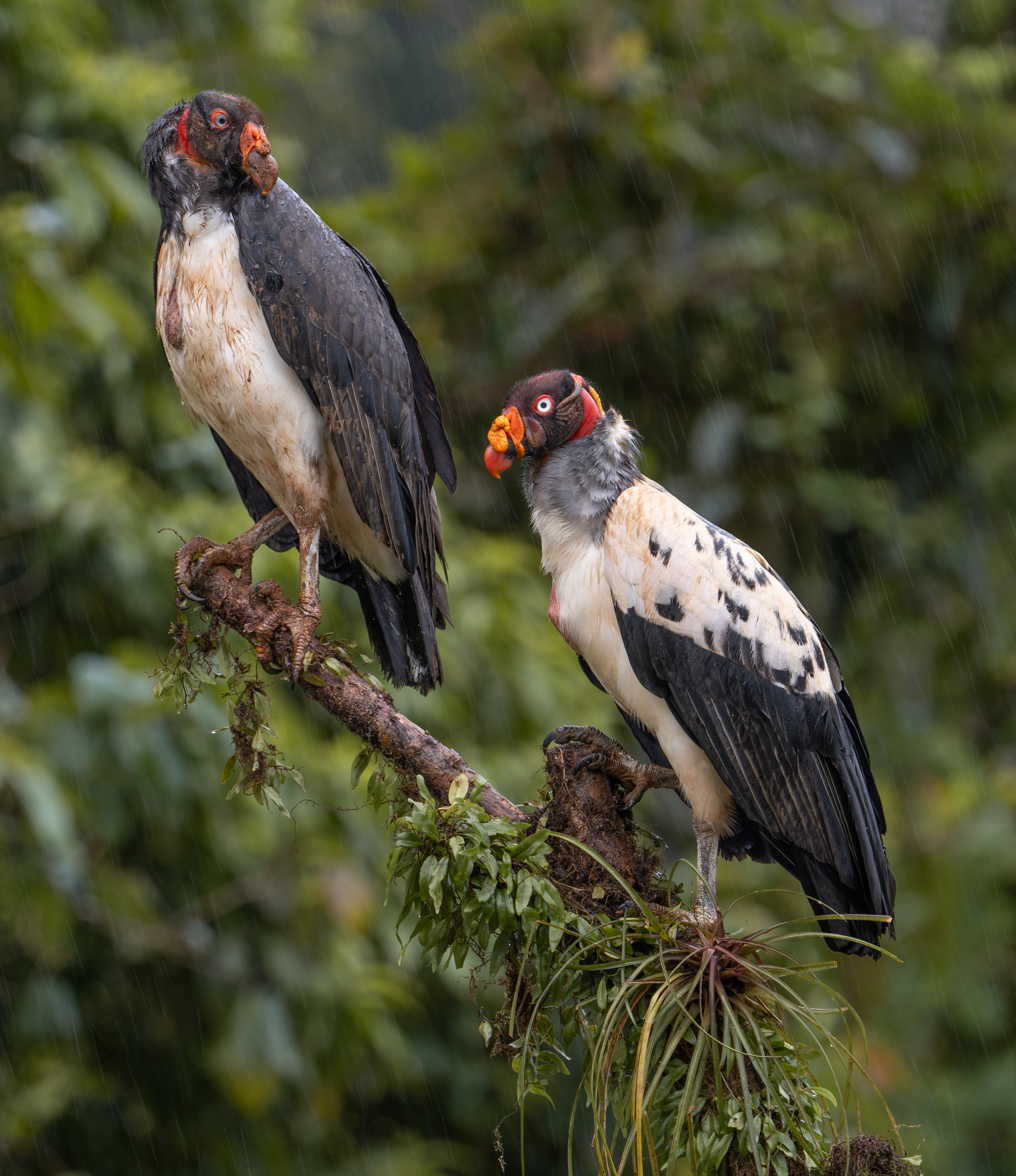
- Juvenile and adult king vulture (Sarcoramphus papa)

Scientific classification
- Kingdom: Animalia
- Phylum: Chordata
- Class: Aves
- Order: Cathartiformes
- Family: Cathartidae
- Genus: Sarcoramphus; Duméril, 1805

Species
- Sarcoramphus papa; †Sarcoramphus fischeri; †Sarcoramphus kernense; †Sarcoramphus sacra ?; †(?)Sarcoramphus solala ?

= Sarcoramphus =

Sarcoramphus Temporal range: Pliocene - Recent

Genus of New World vulture

Sarcoramphus is a genus of New World vulture that contains a single extant species, the king vulture (Sarcoramphus papa).

Extinct members of the genus include the Kern vulture (Sarcoramphus kernense) from the mid-Pliocene of North America, and Sarcoramphus fischeri from the Late Pleistocene of Peru.

A hypothetical species known as the painted vulture is also assigned to this genus, but no concrete proof of its existence has been found as of yet.
