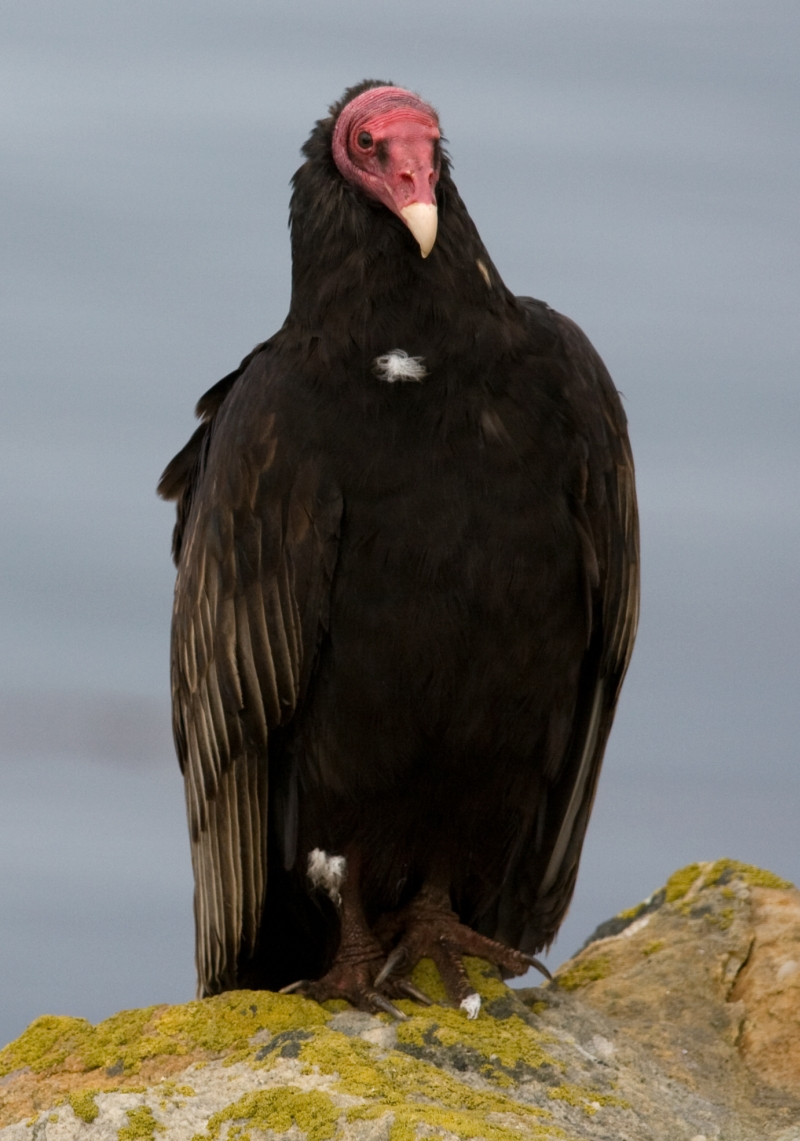
- Turkey vulture

Scientific classification
- Kingdom: Animalia
- Phylum: Chordata
- Class: Aves
- Order: Cathartiformes
- Family: Cathartidae; Lafresnaye, 1839

Genera
- Cathartes; Coragyps; Gymnogyps; Sarcoramphus; Vultur
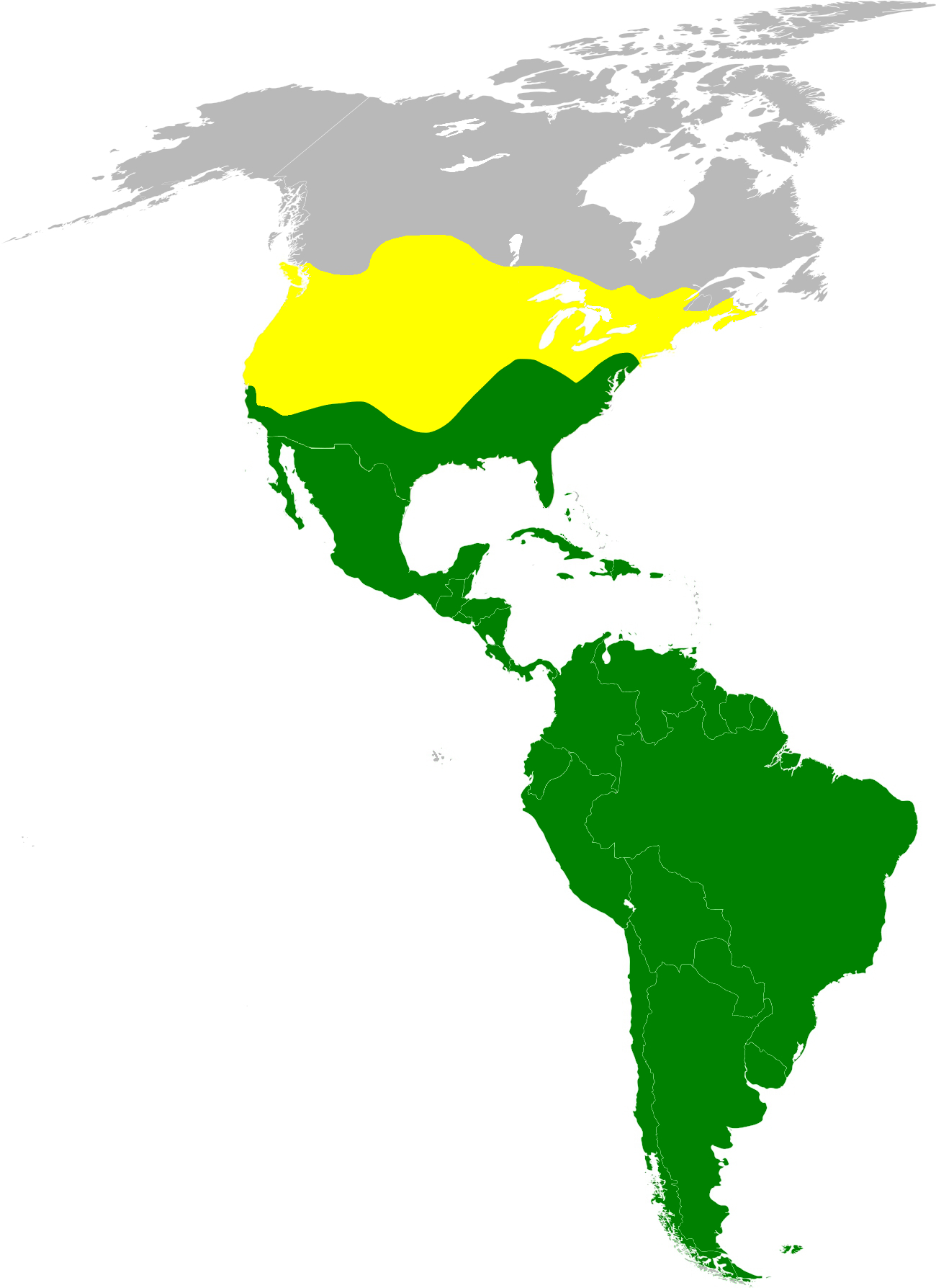
- Approximate Cathartidae range map Summer-only range of turkey vulture At least one species present year-round

Synonyms
- Vulturidae Illiger, 1811

= New World vulture =

New World vultures Temporal range: Paleocene – Holocene, 50–0 Ma

Family of birds

Cathartidae, commonly known as New World vultures and condors, are a family of birds of prey consisting of seven extant species in five genera. It includes five extant vultures and two extant condors found in the Americas. They are known as "New World" vultures to distinguish them from Old World vultures, with which the Cathartidae does not form a single clade despite the two being similar in appearance and behavior as a result of convergent evolution.

Like other vultures, New World vultures are scavengers, having evolved to feed off of the carcasses of dead animals without any notable ill effects. Some species of New World vulture (Cathartes sp.) have a good sense of smell, whereas Old World vultures find carcasses exclusively by sight. Other adaptations shared by both Old and New World vultures include a bald head, devoid of feathers which helps prevent rotting matter from accumulating while feeding, and an extremely disease-resistant digestive system to protect against dangerous pathogens found in decaying meat.

== Taxonomy and systematics ==
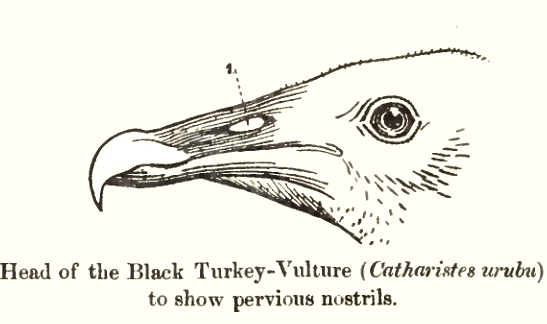
A pervious nostril is typical of the family.

The family Cathartidae was introduced (as the subfamily Cathartinae) by the French ornithologist Frédéric de Lafresnaye in 1839. The New World vultures comprise seven species in five genera, being Coragyps, Cathartes, Gymnogyps, Sarcoramphus, and Vultur. Of these, only Cathartes is not monotypic. The family's scientific name, Cathartidae, comes from cathartes, Greek for "purifier". Although New World vultures and Old World vultures are not very closely related, they share many resemblances because of convergent evolution. Phylogenetic analyses including all Cathartidae species found two primary clades. The first consists of black vultures (Coragyps atratus) together with the three Cathartes species (lesser yellow-headed vultures (C. burrovianus), greater yellow-headed vultures (C. melambrotus), and turkey vultures (C. aura)), while the second consists of king vultures (Sarcoramphus papa), California condors (Gymnogyps californianus) and Andean condors (Vultur gryphus).

New World vultures were traditionally placed in a family of their own in the Falconiformes. However, in the late 20th century some ornithologists argued that they are more closely related to storks on the basis of karyotype. Thus some authorities placed them in the Ciconiiformes with storks and herons; Sibley and Monroe (1990) even considered them a subfamily of the storks. This was criticized and an early DNA sequence study was based on erroneous data and subsequently retracted.

Recent multi-locus DNA studies on the evolutionary relationships between bird groups indicate that New World vultures are related to the other birds of prey, excluding the Falconidae. This analysis argues that New World vultures should either be a part of the new order Accipitriformes or part of the order Cathartiformes closely related to, but distinct from, other birds of prey.

Taxonomic authorities have differed on whether to include Cathartidae within Accipitriformes or recognize it as a separate order, Cathartiformes. The IOC World Bird List adopted the former treatment, whereas the American Ornithological Society, Handbook of the Birds of the World (HBW) taxonomy, and eBird/Clements taxonomy recognized Cathartiformes. AviList adopted Cathartiformes as a separate order.

These families are basal members of the recently recognized clade Afroaves.

Cathartidae extant species
Genus	Common and binomial names	Image	Range	Population estimate	Conservation status
Coragyps Le Maout, 1853	Black vulture Coragyps atratus		South America and north to US	50 – 100 million mature individuals	Least concern
Cathartes Illiger, 1811	Turkey vulture Cathartes aura		Throughout the Americas to southern Canada	28 million individuals	Least concern
Cathartes Illiger, 1811	Lesser yellow-headed vulture Cathartes burrovianus		South America and north to Mexico	500,000–4,999,999 mature individuals	Least concern
Cathartes Illiger, 1811	Greater yellow-headed vulture Cathartes melambrotus		Amazon Basin of tropical South America		Least concern
Gymnogyps Lesson, 1842	California condor Gymnogyps californianus		California and parts of northern Arizona, formerly widespread throughout the mountain ranges of Western North America	607 (392 wild, 215 in captivity)	Critically endangered
Vultur Linnaeus, 1758	Andean condor Vultur gryphus		Andes	Maximum estimate: 6,700 mature individuals	Vulnerable
Sarcoramphus Duméril, 1805	King vulture Sarcoramphus papa		Southern Mexico to northern Argentina	Unknown	Least concern

=== Extinct species and fossils ===
The fossil history of the Cathartidae is complex, and many taxa that may possibly have been New World vultures have at some stage been treated as early representatives of the family. There is no unequivocal European record from the Neogene.

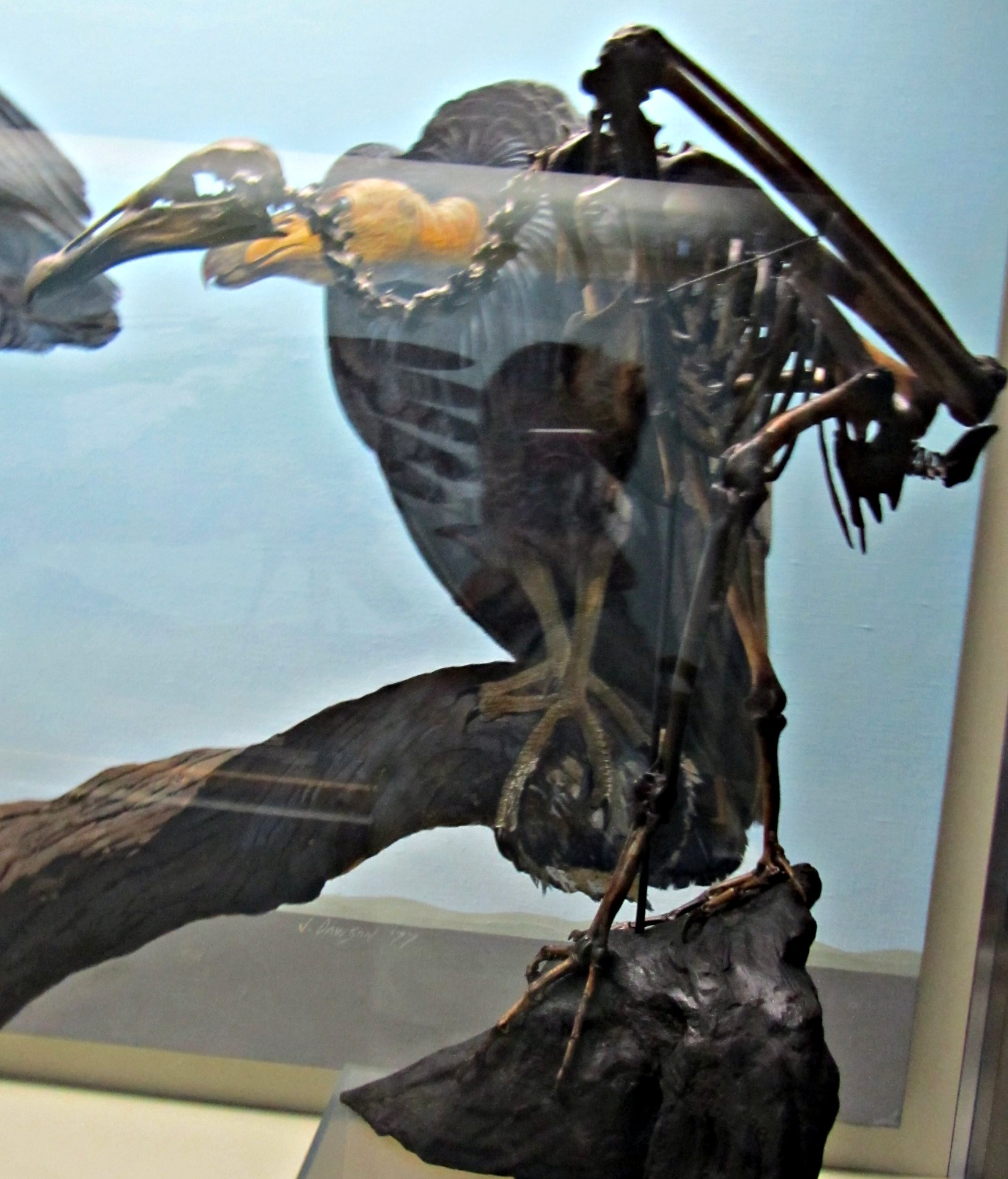
Fossil of the extinct Breagyps clarki

It is clear that the Cathartidae had a much higher diversity in the Plio-Pleistocene, rivalling the current diversity of Old World vultures and their relatives in shapes, sizes, and ecological niches. Extinct taxa include:

- Gobicathartes Late Eocene of Mongolia
- Diatropornis Late Eocene/Early Oligocene – ?Middle Oligocene of France
- Phasmagyps Chadronian of Colorado
- Brasilogyps Late Oligocene/Early Miocene of Brazil
- Hadrogyps Middle Miocene of SW North America
- Cathartidae gen. et sp. indet. Late Miocene/Early Pliocene of Lee Creek Mine, US
- Pliogyps Late Miocene – Late Pliocene of S North America
- Perugyps Pisco Late Miocene/Early Pliocene of SC Peru
- Dryornis Early – Late? Pliocene of Argentina; may belong to modern genus Vultur
- Cathartidae gen. et sp. indet. Middle Pliocene of Argentina
- Aizenogyps Late Pliocene of SE North America
- Breagyps Late Pleistocene of SW North America
- Geronogyps Late Pleistocene of Argentina and Peru
- Gymnogyps varonai Late Quaternary of Cuba
- Wingegyps Late Pleistocene of Brazil
- Pleistovultur Late Pleistocene/Early Holocene of Brazil
- Cathartidae gen. et sp. indet. Cuba
- Gymnogyps amplus Late Pleistocene – Holocene of W North America
- Kuntur cardenasi (Stucchi et al. 2015)

== Description ==
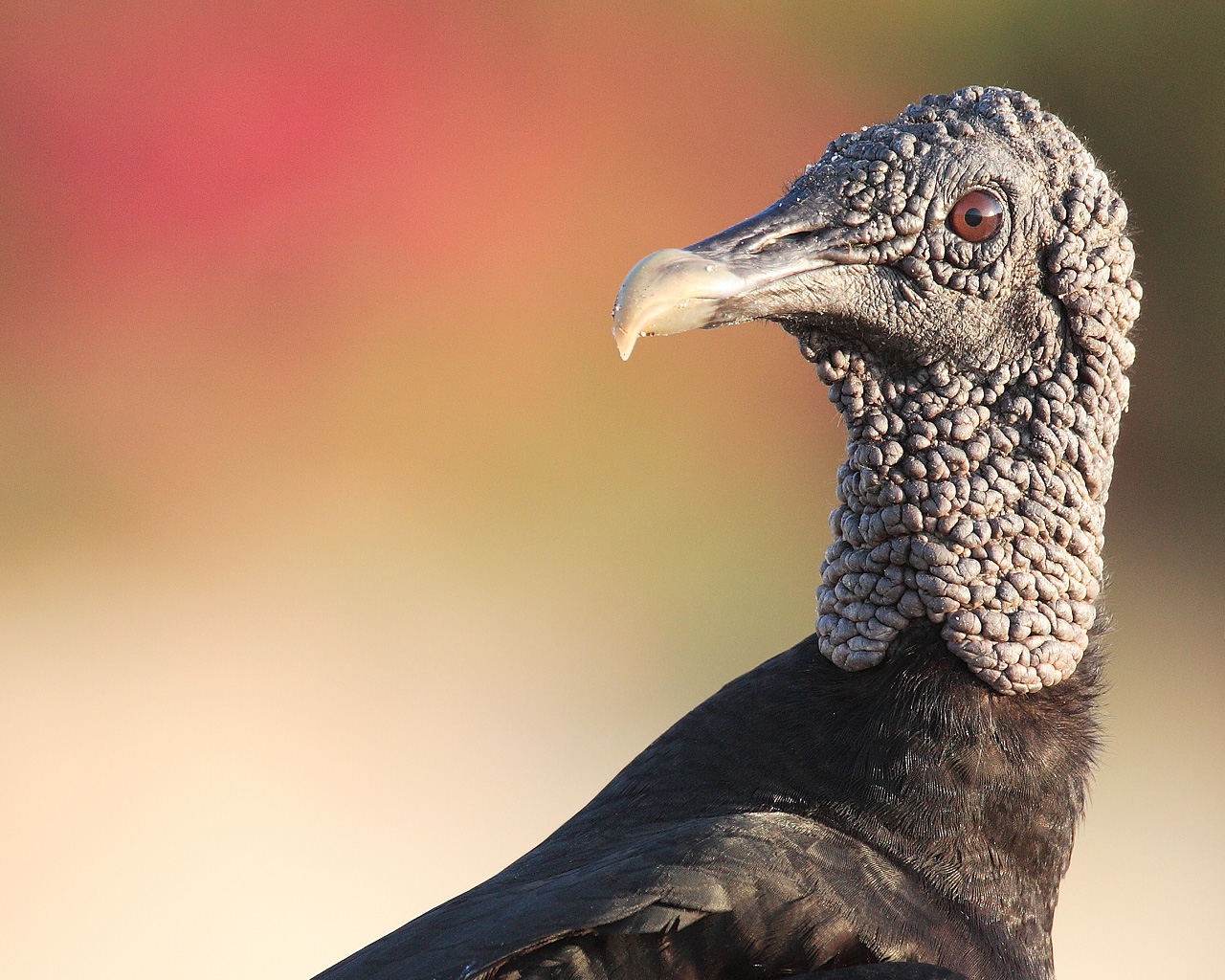
The featherless head of the American black vulture, Coragyps atratus brasiliensis, reduces bacterial growth from eating carrion.

New World vultures are generally large, ranging in length from the lesser yellow-headed vulture at 56–61 centimeters (22–24 inches) up to the California and Andean condors, both of which can reach 120 centimeters (48 inches) in length and weigh 12 or more kilograms (26 or more pounds). Plumage is predominantly black or brown, and is sometimes marked with white. All species have featherless heads and necks. In some, this skin is brightly colored, and in the king vulture it is developed into colorful wattles and outgrowths.

All New World vultures have long, broad wings and a stiff tail, suitable for soaring. They are the best adapted to soaring of all land birds. The feet are clawed but weak and not adapted to grasping. The front toes are long with small webs at their bases. No New World vulture possesses a syrinx, the vocal organ of birds. Therefore, the voice is limited to infrequent grunts and hisses.

The beak is slightly hooked and is relatively weak compared with those of other birds of prey. This is because it is adapted to tear the weak flesh of partially rotted carrion, rather than fresh meat. The nostrils are oval and set in a soft cere. The nasal passage is perforate, not divided by a septum, so that when looking from the side, one can see through the beak. The eyes are prominent, and, unlike those of eagles, hawks, and falcons, they are not shaded by a brow bone. Members of Coragyps and Cathartes have a single incomplete row of eyelashes on the upper lid and two rows on the lower lid, while Gymnogyps, Vultur, and Sarcoramphus lack eyelashes altogether.

New World vultures have the unusual habit of urohidrosis, or defecating on their legs to cool them evaporatively. As this behavior is also present in storks, it is one of the arguments for a close relationship between the two groups.

== Distribution and habitat ==
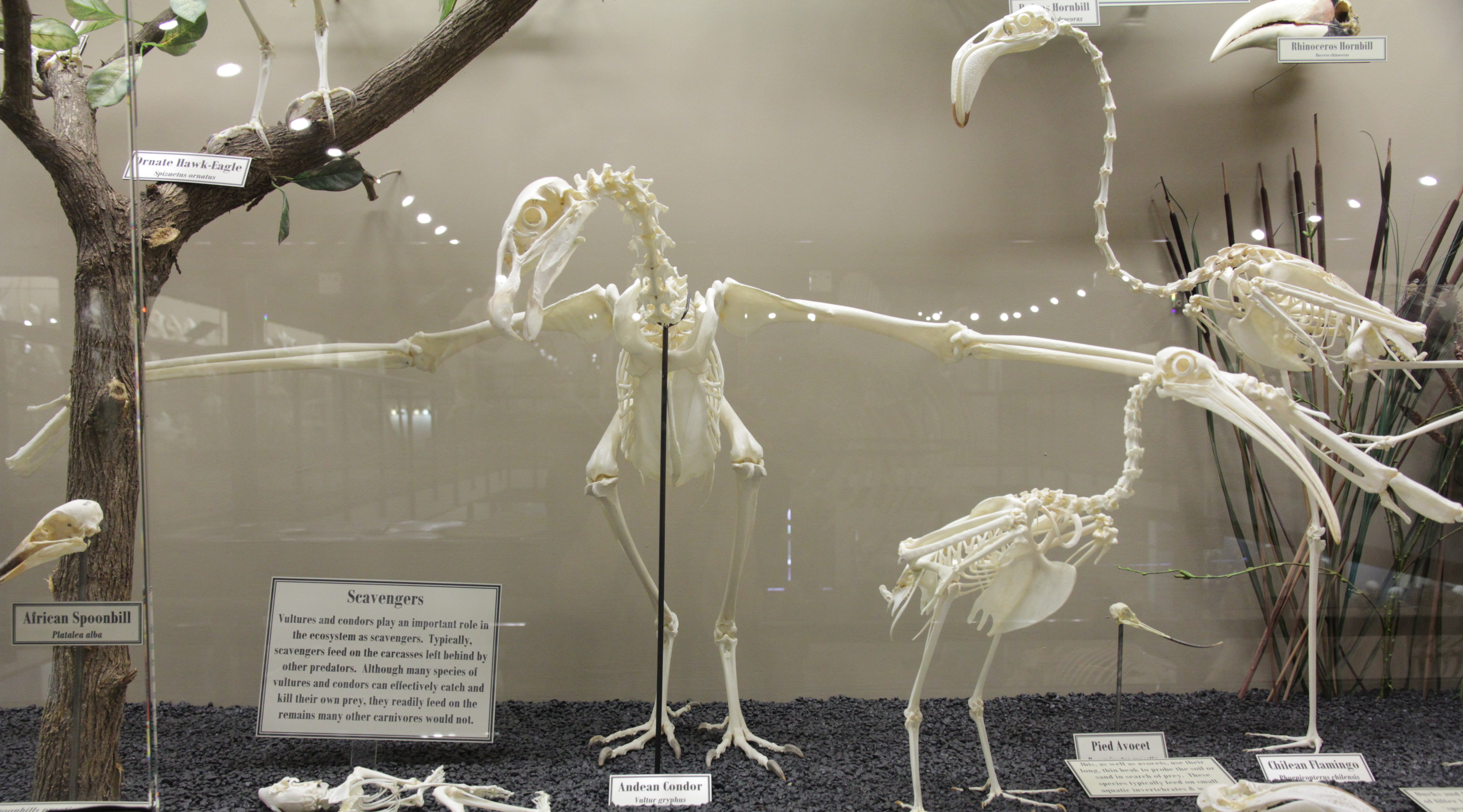
Andean condor skeleton (Museum of Osteology)

New World vultures are restricted to the western hemisphere, ranging from southern Canada to South America. Most species are mainly resident, but the turkey vulture breeds in Canada and the northern US and migrates south in the northern winter. New World vultures inhabit a large variety of habitats and ecosystems, ranging from deserts to tropical rainforests and at heights of sea level to mountain ranges. These species of birds are also occasionally seen in human settlements, perhaps emerging to feed upon the food sources provided from roadkills.

== Behavior and ecology ==
=== Breeding ===
New World vultures and condors do not build nests, but lay eggs on bare surfaces. On average one to three eggs are laid, depending on the species. Chicks are naked on hatching and later grow down. Like most birds, the parents feed the young by regurgitation. The young are altricial, fledging in 2 to 3 months. California Condor chicks fledge anywhere from 5–6 months, while Andean condor chicks fledge anywhere from 6–10 months.

=== Feeding ===
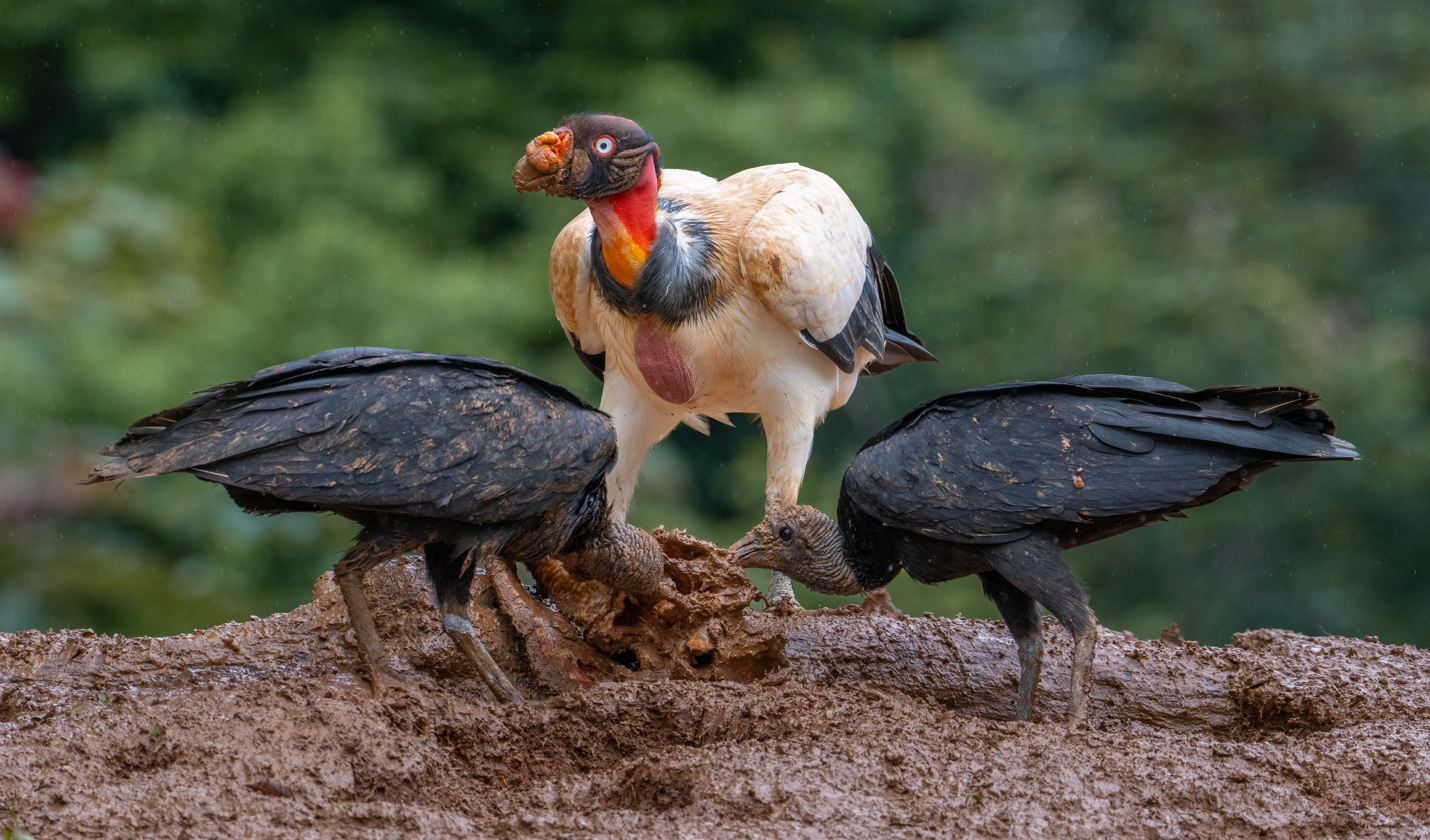
King vulture and American black vultures feeding on a carcass

All living species of New World vultures and condors are scavengers. Their diet consists primarily of carrion, and they are commonly seen near carcasses. Other additions to the diet include fruit (especially rotten fruit) and garbage. The genus Cathartes locates carrion by detecting the scent of ethyl mercaptan, a gas produced by the bodies of decaying animals. The olfactory lobe of the brains in these species, which is responsible for processing smells, is particularly large compared to that of other animals. Other species, such as the American black vulture and the king vulture, have weak senses of smell and find food only by sight, sometimes by following Cathartes vultures and other scavengers.

=== Tolerance to bacterial toxins in decaying meat ===
Vultures possess a very acidic digestive system, with their gut dominated by two species of anaerobic bacteria that help them withstand toxins present in decaying prey. In a 2014 study of 50 (turkey and black) vultures, researchers analyzed the microbial community or microbiome of the facial skin and the large intestine. The facial bacterial flora and the gut flora overlapped somewhat, but in general, the facial flora was much more diverse than the gut flora, which is in contrast to other vertebrates, where the gut flora is more diverse. Two anaerobic faecal bacteria groups that are pathogenic in other vertebrates stood out: Clostridia and Fusobacteriota (formerly Fusobacteria). They were especially common in the gut with Clostridia DNA sequence counts between 26% and 85% relative to total sequence counts, and Fusobacteriota between 0.2% and 54% in black vultures and 2% to 69% of all counts in turkey vultures. Unexpectedly, both groups of anaerobic bacteria were also found on the air-exposed facial skin samples, with Clostridia at 7–40% and Fusobacteriota up to 23%. It is assumed that vultures acquire them when they insert their heads into the body cavities of rotten meat. The regularly ingested Clostridia and Fusobacteriota outcompete other bacterial groups in the gut and become predominant. Genes that encode tissue-degrading enzymes and toxins that are associated with Clostridium perfringens have been found in the vulture gut metagenome. This supports the hypothesis that vultures do benefit from the bacterial breakdown of carrion, while at the same time tolerating the bacterial toxins.

== Status and conservation ==
The California condor is critically endangered. It formerly ranged from Baja California to British Columbia, but by 1937 was restricted to California. In 1987, all surviving birds were removed from the wild into a captive breeding program to ensure the species' survival. As of 2020, the Yurok Tribe and the California Condor Recovery Program reported the total population at 504: 329 in the wild and 175 in captivity.

The Andean condor is vulnerable. The American black vulture, turkey vulture, lesser yellow-headed vulture, and greater yellow-headed vulture are listed as species of Least Concern by the IUCN Red List. The king vulture is also listed as Least Concern, although there is evidence of a decline in the population.

== In culture ==
According to one source, the king vulture appears in a variety of Maya hieroglyphs in Mayan codices. The king vulture is commonly represented, with its glyph being easily distinguishable by the knob on the bird's beak and by the concentric circles that represent the bird's eyes. It is sometimes portrayed as a god with a human body and a bird head. According to Mayan mythology, this god often carried messages between humans and the other gods. In other sources (https://en.wikisource.org/wiki/Mexican_Arch%C3%A6ology/Chapter_3 and cozcacuauhtli), a glyph of a vulture, believed to be a king vulture, is represented as Cozcacuauhtli (or Cozcaquauhtli) in the Aztec calendar and in Aztec codices.

The American black vulture is normally connected with death or shown as a bird of prey, and its glyph is often depicted attacking humans. This species lacks the religious connections that the king vulture has. While some of the glyphs clearly show the American black vulture's open nostril and hooked beak, some are assumed to be this species because they are vulture-like, painted black, and lack the king vulture's knob.

== See also ==
- Old World vultures
- Teratornithidae
- Thunderbird (cryptozoology)
- Birds of prey
