= Diatropornis =

Diatropornis Temporal range: Late Eocene–Early Oligocene

Scientific classification
- Kingdom: Animalia
- Phylum: Chordata
- Class: Aves
- Order: Cathartiformes
- Genus: †Diatropornis; Milne-Edwards 1892

Extinct vulture genus

Diatropornis is an extinct genus of vultures dated to the period from late Eocene to early Oligocene. Diatropornis ellioti has a known location of Phosphorites du Quercy and Boussac, in France. Milne-Edwards described the bird, at that stage known as Tapinopus ellioti, as having mainly a terrestrial rather than aerial existence, and had a diet of insects, small mammals, vertebrates, snakes and amphibians. Oberholser (1899) is also cited at the genus level with his renaming to Diatropornis.

The phylogenetic position of Diatropornis remains uncertain. Although it has been regarded as a stem-group member of Cathartidae, Mayr (2009) suggested that it might instead belong to the stem group of a more inclusive clade comprising Cathartidae and Teratornithidae.
