= Brasilogyps =

Brasilogyps Temporal range: Late Oligocene or Early Miocene

Scientific classification
- Kingdom: Animalia
- Phylum: Chordata
- Class: Aves
- Order: Accipitriformes
- Family: Cathartidae
- Genus: †Brasilogyps; Alvarenga, 1985
- Species: †B. faustoi

Binomial name
- †Brasilogyps faustoi Alvarenga, 1985

Extinct genus of birds

Brasilogyps is an extinct genus of New World vulture from the Late Oligocene or Early Miocene of the Tremembé Formation, Taubaté Basin, São Paulo state, Brazil. The type species is B. faustoi. It is related to Coragyps and slightly larger than C. occidentalis.
