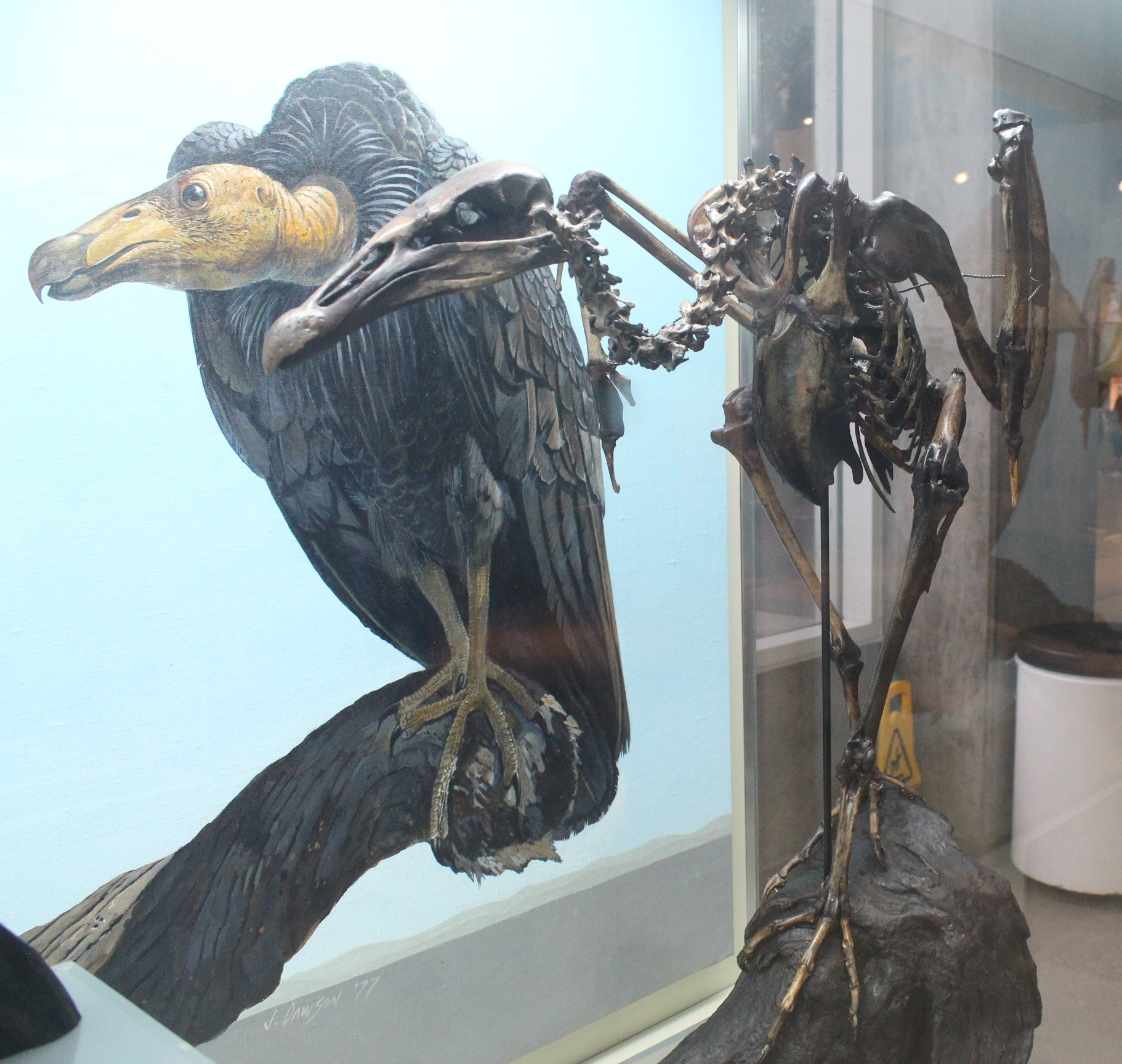
- Fossil

Scientific classification
- Kingdom: Animalia
- Phylum: Chordata
- Class: Aves
- Order: Accipitriformes
- Family: Cathartidae
- Genus: †Breagyps; Miller, 1938
- Species: †B. clarki

Binomial name
- †Breagyps clarki Miller, 1938

= Breagyps =

Extinct genus of birds

Breagyps is an extinct genus of New World vulture in the family Cathartidae. The genus takes its name from the La Brea Tar Pits in California, where its remains have been recovered. Breagyps clarki is one of three vulture species represented by fossil material from the tar pits, including the extant Turkey vulture.
