= Trochlea =

Anatomical term for a grooved structure

Trochlea (Latin for pulley) is a term in anatomy. It refers to a grooved structure reminiscent of a pulley's wheel.

== Related to joints ==
Most commonly, trochleae bear the articular surface of saddle and other joints:

- Trochlea of humerus (part of the elbow hinge joint with the ulna)
- Trochlea of femur (forming the knee hinge joint with the patella)
- The trochlea tali in the superior surface of the body of talus (part of the ankle hinge joint with the tibia)
- Trochlear process of the calcaneus
- In quadrupeds, the trochlea of the radial bone
- The "knuckles" of the tarsometatarsus which articulate with the proximal phalanges in a bird's foot

== Related to muscles ==
It also can refer to structures which serve as a guide for muscles:

- Trochlea of superior oblique (see also superior oblique muscle), a mover of the eye which is supplied by the trochlear nerve, or fourth cranial nerve

== See also ==
- The dictionary definition of trochlea at Wiktionary
