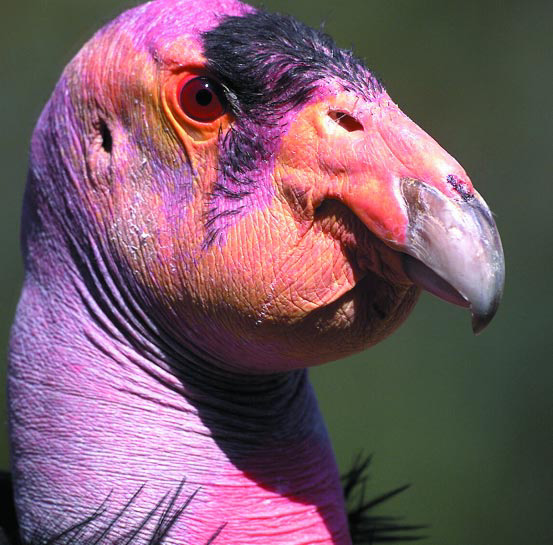
- California condor

Scientific classification
- Kingdom: Animalia
- Phylum: Chordata
- Class: Aves
- Clade: Accipitrimorphae
- Order: Cathartiformes; Coues, 1884

Subtaxa
- †Diatropornis; †Parasarcoramphus; †Teratornithidae; Cathartidae

= Cathartiformes =

Cathartiformes Temporal range: Eocene to present

Order of birds

Turkey vultures coming in to the same roost they use for the season.

Cathartiformes /kəˈθɑːrtɪfɔːrmiːz/ is an order of birds comprising the New World vultures and the now-extinct Teratornithidae. Unlike many Old World vultures, the living Cathartiformes are primarily scavengers and have feet poorly adapted for grasping prey. They were previously included within the Accipitriformes by some authorities, but Cathartiformes has gradually gained wider recognition as a separate order.

== Description ==
=== Anatomy ===
Cathartiformes possess unique adaptations in their plumulaceous feathers that prevent the accumulation of bacteria and fungal spores, allowing them to feed on carrion without falling sick. These feather adaptations include a lack of aftershaft, a flattened shape, and a porous structure that allows air to flow through, preventing the retention of moisture and bacteria. Their feathers lack the interlocking hooks found in other birds' feathers, making them more flexible and allowing for a greater degree of movement. This flexibility may aid in their ability to maintain body temperature while soaring at high altitudes and navigating turbulent air currents. Additionally, the presence of feather pulp and melanin pigment in these feathers may contribute to their durability and resistance to wear and tear.

Additionally, New World vultures have a highly acidic digestive system that allows them to break down and destroy harmful pathogens in their food, such as those from decomposing carcasses.

=== Diet ===
Vultures primarily feed on carrion. Most New World vultures are obligate scavengers, meaning they feed exclusively on animals that are already deceased. Their diet primarily consists of reptiles, mammals, birds, and fish, although they have been known to consume human remains as well. Their nature as detrivores plays an important role in the ecosystem by facilitating the removal of carcasses.

Young vultures of the order Cathartiformes rely on their parents for food. Adult Cathartiformes do not have feet adapted for carrying food, so they feed their chicks by regurgitating meat and bone fragments.

=== Eyesight and hearing ===
Vultures possess highly developed eyesight, capable of detecting a carcass measuring approximately 3 feet (0.9 m) in length from a distance of 4 miles (6.4 km), even at altitudes of up to 9,800 feet (1.86 mi). Their hearing is similarly acute, with a range of around 5,000 Hz and a threshold of 20 dB.

== Systematic ==
In the past, they were considered to be a sister group to the storks of the order Ciconiiformes based on DNA–DNA hybridization and morphology.

In Hackett et al. (2008), the clade uniting New World vultures with other accipitriform birds received relatively weak support. Citing both this uncertainty and the evolutionary distinctiveness of the group, the SACC recognized Cathartiformes as a separate order in 2008, whereas other authorities included Cathartidae within Accipitriformes. Later phylogenomic studies strongly supported the sister-group relationship between Cathartidae and Accipitriformes, while also revealing their deep evolutionary divergence. Recognition of Cathartiformes as a separate order subsequently became more widespread.

=== Species ===
The seven extant species of Cathartiformes fall into two primary clades. The first consists of the black vulture, the turkey vulture, and the lesser and greater yellow-headed vulture species, while the second consists of the California condor, the Andean condor, and the king vulture.
