= Kuntur =

Kuntur Temporal range: Tortonian

Scientific classification
- Kingdom: Animalia
- Phylum: Chordata
- Class: Aves
- Order: Accipitriformes
- Family: Cathartidae
- Genus: †Kuntur
- Species: †K. cardenasi

Binomial name
- †Kuntur cardenasi Stucchi et al., 2015

Extinct genus of cathartid bird

Kuntur is an extinct monotypic genus of cathartid bird that lived in South America during the Tortonian stage of the Miocene epoch.

Kuntur, the generic name, derives from the Quechua word for condor. The specific epithet refers to Santiago de Cárdenas, the first Peruvian naturalist to study condors.
