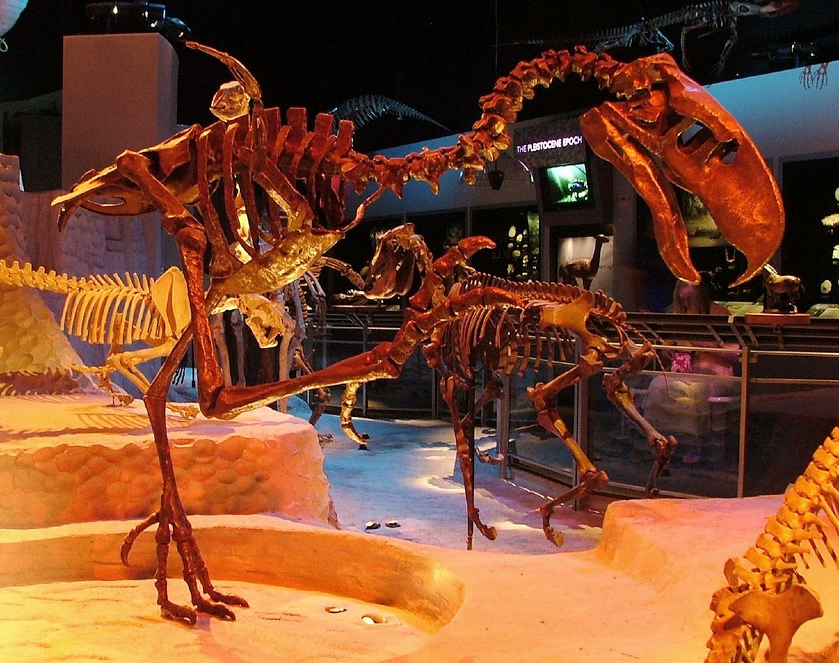
- Reconstructed Titanis skeleton, Florida Museum of Natural History

Scientific classification
- Kingdom: Animalia
- Phylum: Chordata
- Class: Aves
- Order: Cariamiformes
- Family: †Phorusrhacidae
- Subfamily: †Phorusrhacinae
- Genus: †Titanis; Brodkorb, 1963

Type species
- †Titanis walleri Brodkorb, 1963

= Titanis =

Titanis Temporal range: Early Pliocene-Early Pleistocene (Hemphillian-Blancan) ~5–1.8 Ma

Extinct genus of birds

Titanis (meaning "Titan" for the Titans of Greek mythology) is a genus of phorusrhacid ("terror birds", a group originating in South America), an extinct family of large, predatory birds, in the order Cariamiformes that inhabited the United States from the early Pliocene to early Pleistocene. The first fossils were unearthed by amateur paleontologists/archaeologists Benjamin Waller and Robert Allen from the Santa Fe River in Florida and were named Titanis walleri by ornithologist Pierce Brodkorb in 1963, the species name honoring Waller. The holotype material is fragmentary, consisting of only an incomplete right tarsometatarsus (lower leg bone) and phalanx (toe bone), but comes from one of the largest phorusrhacid individuals known. In the years following the description, many more isolated elements have been unearthed from sites from other areas of Florida, Texas, and California. The species was classified in the subfamily Phorusrhacinae, which includes some of the last and largest phorusrhacids like Devincenzia and Kelenken.

Like all phorusrhacids, Titanis had elongated hind limbs, a thin pelvis, proportionally small wings, and a large skull with a hooked beak. It was one of the largest phorusrhacids, possibly similar in size to Phorusrhacos based on preserved material. More recent estimates placed Titanis at 1.4 to 2 meters (4.6 to 6.6 ft) in height and over 300 kilograms (660 lb) in body mass. Due to the fragmentary fossils, the anatomy is poorly known, but several distinct characters on the tarsometatarsus have been observed. The skull is estimated to have been between 36 centimeters (14 in) and 56 centimeters (22 in) in length, one of the largest known from any bird.

Phorusrhacids are thought to have been ground predators or scavengers, and have often been considered apex predators that dominated Cenozoic South America in the absence of placental mammalian predators, though they did co-exist with some large, carnivorous borhyaenid mammals. Titanis co-existed with many placental predators in North America and was likely one of several apex predators in its ecosystem. The tarsometatarsus was long and slender, like that of its relative Kelenken, which has been suggested to have been agile and capable of running at high speeds. Titanis is known from the Pliocene deposits of Florida, southern California, and southeastern Texas, regions that had a mixture of forests and savanna and a menagerie of mammalian megafauna. It likely preyed on mammals such as the extinct armadillo relatives Holmesina and Glyptotherium, equids, tapirs, capybaras, and other Pliocene herbivores. Titanis is unique among phorusrhacids in that it is the only one known from North America, having evolved from phorusrhacids that island-hopped into North America millions of years before the Great American Interchange.

== Discovery and age ==
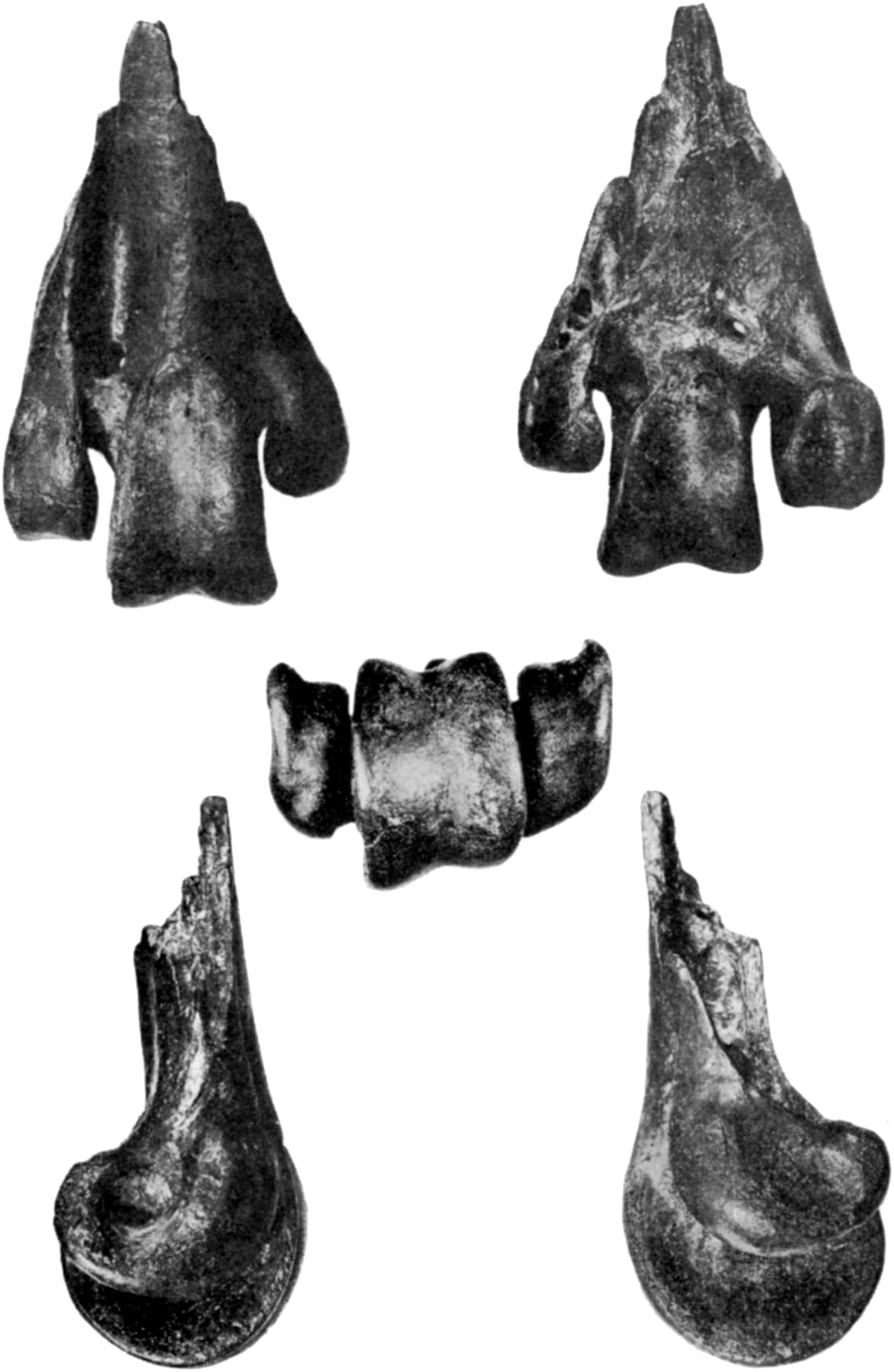
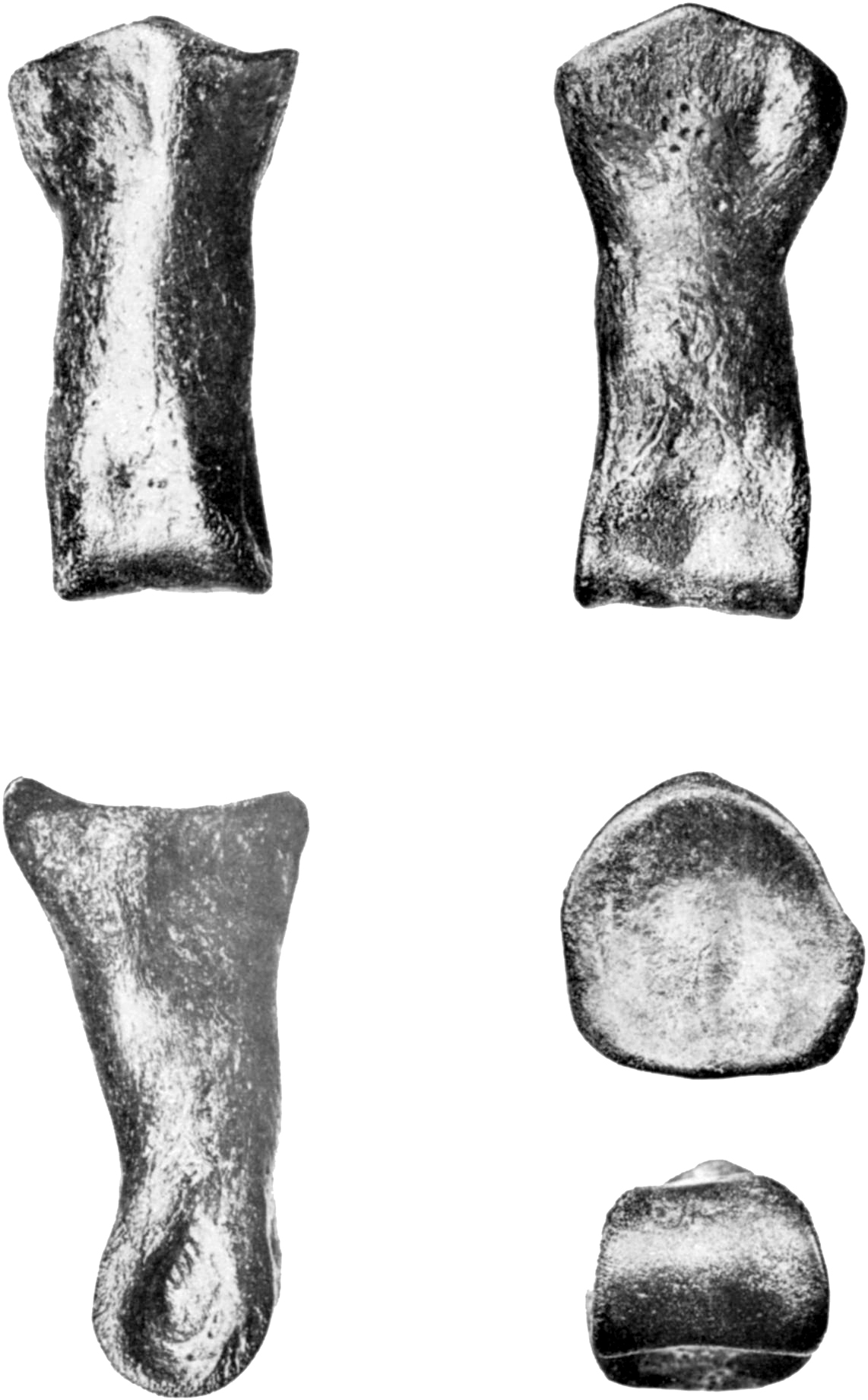
Holotype tarsometatarsus (UF 4108, left) in anterior and posterior views, and pedal phalanx (UF 4109) (right)

The earliest discovery of Titanis fossils occurred in the winter of 1961/1962, when amateur archaeologists Benjamin Waller and Robert Allen were searching for artifacts and fossils using scuba gear in the Santa Fe River on the border of Gilchrist and Columbia Counties in Florida, United States. The two collectors donated their discoveries to the Florida Museum of Natural History (UF) later along with bones of equids, proboscideans, and many other Floridan fossils from the late Pliocene and latest Pleistocene. Waller and Allen's avian fossils consisted of only a distal tarsometatarsus (lower leg bone) and a pedal phalanx (toe bone), deposited under specimen numbers UF 4108 and 4109 respectively. They remained without analysis in the museum's donations until they were recognized as unique by paleontologist Clayton Ray in 1962. He noticed the avian features and giant size of the fossils, which led him to believe they were from a phorusrhacid (or "terror bird", a group of large, predatory birds). Ray also noted their stratigraphic origin; they were found in a sedimentary layer containing the equid Nannippus and "bone-crushing" dog Borophagus, indicating that they originated from the upper part of the Blancan stage (2.2–1.8 million years old).

Ray presented the Santa Fe fossils to the museum's ornithologist Pierce Brodkorb, who mistakenly believed that they were from Rancholabrean strata, an error which made it to the final publication. In that publication, Brodkorb erroneously classified it as a relative of rheas, though Ray pushed Brodkorb to assign the fossils to Phorusrhacidae. Brodkorb published his description in 1963, naming the new genus and species Titanis walleri. The generic name, Titanis, references the Greek Titans, due to the bird's large size, and the specific name, walleri, honors Waller, one of the collectors of the type specimen. As suggested by Ray, Brodkorb grouped Titanis with the subfamily Phorusrhacinae within Phorusrhacidae, along with Phorusrhacos and Devincenzia. This was the first discovery of phorusrhacids outside South America.

Titanis has been found in five locales in Florida: Santa Fe River sites 1a and 1b and Inglis 1b, Citrus County; Port Charlotte, Charlotte County; and a shell pit in Sarasota County. Of the 40 Floridan specimens of Titanis, 27 have been unearthed from the Santa Fe River, many of them collected in the 1960s and '70s following Brodkorb's description. The Santa Fe River specimens come from two localities within the river, 1a and 1b. The former locality is more productive, producing elements of Titanis including vertebrae, limb bones, and even parts of the skull. Inglis 1b was originally a sinkhole during the Pliocene, but became a sedimentary layer of clay that was uncovered during construction of the Cross Florida Barge Canal by the federal government during the 1960s. A pair of graduate students from the University of Florida were the first to discover fossils in the clay sediments in 1967, sparking a wave of large-scale excavations by curator David Webb of the Florida Museum of Natural History. Work on the site lasted from 1967 to 1973, during which over 18,000 fossils were collected. Of the many fossils, only 12 belonged to Titanis, including cervical vertebrae, a carpometacarpus, and a metatarsal. As for Port Charlotte, a single fossil, a partial pedal phalanx from the fourth digit, was donated to the UF in 1990. Another partial tarsometatarsus was reportedly found in a shell pit in Sarasota County, making it the only other tarsometatarsus known from Titanis.

Fossil localities of Titanis
Legend: Early Pliocene-aged Early Pleistocene-aged

=== Texan and Californian discoveries ===
A newer discovery of Titanis was described in 1995; an isolated pedal phalanx that had been recovered from a sand and gravel pit near Odem along the Nueces River in San Patricio County, Texas. This was the first description of Titanis fossils from outside Florida. The pit was largely disorganized, with fossils dating to the Early Pliocene and Late Pleistocene jumbled together. The description followed Brodkorb's erroneous Late Pleistocene age assessment. Later analyses of rare-earth elements within the fossil demonstrated that the Texan Titanis derived from Pliocene rocks of the Hemphillian stage, a period preceding the formation of the Isthmus of Panama. This would make it the oldest estimate of a Titanis fossil at 5 million years old, compared to the Floridan fossils which are around 2.2–1.8 million years old, and therefore from the Blancan age.

In 1961, while fossil collecting, G. Davidson Woodward acquired several avian fossils from sediments in the Pliocene-aged (3.7 million year old) strata of the Olla Formation in Anza-Borrego Desert State Park, California, including a wing bone found in association with the premaxilla of a giant bird. The wing bone was referred to the teratorn Aiolornis at that time, an assessment backed by ornithologist Hildegarde Howard in 1972. This was supported by later studies, but a 2013 paper by paleontologist Robert Chandler and colleagues assigned the premaxilla to Titanis, the authors citing the bone's age and phorusrhacid features. The age of the Anza-Borrego premaxilla was estimated at 3.5-3 mya based off the original estimates from the paper describing the material. More detailed studies using magnetostratigraphy and tuff dating about the Olla Formation have indicated a middle-late Blancan age (4-2 mya) for the Olla Formation. The Hueso Formation and Olla Formation interfinger, showing the complex stratigraphy in Anza-Borrego.

== Classification ==
During the early Cenozoic, after the extinction of the non-avian dinosaurs, mammals underwent an evolutionary diversification, and some bird groups around the world developed a tendency towards gigantism; this included the Gastornithidae, the Dromornithidae, the Palaeognathae, and the Phorusrhacidae. Phorusrhacids are an extinct group within Cariamiformes, the only living members of which are the two species of seriemas in the family Cariamidae. Although phorusrhacids are the most taxon-rich group within Cariamiformes, their interrelationships are unclear due to the incompleteness of their remains. A lineage of related predatory birds, the bathornithids, occupied North America before the arrival of phorusrhacids, living from the Eocene to Miocene and filling a similar niche to cariamids.

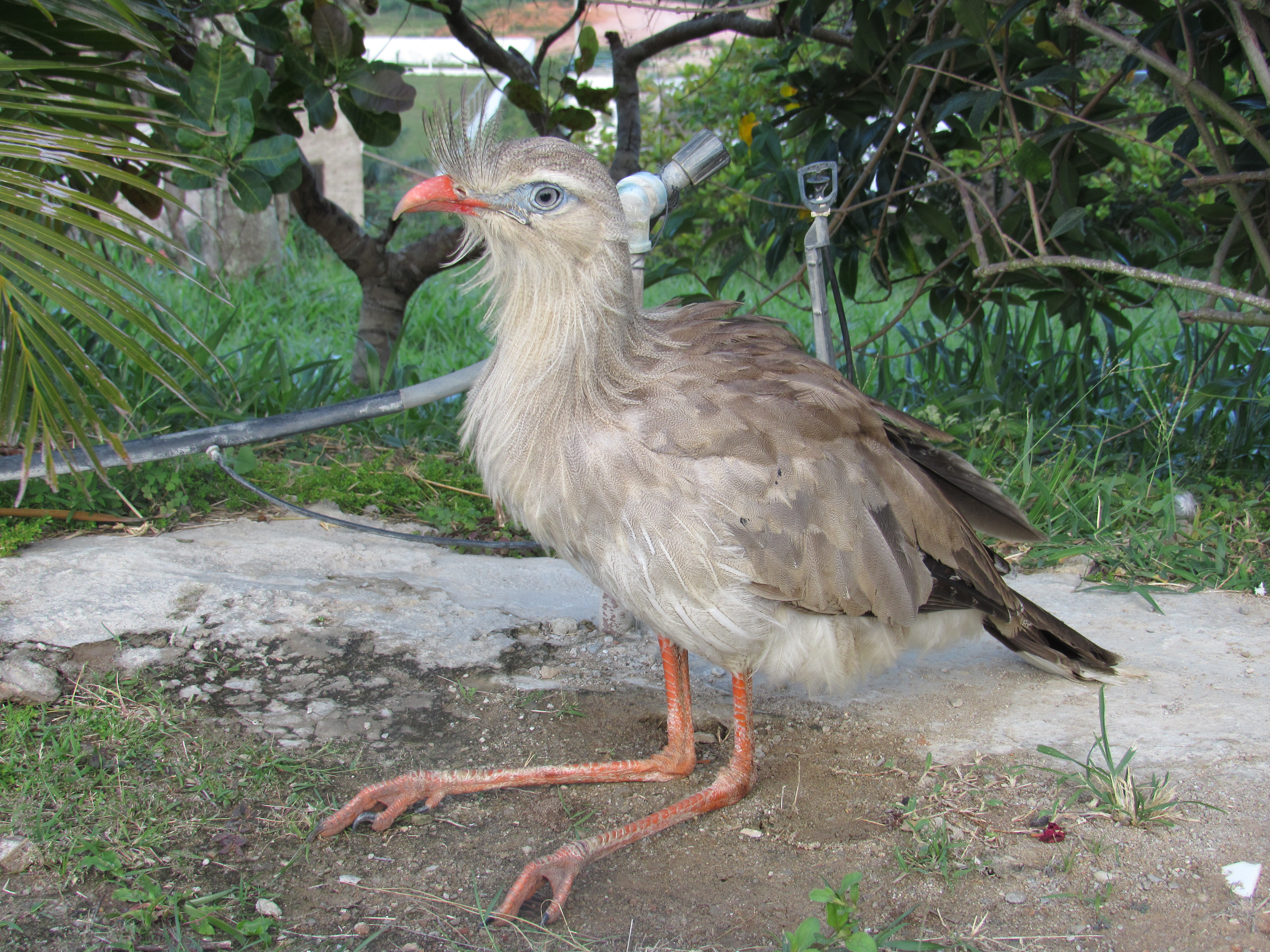
The red-legged seriema, one of the closest living relatives of phorusrhacids

The oldest phorusrhacid fossils come from South America during the Paleocene (when the continent was an isolated island) and survived until the Pleistocene, eventually spreading to North America through Titanis. Though fossils from Europe and Africa have been assigned to the group, their classification is disputed. It is unclear where the group originated; both cariamids and phorusrhacids may have arisen in South America, or arrived from elsewhere when southern continents were closer together or when sea levels were lower. Since phorusrhacids survived until the Pleistocene, they appear to have been more successful than the South American thylacosmilid predators (which disappeared in the Pliocene), and it is possible that they competed ecologically with placental predators that entered from North America in the Pleistocene. Titanis itself coexisted with a variety of placental mammalian predators, including carnivorans like the saber-toothed cat Smilodon, cheetah-like Miracinonyx, wolf-like Aenocyon, and the short-faced bear Arctodus. All of these genera, including the last phorusrhacids, went extinct during the Late Pleistocene extinctions.

Though for many decades the internal phylogenetics of Phorusrhacidae were uncertain and many taxa were named, they have received more analysis in the 21st century. Titanis, however, has consistently been regarded as being within the subfamily Phorusrhacinae along with Phorusrhacos, Kelenken, and Devincenzia. Brazilian paleontologist Herculano Alvarenga and colleagues published a phylogenetic analysis of Phorusrhacidae in 2011 that did not separate Brontornithinae, Phorusrhacinae, and Patagornithinae, resulting in Titanis in a polytomy (topology 1). In their 2015 description of Llallawavis, the Argentinian paleontologist Federico J. Degrange and colleagues performed a phylogenetic analysis of Phorusrhacidae, wherein they found Phorusrhacinae to be polyphyletic, or an unnatural grouping (topology 2).

Topology 1: Alvarenga et al. (2011) results

- Phorusrhacidae
  - Mesembriornithinae
  - - Psilopterinae
    - - Patagornis
      - Andrewsornis
      - Andalgalornis
      - Phorusrhacos
      - Titanis
      - - Devincenzia
        - Kelenken
      - Brontornis
      - Physornis
      - Paraphysornis

Topology 2: Degrange et al. (2015) results

- Phorusrhacidae
  - - Mesembriornithinae
    - Psilopterinae
  - - Kelenken guillermoi
    - - Devincenzia pozzi
      - - Titanis walleri
        - - - Phorusrhacos longissimus
            - Andalgalornis steulleti
            - Andrewsornis abbotti
            - Patagornis marshi
            - Physornis fortis
          - Paraphysornis brasiliensis

== Description ==
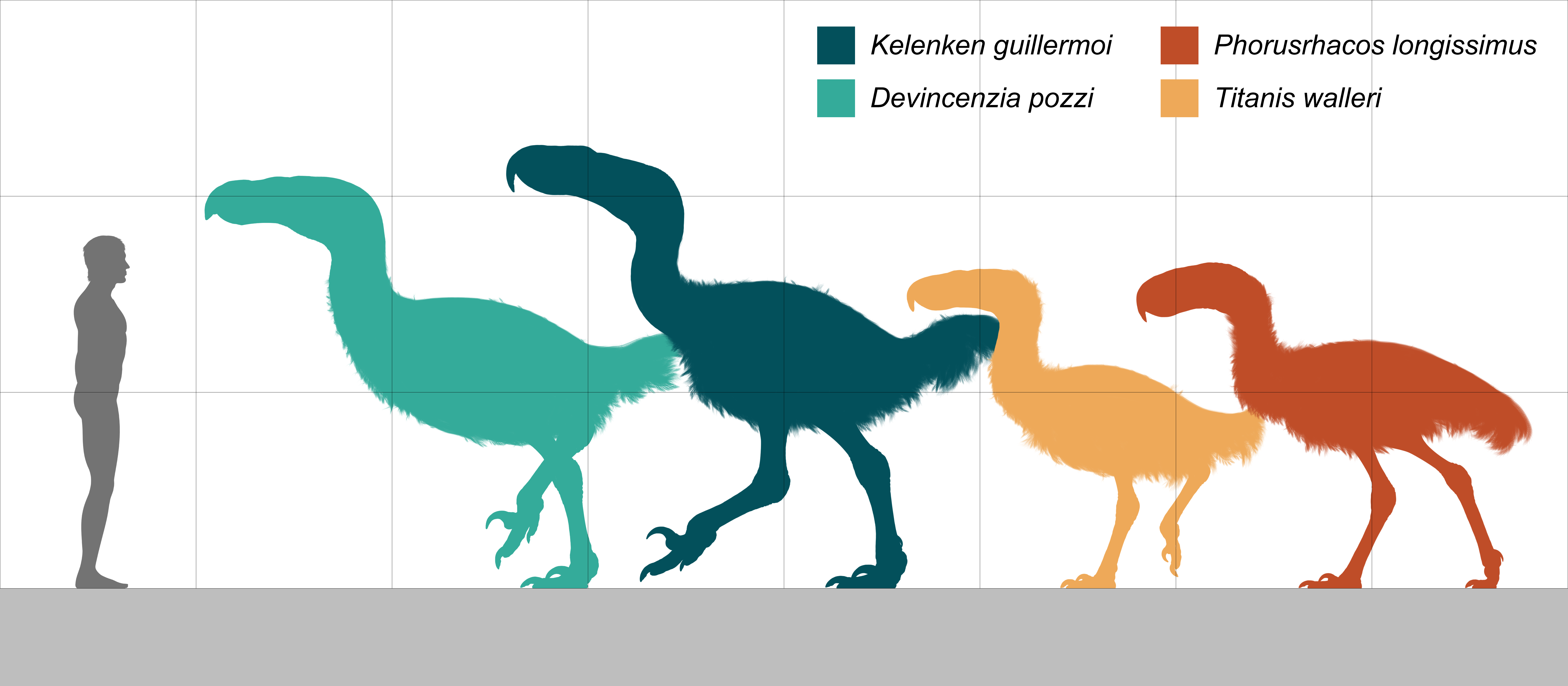
Size of Titanis (yellow) compared to other phorusrhacines

Phorusrhacids were large, flightless birds with long hind limbs, narrow pelvises, and proportionally small wings. They had elongated skulls ending in a thin, hooked beak. Overall, Titanis was very similar to the South American Phorusrhacos and Devincenzia, its closest relatives. Little is known of its body structure, but it seems to have been less wide-footed than Devincenzia, with a proportionally much stronger middle toe. In its initial description, Titanis has been suggested to be larger than the African ostrich and more than twice the size of South American rhea. Accurate scaling after the discovery of new material estimated its total height around 1.4 to 2 meters (4.6 to 6.6 ft) tall. Though Titanis was suggested to be comparable in size to Phorusrhacos based on comparing the dimensions of known specimens, researchers weren't able to definitively estimate the body mass of Titanis due to the fragmentary nature of the known specimens. In 1995, Jon A. Baskin proposed that a 2-meter (6.6 ft) tall individual would have weighed 150 kilograms (330 lb), but the 2005 study which cited Baskin suggested it to be over 300 kilograms (660 lb). This makes Titanis one of the largest phorusrhacids and birds known, only relatives like Devincenzia and Kelenken as well as some struthioniforms and gastornithiforms being larger.

=== Skull ===
Of the skull, only the premaxilla, frontal (top orbit bone), pterygoid (palate bone), quadrate (skull joint bone), orbital process, and two quadratojugals (cheek bones) have been mentioned in scientific literature. The skull is estimated to have been between 36 centimeters (14 in) and 56 centimeters (22 in) in length, one of the largest known from any bird. These sizes are based on the size of quadratojugals from Titanis and the cranium of Phorusrhacos. The premaxilla of Titanis is incomplete, consisting of its frontmost end including the characteristic long, sharp beak tip of Phorusrhacidae that would have been used for hunting. Its preserved length is 9 centimeters (3.5 in) with a height of 5.5 centimeters (2.2 in) with a triangular shape in vertical cross-section. Sides of the fossil are flat bearing a large dorsal crest, as in other thin-skulled phorusrhacids like Phorusrhacos. The culmen (upper arc) of the exposed premaxilla is identical to that in Patagornis marshi, an Argentine phorusrhacid. The pterygoid is enlarged, as seen in other phorusrhacids, at 10 centimeters (3.9 in) in complete length with a medially placed joint for its articulation to the basipterygoid process. Two quadratojugals are preserved, both with different anatomies. The larger of the two has a more pronounced crest cranial to the articulation tubercular, whereas the smaller quadratojugal has a deep fossa instead of a crest. Potential sexual dimorphism has been suggested due to the lack of signs of unfinished ontogenetic development in the smaller quadratojugal, meaning they both come from adults. In the lower jaw, a partial mandible is known but it is unfigured and undescribed in scientific literature. Being a phorusrhacine, it would have had a long and narrow symphysis ending in a sharp tip pointing downward.

=== Postcranial skeleton ===
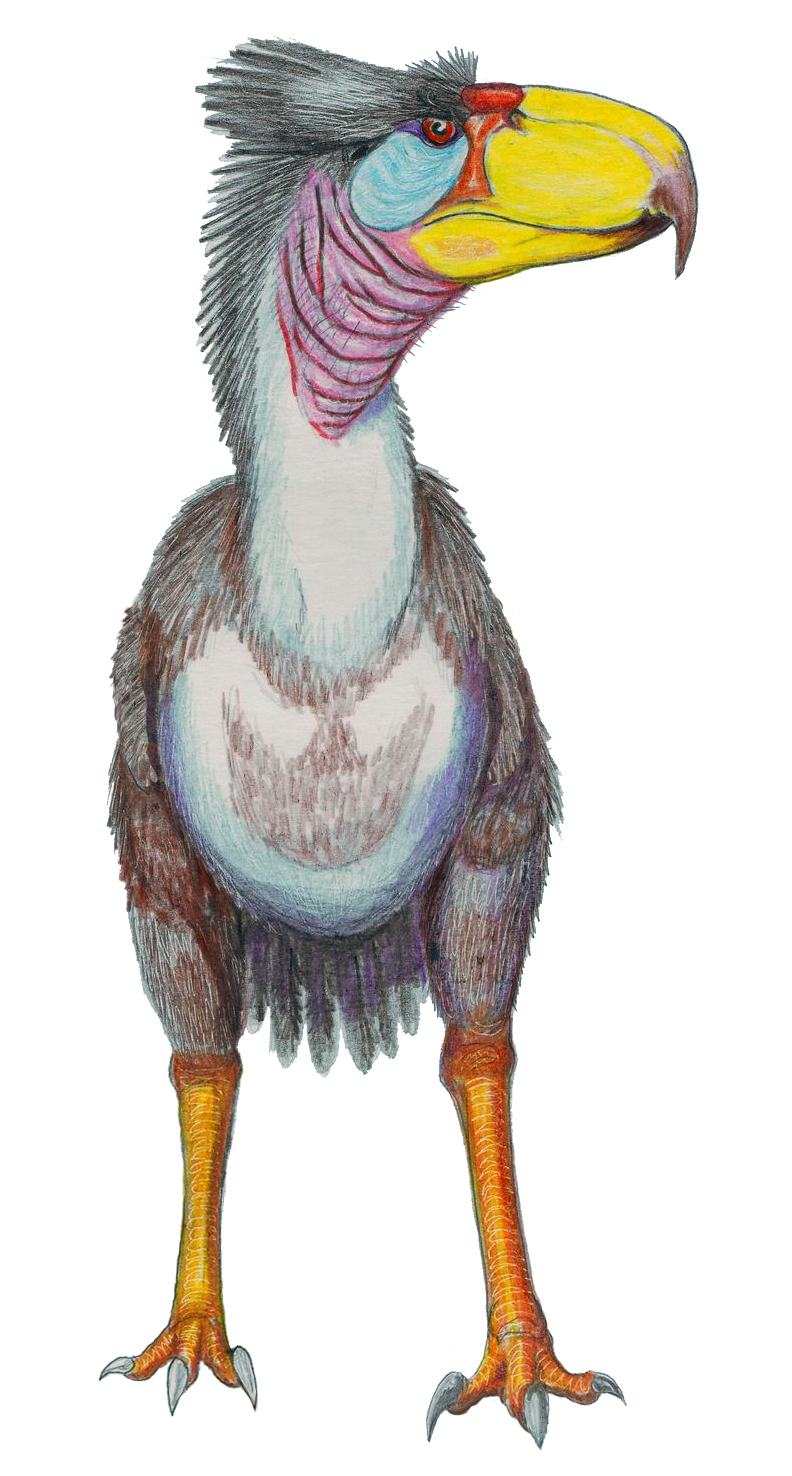
Life reconstruction

As for the postcranial anatomy, Titanis and other phorusrhacines were heavily built. They all preserve an elongated, thin tarsometatarsus that was at least 60% the length of the tibiotarsus. Titanis is distinguished from other phorusrhacines by the anatomy of its tarsometatarsus; the distal end of the mid-trochlea is spread out onto its sides. The pes is large and had three digits, the third of which had an enlarged ungual akin to that of dromaeosaurid dinosaurs. The spinal column is poorly known from Titanis, though several vertebrae have been collected. The cervical vertebrae are elongated anteroposteriorly and somewhat flexible, whereas the dorsal, sacral, and caudal vertebrae were more boxy and rigid. The dorsal vertebrae have tall neural spines atop the centra. The dorsal ribs connected to the sacral ribs, creating a basketed underbelly.

The wings are small and could not have been used for flight, but were much more strongly built than those of living ratites. It also had a relatively rigid wrist, which would not have allowed the hand to fold back against the arm to the same degree as other birds. This led R. M. Chandler to suggest in a 1994 paper that the wings may have supported some type of clawed, mobile hand similar to the hands of non-avian theropod dinosaurs, such as the dromaeosaurs. It was later pointed out by Gould and Quitmyer in a 2005 study that demonstrated that this wing joint is not unique and is present in seriemas, which do not have specialized grasping hands. The wing bones articulated in an unusual joint-like structure, suggesting the digits could flex to some degree. Evidence of elongated quill-feathers is known from Patagornis and Llallawavis, with large tubercles called quill knobs present on their ulnae. These quill knobs would have supported long flight feathers. The second toe bone or sickle claw of T. walleri was 8 centimetres (3.1 in) in length.

== Paleobiology ==
Little is known about the paleobiology of Titanis due to a scarcity of fossil remains. Many of its habits are inferred based on related taxa like Kelenken and Andalgalornis. Features such as the pointed premaxillary beak tip and recurved pedal unguals are direct evidence of its carnivorous lifestyle.

=== Feeding and diet ===
Phorusrhacids are thought to have been terrestrial predators or scavengers, and have often been considered apex predators that dominated Cenozoic South America in the absence of placental mammalian predators. They co-existed with some large, carnivorous borhyaenid mammals for much of their existence. Earlier hypotheses of phorusrhacid feeding ecology were mainly inferred from their large skulls with hooked beaks rather than through detailed hypotheses and biomechanical studies. Detailed analyses of their running and predatory adaptations were only conducted from the beginning of the 21st century through the use of computer technology.

Alvarenga and Elizabeth Höfling made some general remarks about phorusrhacid habits in a 2003 article. They were flightless, as evidenced by the proportional size of their wings and body mass, and the wing-size was more reduced in larger members of the group. These researchers pointed out that the narrowing of the pelvis, upper maxilla, and thorax could have been adaptations to enable the birds to search for and take smaller animals in tall plant growth or broken terrain. The large expansions above the eyes formed by the lacrimal bones (similar to what is seen in modern hawks) would have protected the eyes against the sun, and enabled keen eyesight, which indicates they hunted by sight in open, sunlit areas, and not shaded forests.

==== Leg function ====
In 2005, Rudemar Ernesto Blanco and Washington W. Jones examined the strength of the tibiotarsus (shin bone) of phorusrhacids to determine their speed, but conceded that such estimates can be unreliable even for extant animals. The tibiotarsal strength of Patagornis and an indeterminate large phorusrhacine suggested a speed of 14 m/s (50 km/h; 31 mph), and that of Mesembriornis suggested 27 m/s (97 km/h; 60 mph); the latter is greater than that of a modern ostrich, approaching that of a cheetah, 29 m/s (100 km/h; 65 mph). They found these estimates unlikely due to the large body size of these birds, and instead suggested the strength could have been used to break the long-bones of medium-sized mammals, the size for example of a saiga or Thomson's gazelle. This strength could be used for accessing the marrow inside the bones, or by using the legs as kicking weapons (like some modern ground birds do), consistent with the large, curved, and sideways compressed claws known in some phorusrhacids. They also suggested future studies could examine whether they could have used their beaks and claws against well-armored mammals such as armadillos and glyptodonts. In a 2006 news article, Luis Chiappe, an Argentine paleontologist, stated that Kelenken, a similar genus to Titanis, would have been as quick as a greyhound, and that while there were other large predators in South America at the time, they were limited in numbers and not as fast and agile as the phorusrhacids, and the many grazing mammals would have provided ample prey. Chiappe remarked that phorusrhacids crudely resembled earlier predatory dinosaurs like Tyrannosaurus, in having gigantic heads, very small forelimbs, and very long legs, and thereby similar carnivore adaptations.

==== Skull and neck function ====
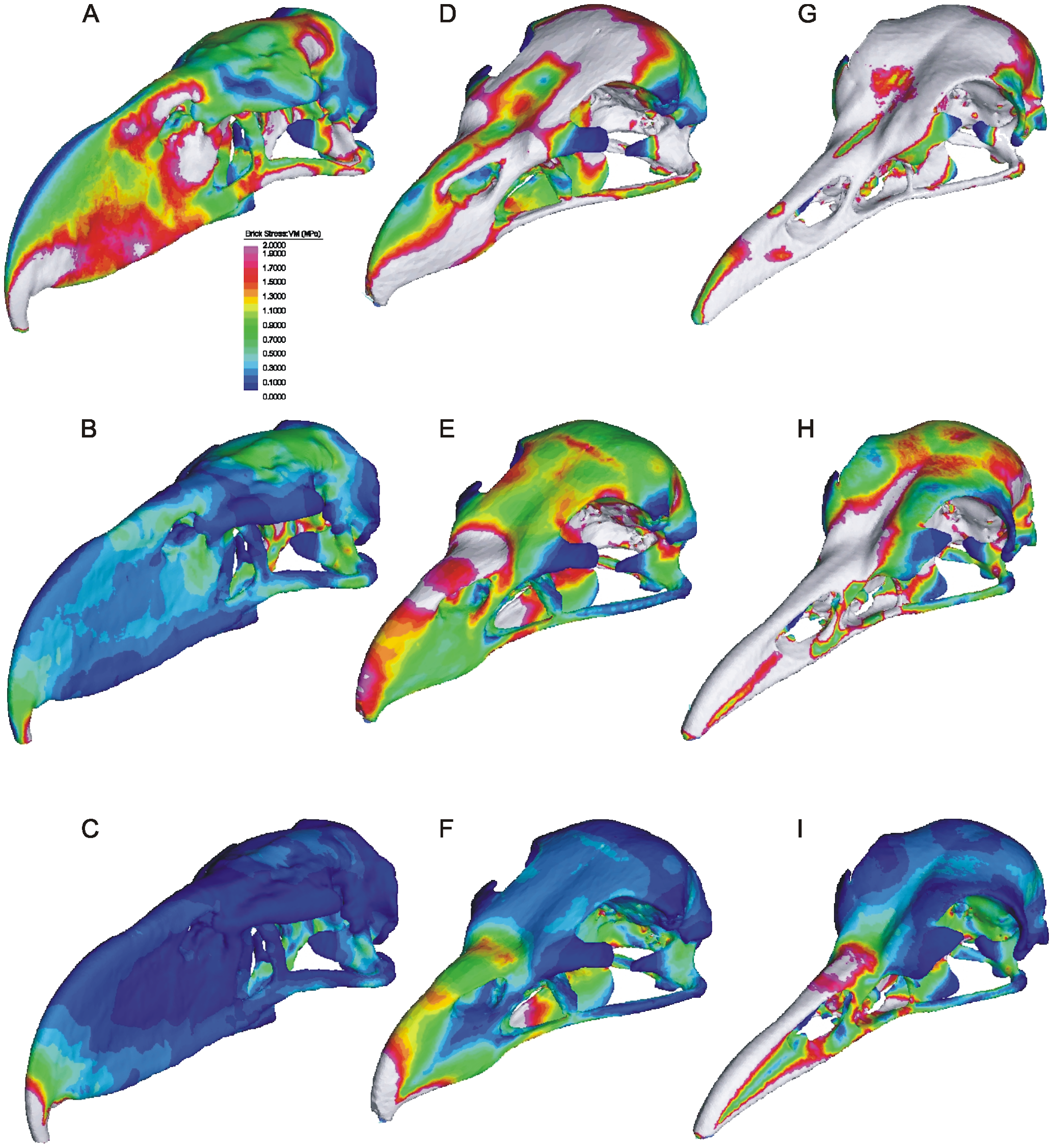
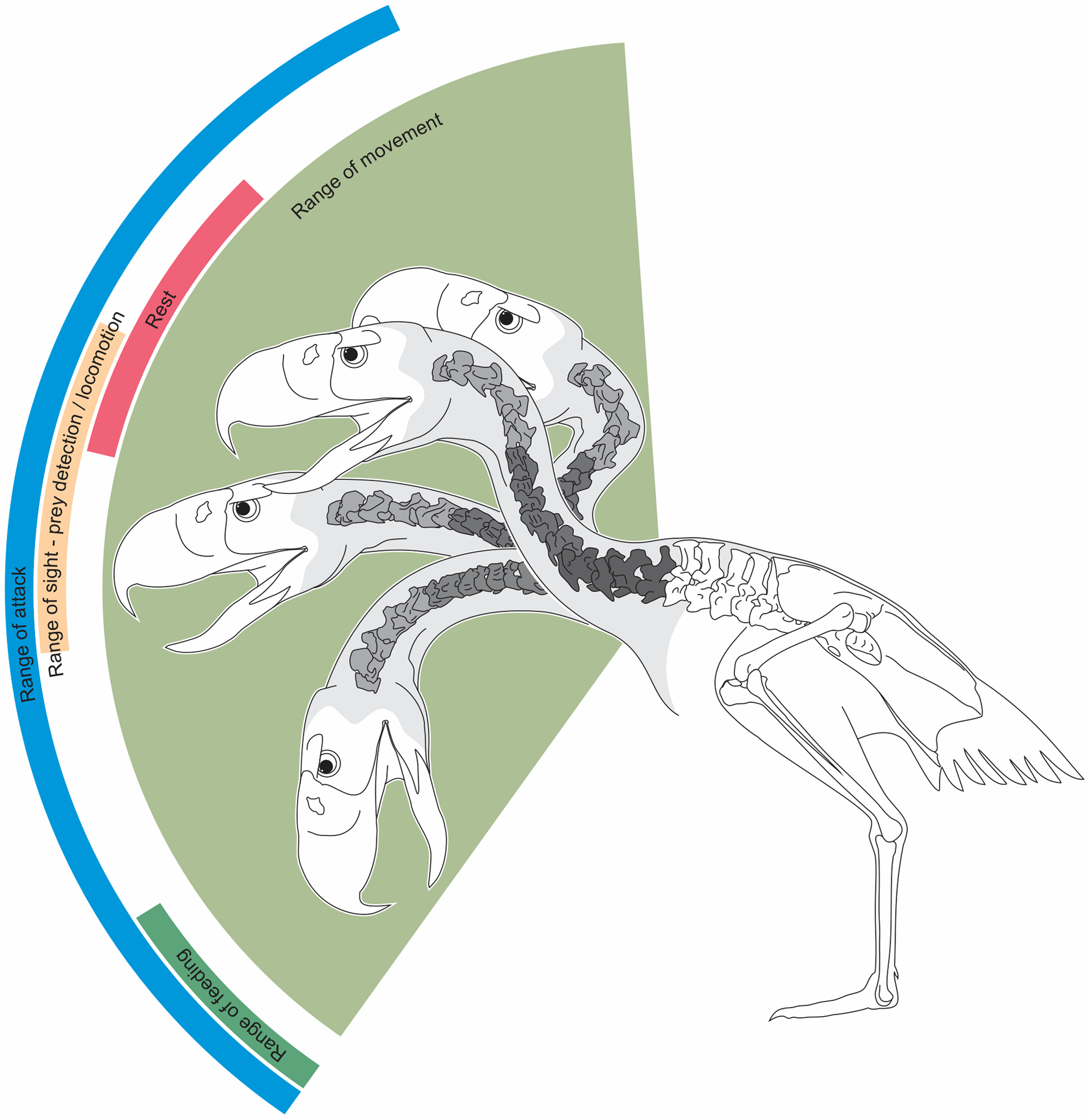
Stress distribution in bird skulls during various movements, including the related Andalgalornis (left, A-C, the other skulls belong to a red-legged seriema and a white-tailed eagle), and hypothetical up and downwards range of movement of the neck in the same genus (right)

A 2010 study by Degrange and colleagues of the medium-sized phorusrhacid Andalgalornis, based on finite element analysis using CT scans, estimated its bite force and stress distribution in its skull. They found its bite force to be 133 Newtons at the bill tip, and showed it had lost a large degree of intracranial immobility (mobility of skull bones in relation to each other), as was also the case for other large phorusrhacids such as Titanis. These researchers interpreted this loss as an adaptation for enhanced rigidity of the skull; compared to the modern red-legged seriema and white-tailed eagle, the skull of the phorusrhacid showed relatively high stress under sideways loadings, but low stress where force was applied up and down, and in simulations of "pullback" where the head returned to its normal position. A 2012 follow-up study by Claudia Tambussi and colleagues analyzed the flexibility of the neck of Andalgalornis based on the morphology of its neck vertebrae, finding the neck to be divided into three sections. By manually manipulating the vertebrae, they concluded that the neck musculature and skeleton of Andalgalornis were adapted to carrying a large head and for raising the head after the neck had been fully extended. The researchers assumed same would be true for other large, big-headed phorusrhacids. A 2012 thesis by Degrange found phorusrhacids to have had far greater bite forces than assumed previously, with the large-bodied taxa like Titanis having a bite force of 1,000~2,000N.

A 2020 study of phorusrhacid skull morphology by Degrange found that there were two main morphotypes within the group, derived from a seriema-like ancestor. These were the "Psilopterine Skull Type", which was plesiomorphic (more similar to the ancestral type), and the "Terror Bird Skull Type", which included Titanis and other large members, that was more specialized, with more rigid skulls. Despite the differences, studies have shown the two types handled prey similarly; the more rigid skulls and resulting larger bite force of the "Terror Bird" type would have been an adaptation to handling larger prey.

== Paleoenvironment ==
During the Blancan stage, Titanis lived alongside both endemic mammals as well as new immigrants from Asia and South America. Because of this, the fauna of the Blancan starkly contrasted with the fauna of the Pleistocene and Holocene. The localities in which Titanis is known are all tropical or subtropical in climate, with traditional interpretations indicating a habitat of dense forests and a variety of flora. In Inglis 1a specifically, previous studies have reported that longleaf pine flatwoods and pine-oak scrub are known to have occupied the area, similar to the modern flora. More recent interpretations suggest that the environment of Pliocene-Pleistocene Florida was a mosaic of different communities (i.e. a mixture of forests, savannas, wetlands, etc.), and that Titanis lived in areas of xeric thorn-scrubs and savannas. Similarly, the Santa Cruz Formation where Phorusrhacos was discovered also consisted of a variety of habitats, with Phorusrhacos suggested to live in open grasslands. During the Miocene-Pliocene climatic transition, the climate was cooler but temperatures did not reach those of the Pleistocene, creating a warm period. Sea levels were higher, but this was reversed at the end of the Pliocene during the beginning of large glaciations that fostered the Pleistocene's "Ice Age".

The Blancan age strata of Florida from Titanis sites preserve over a hundred species and many different mammals. This includes extinct proboscideans and perissodactyls represented by grazing equids and browsing tapirs. A wide array of artiodactyls existed, including peccaries, camelids, pronghorns, and the extant white-tailed deer. Armadillos and their relatives are also known such as a pampathere, a glyptodont, and dasypodids. One of the largest groups known from the Blancan of Florida is the ground sloths represented by three families. The carnivorans include borophagins, hyaenids, and "saber-toothed" cats. Large rodents are represented by capybaras and porcupines. Many fossils of smaller mammals like shrews, rabbits, and muskrats have been found associated with Titanis. Along with mammals, a menagerie of reptiles including lizards, turtles, and snakes is known from fossils. There are abundant remains of avifauna, with thousands of known fossils, including birds of prey, the teratorn Teratornis, one of the largest flight-capable birds known, and turkeys.

=== Great American Interchange ===
Examples of fauna that participated in the Great American Interchange, with South American migrants like Titanis in olive

South America, the continent where phorusrhacids originated, was isolated after the breakup of the landmass Gondwana at the end of the Mesozoic era. This period of separation from the rest of the Earth's continents led to an age of unique mammalian and avian evolution, with the dominance of phorusrhacids and sparassodonts as predators in contrast to the North American placental carnivores. The fauna of North America was composed of living groups like canids, felids, ursids, tapirids, antilocaprids, and equids populating the region alongside now extinct families like the gomphotheres, amphicyonids, and mammutids. Phorusrhacids evolved in South America to fill gaps in niches otherwise filled by placentals in other continents, such as that of apex predator. Flight-capable birds could more easily migrate between continents, creating a more homogenous avian fauna.

The Great American Interchange took place between the Paleogene and Pliocene, though most species crossed at around 2.7 million years ago. The momentous final stage witnessed the movement of glyptodonts, capybaras, pampatheres, and marsupials to North America via the Isthmus of Panama, which connected South America to the rest of the Americas, and a reverse migration of ungulates, proboscideans, felids, canids, and many other mammal groups to South America. The oldest fossil of Titanis is estimated to be 5 million years old, at least half a million years older than the earliest date for the Isthmus's formation about 4.5–3.5 million years ago. How Titanis was able to traverse the gap to North America is unknown. A hypothesis made by a 2006 article suggested that it could have island-hopped through Central America and the Caribbean islands. Titanis is possibly not the only large animal to have done this; two genera of large ground sloth made it to North America millions of years before the volcanic formation of Panama.

== Extinction ==
The extinction of Titanis and other phorusrhacids throughout the Americas was originally theorized to have been due to competition with large placental (canid, felid, and possibly ursid) carnivores that occupied the same ancient terrestrial ecosystems during the Great American Interchange. However, this has been contested as Titanis had competed successfully against both groups for several million years upon entering North America. In South America, phorusrhacids were already on the decline prior to the Great American Interchange, further doubting competitive replacement. Additionally, the hypothesis heavily relies on phorusrhacids having physiological and paleoecological attributes similar to island birds. Paleohistological analysis found that phorusrhacids had rapid, uninterrupted growth comparable to continental birds. Insular birds, on the other hand, had protracted growth which is associated to several stable, well-vegetated environments. This suggests strong continental conditions pressured rapid, uninterrupted growth patterns among phorusrhacids. Rapid uninterrupted growth would’ve also made them less vulnerable to competition and predation by invaders from North America. This suggests abiotic environmental factors rather than competition with carnivorans was the main cause of extinction for both Titanis and phorusrhacids as a whole.

Brodkorb's description of Titanis as being from the latest Pleistocene, an error followed by later studies, postulated that it went extinct as recently as 15,000 BP (about 13,000 BCE). The rare-earth element analysis of Titanis fossils by MacFadden and colleagues in 2007 dispelled this, demonstrating that the genus lived during the Pliocene and earliest Pleistocene. Titanis, and possibly Devincenzia, are among the last of the large terror birds. Certain small-bodied South American species outlived their larger counterparts and survived into the late Pleistocene, namely, Psilopterus and Eschatornis, with the latter estimated to have lived around 25,000 years ago, significantly closer to the time of human arrival.

== See also ==
- Gastornis
