= Oscaravis =

Oscaravis Temporal range: -Pleistocene

Scientific classification
- Kingdom: Animalia
- Phylum: Chordata
- Class: Aves
- Order: Accipitriformes
- Family: †Teratornithidae
- Genus: †Oscaravis; Suarez & Olson, 2009
- Species: †O. olsoni

Binomial name
- †Oscaravis olsoni (Arredondo & Arredondo, 2002)

Synonyms
- Teratornis olsoni Arredondo & Arredondo, 2002

Extinct genus of birds

Oscaravis is an extinct genus of large, predatory bird that inhabited what is now modern-day Cuba before going extinct at the end of the Pleistocene epoch. The sole species, Oscaravis olsoni (also known as the Cuban teratorn), was previously assigned to the genus Teratornis. However, it has recently been granted a new genus due to its ecological isolation from others in the teratorn family, as well as differences in size and possibly behavior. Although no exact measurements can be stated, due to recent archaeological findings and the comparison of Oscaravis bone lengths with that of other teratorns, it has been concluded Oscaravis would have been larger than Taubatornis but smaller than Cathartornis.

== Ecology ==
Oscaravis was most prominently located in modern-day Cuba, as well as the outlying islands at the time. Due to their massive size and wingspan, it was believed that many members of the family Teratornithidae, especially Oscaravis, could travel to neighboring islands and continents, resulting in the establishing of new niches as well as fostering the speciation of teratorns. Unlike many in the family Teratornithidae, it is believed that Oscaravis was a primarily a carnivorous predator as opposed to a scavenger. The large, stocky build and short legs of some of the larger members of the teratorn family, including Argentavis (the largest member of the teratorn family), pushed them to scavenging or simply waiting for prey to pass. However, the Cuban teratorn was believed to have survived on a diet of lizards, fish, and smaller birds, which it attacked using aerial assaults. Following the methodology of attacks, teratorns’ primary weapon was their large mouth, which it could use to swallow prey whole.

== Extinction ==
Oscaravis became extinct during the Late Pleistocene extinctions along with the majority of the North American megafauna. These megafauna were more susceptible to extinction due to their large size and the need for a greater amount of resources than smaller animals.

== New species ==
The extinct Teratornithidae family originally included only five genera. However, its isolation as well as recent comparisons between the Cuban teratorn and Teratornis merriami (among others in the teratorn family) have convinced scientists to erect a new genus, Oscaravis. The Cuban teratorn, previously named Teratornis olsoni, is the only species in this new genus. Analysis of incomplete skeletons of Cuban teratorns were done, comparing them to T. merriami, as well as some modern condors. The comparisons showed differences in the bones. The Cuban teratorn did not have features especially typical to any specific species of teratorn. In many cases, its bones were larger than T. merriami, supposedly its closest relative. Some of the differences in the fossil record suggest that some of the bones may have had slightly different functions. This clearly shows a differentiation in species. It seems that the Cuban teratorn, as the name suggests, was endemic to Cuba.
