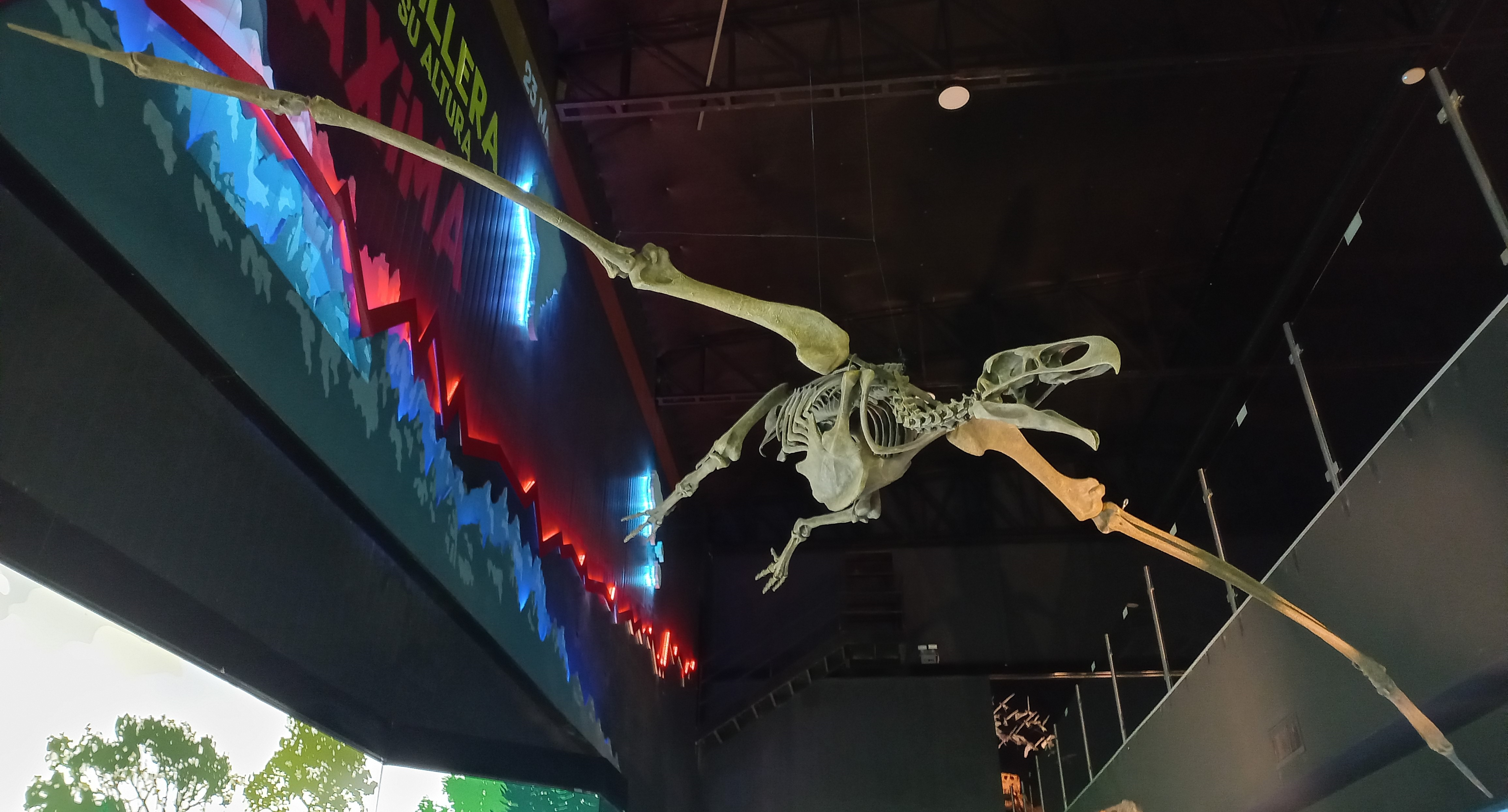
- Reconstructed skeleton in Museo Paleontológico Egidio Feruglio in Trelew, Argentina

Scientific classification
- Kingdom: Animalia
- Phylum: Chordata
- Class: Aves
- Order: Cathartiformes
- Family: †Teratornithidae
- Genus: †Argentavis; Campbell & Tonni 1980
- Species: †A. magnificens

Binomial name
- †Argentavis magnificens Campbell & Tonni 1980

= Argentavis =

Argentavis Temporal range: Late Miocene (Huayquerian) ~9.0–6.8 Ma

Extinct genus of very large birds

Argentavis is an extinct genus of teratornithid known from three sites in the Epecuén and Andalhualá Formations in central and northwestern Argentina dating to the Late Miocene (Huayquerian). The type and only known species, A. magnificens, is sometimes called the giant teratorn. Argentavis is among the largest flying birds known with a wingspan of around 5–6 m (16–20 ft), only surpassed by that of Pelagornis sandersi, though still remains the heaviest flying bird weighing up to 70–72 kg (154–159 lb).

== History of discovery ==
The first remains of Argentavis were found during an expedition by the Museo de La Plata, roughly 15 km south of Hidalgo station, at the Salinas Grandes de Hidalgo locality in the Huayquerian Epecuén (now Cerro Azul) Formation of La Pampa Province, Argentina, by Rosendo Pascual and Eduardo Tonni. This material consisted of an associated partial skeleton with portions of the skull, right quadrate and parts of the legs and arms. The material was then brought to the Museo de La Plata and housed under specimen number MLP 65-VII-29-49. It was cast at the Los Angeles County Museum.

Kenneth Campbell Jr. and Eduardo Tonni would go on to describe MLP 65-VII-29-49 in a 1980 paper and designated it as the holotype specimen of the new taxon Argentavis magnificens. The generic name Argentavis comes from the Latin argentum, meaning "silver", and avis, meaning "bird", and was used in reference to Argentina, the country where the remains of the animal were found. The specific name magnificens comes from the same word in Latin, meaning magnificent. They note that all the material has been severely fractured, although most of the material except for the skull was not severely crushed. This fracturing, among other sustained damages, meant that most of the postcranial skeleton lacked its diagnostic portions. However, the skull and quadrate provided strong enough evidence of Argentavis' relation to Teratornis, and permitted Campbell and Tonni to describe it as a teratornithid. This made it the third described genus in this family and the first from outside North America.

Campbell would go on to describe three additional specimens of Argentavis in a 1995 paper. All three were found during a survey of museum collections in Argentina in 1983. The first specimen, an uncatalogued ungual phalanx, was found in the collections of the Museo Municipal de Ciencias Naturales in Mar del Plata. The specimen was collected from the genus' type horizon, the Cerro Azul Formation of Argentina, in March of 1982 by Galilio Scaglia. However, it was found roughly 60km west of the type locality at a site near Carhué. The specimen was referred to Argentavis based on the development of the attachment site of the flexor muscle and a prominent groove running along the lateral and medial surface of the bone along with its size, being roughly 1.5x the size of the largest ungual phalanges of Teratornis merriami recovered from the La Brea Tar Pits. Marcos Cenizo and colleagues would revisit this element in 2012 and refer it to the family Phorusrhacidae instead, based on the fact that the provided characters were too poor to confirm an assignment to Argentavis. Cenizo and colleagues also mention a previously unreported proximal fragment of an ungual phalanx which was found associated with the holotype during further study. This element lacked both distinctive features of Campbell's 1995 element and possessed numerous others, confirming that it does not belong to A. magnificens.

The other specimens were found in the Andalhualá Formation of the Valle de Santa María, approximately 1200 km northwest of Argentavis' type locality. Two radioisotope dates were given for this formation in a 1979 publication by Marshall and colleagues, giving dates of 6.02 and 6.68 mya. This confirmed and refined the earlier Huayquerian (8-5 mya) estimate given by Campbell and Tonni in 1980. Both of these specimens are housed in the collections of the Paleontología Vertebrados Lillo in San Miguel de Tucumán. The first, a left coracoid (PVL 4600), was collected by G. Bossi in March of 1983. The second specimen, a tibiotarsus, was recovered by L. Peirano in October of 1939. These specimens were said to be smaller than the equivalent material in the holotype specimen and to have been in slightly better condition, although few new osteological characters could be differentiated.

== Classification ==
Argentavis is a member of the family Teratornithidae, a group of large birds of prey that inhabited the Americas from the Late Oligocene to the Late Pleistocene. The group currently numbers seven species across six genera. A. magnificens is the second-oldest of these taxa, surpassed only by Taubatornis campbelli. The fact that both of the oldest taxa in the group originate from South America suggests that the group as a whole also evolved here, only migrating to North America in the latter part of the Cenozoic.

Teratornithidae was included in a phylogenetic analysis that was published by Steven Emslie in 1988, reproduced below. The analysis was conducted using cranial characters of various taxa within the order Ciconiiformes, the storks, with a specific focus on Vulturidae (Cathartidae, New World vultures). This analysis included Teratornis merriami as a representative of Teratornithidae, and found the group to be just outside of Vulturidae. Based on the fact that this analysis found more shared characters distinguishing Vulturidae and Teratornithidae from other Ciconiiformes than ones specific to either group, indicating a close relation, Emslie suggested that Brodkorb's 1964 placement of teratornithids as a subfamily within Vulturidae might be more correct than retaining the familial rank, as Campbell and Tonni have done. Currently, Teratornithidae is still at the familial rank.

- Ciconiiformes
  - Ciconiidae
  - - Teratornithidae (including Argentavis)
    - Vulturidae
      - Cathartes
      - - Coragyps
        - - Sarcorhamphus
          - - - Breagyps
              - Vultur
            - - - Gymnogyps kofordi
                - Gymnogyps californianus

== Description ==
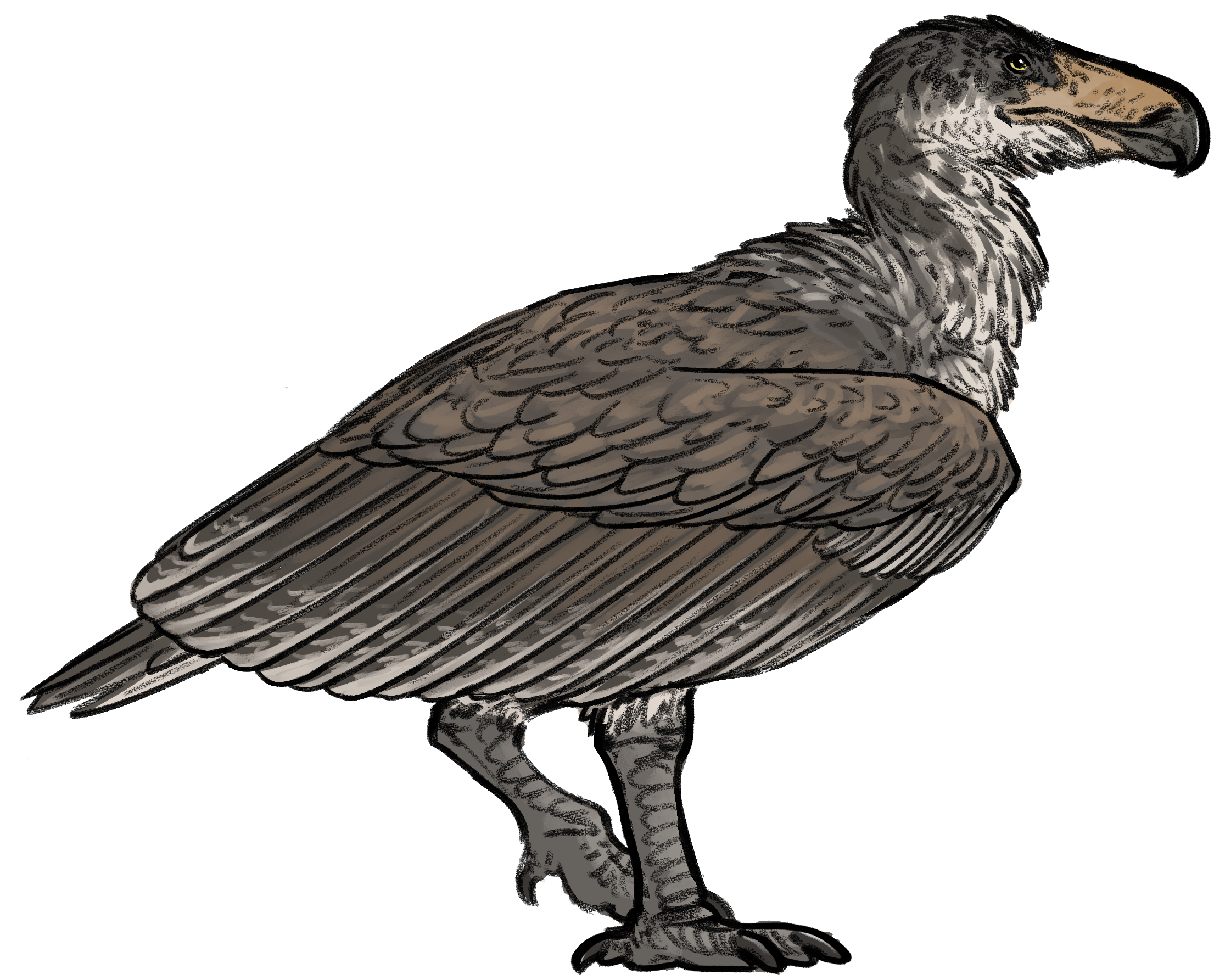
Life reconstruction of a grounded individual

The bones of the holotype of Argentavis are severely fractured, although crushing is minimal aside from the preserved skull elements. As noted by Campbell and Tonni in 1980, the postcranial elements all lack their most diagnostic portions, with the preserved portion of the ulna having no diagnostic characters at all. Because of this, only the partial skull and quadrate allowed the assignment to a (new) species. The partial ungual phalange later discovered on the holotype lacks a description.

Said quadrate has a number of key differences that allowed distinction from Teratornis. The quadratojugal socket is positioned farther back, and the surface for mandibular articulation extends more anterioventrally, but not as far forwards proportionally. The articulation with the anteromedial portion is also much larger proportionally, lying at a lesser angle when compared to the horizontal. The site of articulation for the squamosal bone is hemispheric, and the articulation of the pterygoid is positioned more laterally. The shaft of the coracoid is laterally compressed near the humerus, with the anterior-glenoid facet nearly flat. Medially to the glenoid facet, the shaft is convex. The glenoid facet itself is concave when viewed from the side, with the deepest point just lower than the midline. In posterior view its nearly vertical, and lined up with the coracoidal fenestra, which lies much closer to the procoracoid. The procoracoid is reduced, with the ventral ridge leading from it to the internal distal angle being small, but distinct.

Argentavis' humerus has a different curve to that of Teratornis, with the proximal two-thirds straighter, and the anterior third sharply curved dorsally. The humeral shaft also appears sigmoid (s-shaped) when looking at it from above. The deltoid crest features a pronounced knob, although its distal portion is not preserved. Although still curved, the shaft is slightly less convex between the deltoid and bicipital crests. The external tricipital groove appears to extend to the ectepicondylar prominence proximally, but the prominence has broken off from the fossil. The carpometacarpus has a deeper, more anterior tendinal groove on the second metacarpal and the posterior half of the shaft is more rounded with a small ridge on the posterior side. The distal metacarpal symphysis is closer to the center of the shaft, and the anterior end of the facet for the second digit extends further posterially and at a greater angle where preserved. The third metacarpal has a more triangular shaft, and its anterior surface is more excavated, with a pronounced ridge.

The tibiotarsus differs from that of Teratornis by being slightly curved when viewed from the front, although this might be due in part to breakage, and in having an underdeveloped fibular crest. The proximal end of the tendinal groove is more symmetrical, and closer to the center of the shaft, and the internal ligamental prominence is longer, more prominent, and lies proximally to the position observed in T. merriami.

=== Size ===
A comparison of Argentavis with (left to right) a human, a giant Miocene penguin, an emperor penguin, an elephant bird, an ostrich and an Andean condor. The estimated weight and wingspan of Argentavis as stated have since been reduced.

The initial description by Campbell and Tonni in 1980 tentatively estimated the wingspan of Argentavis between 6.5 to 7.5 m (21 ft 4 in to 24 ft 7 in) based on comparisons with Teratornis merriami. The 1983 study by the same authors estimated the wingspan of Argentavis by scaling up the dimensions of the California condor, with the highest estimate being 8.3 m (27 ft 3 in) and other estimates between 5.7 to 6.4 m (18 ft 8 in to 21 ft 0 in). In their supplementary material of the 2024 paper, Gayford and colleagues considered the 8.3 m (27 ft 3 in) estimate to be an outlier. In 2010, Mayr and Rubilar-Rogers estimated the wing skeleton length of Argentavis and Pelagornis chilensis at 1.83 m (6 ft 0 in) and 2.1 m (6 ft 11 in) respectively, with P. chilensis having an estimated wingspan of 5.2 to 6.1 m (17 ft 1 in to 20 ft 0 in), suggesting that Argentavis probably had a smaller wingspan unless it had much longer primary feathers. In his 2014 description of Pelagornis sandersi, Daniel Ksepka estimated the wingspan of P. sandersi at 6.06 to 7.38 m (19 ft 11 in to 24 ft 3 in), exceeding that of Argentavis which he estimated at 5.09 to 5.57 m (16 ft 8 in to 18 ft 3 in) and 5.70 to 6.07 m (18 ft 8 in to 19 ft 11 in) based on regression analyses and comparisons with the California condor respectively. For comparison, the living bird with the largest wingspan is the wandering albatross, reaching upwards of 3.5 m (11 ft 6 in).

The initial description by Campbell and Tonni in 1980 tentatively estimated the body mass of Argentavis at 120 kg (265 lb), while the 1983 paper by the same authors estimated its body mass at approximately 80 kg (176 lb). Subsequent studies have suggested a lower body mass estimate between 70 and 72 kg (154 and 159 lb). Argentavis still retains the title of the heaviest known flying bird by a considerable margin, with the aforementioned P. sandersi being estimated to have weighed no more than 21.9 to 40.1 kg (48 to 88 lb). Since A. magnificens is known to have lived in terrestrial environments, another good point of comparison is the Andean condor, the largest extant flighted land bird both in average wingspan and weight, with the former spanning up to 3.3 m (10 ft 10 in) with an average of around 2.82 m (9 ft 3 in), and the latter reaching a maximum of up to 15 kg (33 lb). New World vultures such as the condor are thought to be the closest living relatives to Argentavis and other teratorns. Average weights are much lower in both the wandering albatross and Andean condor than in Argentavis, at approximately 8.5 kg (19 lb) and 11.3 kg (25 lb), respectively.

As a rule of thumb, a wing loading of 25 kg/m^{2} is considered the limit for avian flight. A number of estimates related to wing loading have been produced for Argentavis, most notably the wing area, estimated at 8.11 m^{2} (87.3 ft^{2}), and the wing loading, estimated at 84.6 N/m^{2} (1.77 lb/ft^{2}), or about 8.64 kg/m^{2}. The heaviest extant flying birds are known to weigh up to a maximum of 21 kg (46 lb) (there are several contenders, among which are the European great bustard and the African kori bustard). An individual mute swan, which may have lost the power of flight due to extreme weight, was found to have weighed 23 kg (51 lb).

== Paleobiology ==
=== Life history ===
Comparison with extant birds suggests Argentavis laid one or two eggs with a mass of around 1 kg (2.2 lb) every two years. Climate considerations make it likely that the birds incubated during the winter, with members of a mated pair alternating between incubating and procuring food every few days. The young are thought to have been independent after some 16 months, but to not reach full maturity until they reached roughly twelve years of age. To maintain a viable population, no more than 2% of birds could have died each year. Because of its large size and ability to fly, Argentavis suffered hardly any predation, and mortality was mainly related to old age and disease in adults.

=== Flight ===
From the size and structure of its wings, it is inferred that A. magnificens flew mainly by soaring, using flapping flight only during short periods. This is further supported by skeletal evidence, which suggests that its breast muscles were not powerful enough to enable flapping of the wings for extended periods. Studies on condor flight indicate that Argentavis was fully capable of flight in normal conditions, as modern large soaring birds spend very little time flapping their wings regardless of environment.

Although its legs were strong enough to provide it with a running or jumping start, the wings were simply too long to flap effectively until the bird had gained some vertical distance, meaning that, especially for takeoff, Argentavis would have depended on the wind. Argentavis may have used mountain slopes and headwinds to take off, and probably could manage to do so even from gently sloped terrain with little effort. It may have flown and lived much like the modern Andean condor, scanning large areas of land for carrion. It is probable that it utilised thermal currents to stay aloft, and it has been estimated that the minimal velocity for A. magnificens is about 11 metres per second (36 ft/s) or 40 kilometres per hour (25 mph). The climate of the Andean foothills in Argentina during the late Miocene was warmer and drier than today, which would have further aided the bird in staying aloft atop thermal updrafts.

=== Predatory behavior ===
Argentavis' territories probably measured more than 500 square kilometres (190 sq mi), which the birds screened for food, possibly utilizing a north–south flying pattern to avoid being slowed by adverse winds. This species seems less aerodynamically suited for predation than its relatives and probably preferred to scavenge for carrion. Argentavis may have used its wings and size to intimidate metatherian mammals and small phorusrhacids to take over their kills. Phorusrhacids were the largest land predators in Miocene South America, and probably the biggest threats that Argentavis faced, with the largest species that coexisted with Argentavis, Devincenzia, weighing up to 350 kilograms (772 lb). Torres Etchegorry & Degrange (2024) suggested that Argentavis was a scavenger or even a kleptoparasitic bird, living in open areas without much vegetation, based on its probable brain morphology inferred from endocast reconstruction.
