= Inglis quarry =

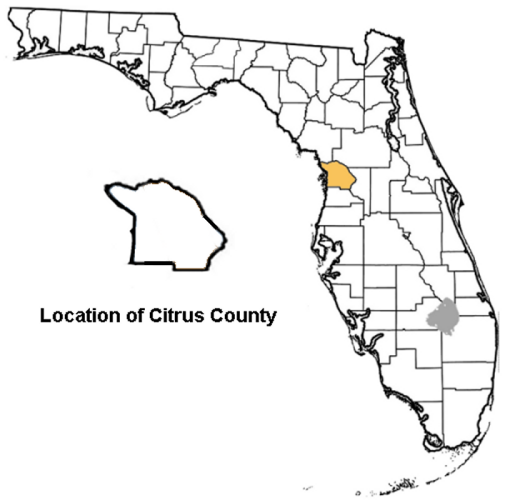
Citrus County, Florida location

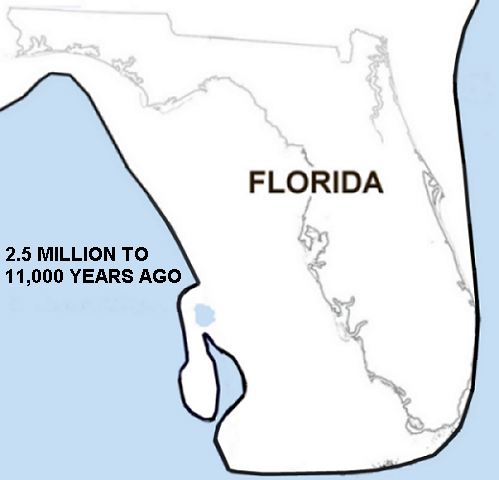
Florida during the Pleistocene

The Inglis quarry or Inglis quarry site is an assemblages of vertebrate fossils dating to the latest Blancan age,around 1.9-1.6 million years ago, located in the phosphate quarries near the town of Inglis, Citrus County, northern Florida.

Inglis site is located in limestone of the Inglis Formation dating to the Eocene to Early Oligocene of ~48–33.9 Mya. The inglis quarry itself is aberrant within this formation,being much younger than the Eocene rock its within.

Inglis site 1A was originally a sinkhole spanning 10 by 20 meters. From bottom to top, the sequence comprises a basal conglomerate, a thin clay bed, a lower sand unit, a second thin clay bed, an upper sand unit, and a cemented quartz sandstone. Its mammalian fauna is regarded as a close correlate of that from Curtis Ranch in Arizona, whose age is well established by magnetostratigraphy and radioisotopic geochronology.

== History ==
=== Site 1A ===
The site was discovered in 1967 during construction of the Cross Florida Barge Canal. In January 1974, staff from the Florida Museum of Natural History excavated and screened approximately 300 cubic meters of fossil bearing sediment from the sinkhole.

== Paleofauna ==
=== Mammals ===
Carnivorans of the Inglis quarry
Genus	Species	Notes
Canis	C. edwardii	A modestly sized canid.
Xenosmilus	X.hodsonae	A large homotherine.
Smilodon	S. gracilis	Smallest species of Smilodon.
Arctodus	A. pristinus	A tremarctine bear.
Chasmaporthetes	C.ossifragus	The only known North American hyena.
Theriodictis?	T?.floridanus	A large cerdocynid dog. However further studies have questioned this assignment.
Miracinonyx	M. inexpectatus	A felid related to the puma.

Xenarthrans of the Inglis quarry
Genus	Species	Notes
Glyptotherium	G.texanum	A large glyptodont.
Holmesina	H.floridanus	A large armadillo.
Megalonyx	M.leptostomus	A moderately large ground sloth.
Paramylodon	P.harlani	A large grazing ground sloth.
Eremotherium	E.eomigrans	A giant ground sloth.

Ungulates of the Inglis quarry
Genus	Species	Notes
Equus	E.leidyi	An enigmatic equine,large (130-160 cm at withers).
Hemiauchenia	H.gracilis	A llama.
Odocoileus	O. virginanus	A cervid.
Capromeryx	C.ariznonensis	An antilocaprid.
Platygonus	P.bicalcaratus	A peccary.
Tapirus	T.lundeliusi	A tapir.

Rodents of the Inglis quarry
Quarry	Species	Notes
Phugatherium	P. dichroplax	A large capybara.

Probiscideans of the Inglis Quarry
Genus	Species	Notes
Mammut	M.americanum	A large mastodon.

=== Birds ===
Birds of the Inglis quarry
Genus	Species	Notes
Titanis	T.walleri	A large Phorusrhacid. Features on the pterygoid are diagnostic of Phorusrhacidae thus explicitly confirming their presence in this quarry.

== See also ==
Other Citrus County sites:

- Crystal River Nuclear Plant
