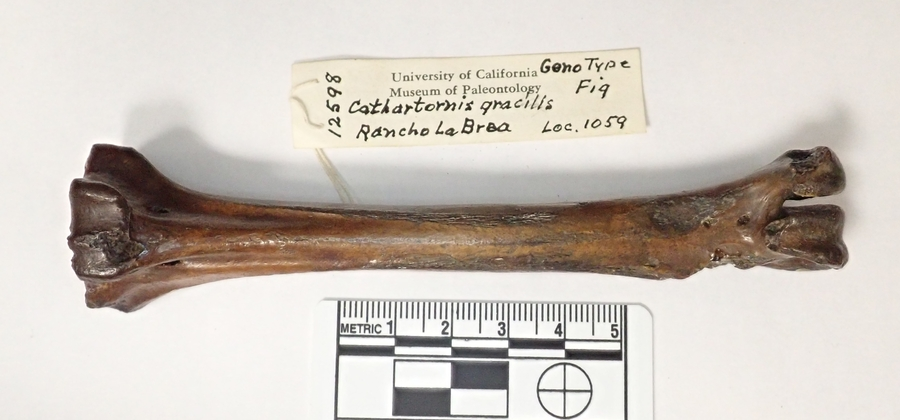

Scientific classification
- Kingdom: Animalia
- Phylum: Chordata
- Class: Aves
- Order: Accipitriformes
- Family: †Teratornithidae
- Genus: †Cathartornis; L. H. Miller, 1910
- Species: †C. gracilis

Binomial name
- †Cathartornis gracilis L. H. Miller, 1910

= Cathartornis =

Cathartornis Temporal range: Late Pleistocene

Extinct genus of birds

Cathartornis ("Cathartes Bird") is an extinct taxon of bird of the family Teratornithidae. The genus contains a single species, Cathartornis gracilis, known from only two tarsometatarsi, one complete and the other represented by its distal end. Both specimens were recovered from the Late Pleistocene deposits of the La Brea Tar Pits in Southern California. To date, no additional fossils have been referred to Cathartornis, although some remains currently assigned to Teratornis may represent the former. Unpublished fossil material has also been mentioned in connection with the genus.
