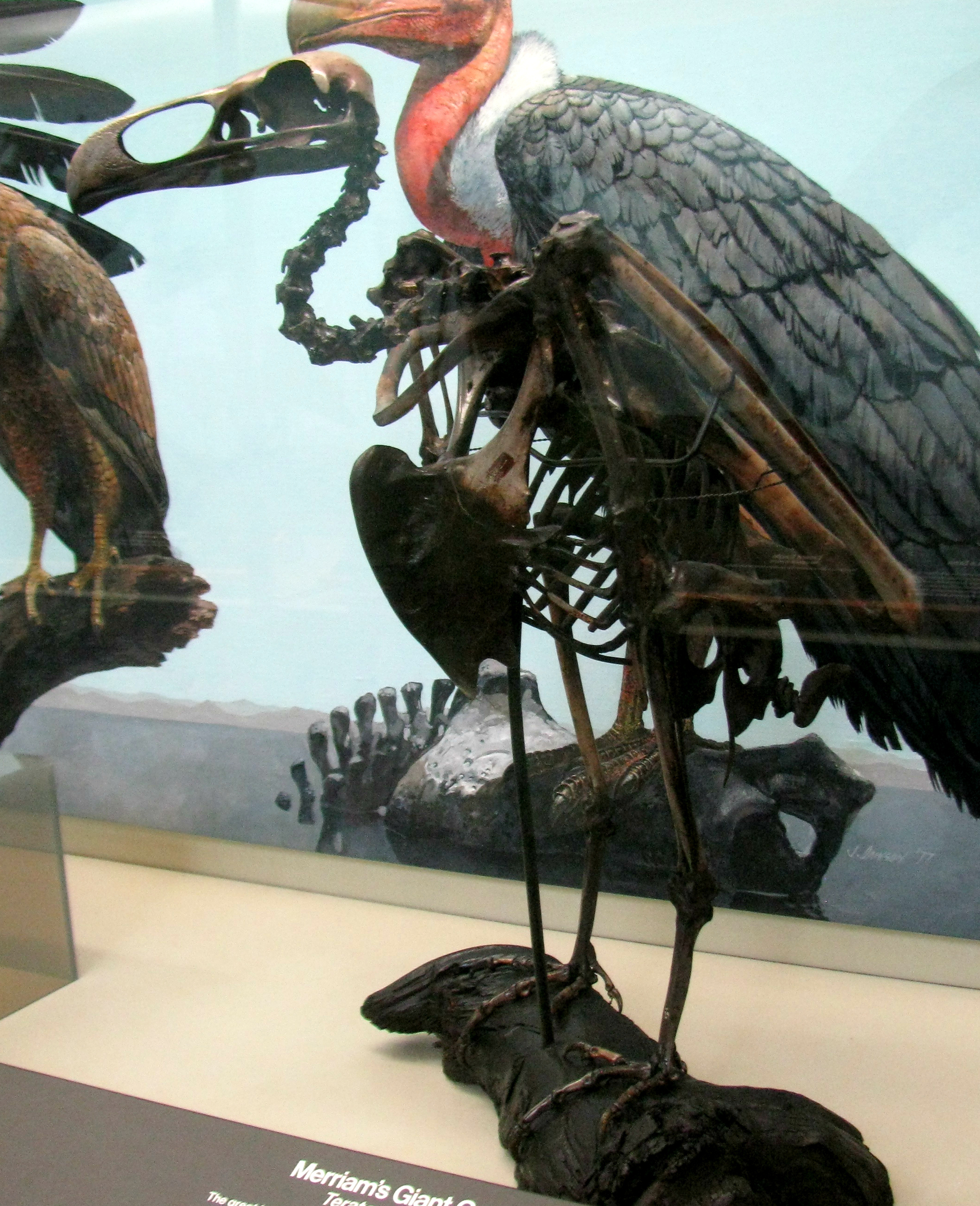
- Teratornis merriami skeleton from the La Brea Tar Pits

Scientific classification
- Kingdom: Animalia
- Phylum: Chordata
- Class: Aves
- Order: Cathartiformes
- Family: †Teratornithidae; L. H. Miller 1909

Genera
- †Aiolornis; †Argentavis; †Cathartornis; †Oscaravis; †Taubatornis; †Teratornis

= Teratornithidae =

Teratornithidae Temporal range: Late Oligocene-Late Pleistocene ~25–0.010 Ma

Extinct family of birds

Teratornithidae is an extinct family of very large birds of prey that lived in North and South America from the Late Oligocene to Late Pleistocene. They include some of the largest known flying birds. Its members are known as teratorns.

== Taxonomy ==
Teratornithidae are related to New World vultures (Cathartidae, syn. Vulturidae). The fact that both of the oldest taxa in the group, Taubatornis and Argentavis, originate from South America suggests that the group as a whole also evolved here, only migrating to North America in the latter part of the Cenozoic. So far, seven species in six genera have been identified:

- Teratornis
  - Teratornis merriami. This is by far the best-known species. Over a hundred specimens have been found, mostly from the La Brea Tar Pits. It stood about 75 centimetres (30 in) tall with an estimated wingspan of 3.5 to 3.8 metres (11 to 12 ft), and weighed about 15 kilograms (33 lb); making it about a third bigger than extant condors. It became extinct at the end of Pleistocene, some 10,000 years ago.
  - Teratornis woodburnensis. The first species to be found north of the La Brea Tar Pits, this partial specimen was discovered at Legion Park, Woodburn, Oregon. It is known from a humerus, parts of the cranium, beak, sternum, and vertebrae which indicate an estimated wingspan of over 4 metres (13 ft). The find dates to the Late Pleistocene, between 11,000 and 12,000 years ago, in a stratum which is filled with the bones of mastodons, sloths, and condors, and has evidence of human habitation.
- Aiolornis incredibilis, previously known as Teratornis incredibilis. This species is fairly poorly known; finds from Nevada and California include several wing bones and part of the beak. They show remarkable similarity with merriami but are uniformly about 40% larger: this would translate to a mass of up to 23 kilograms (51 lb) and a wingspan of about 5.5 metres (18 ft) for incredibilis. The finds are dated from the Pliocene to the late Pleistocene, which is a considerable chronological spread, and thus it is uncertain whether they actually represent the same species.
- Cathartornis gracilis. This species is known only from a couple of leg bones found from La Brea Ranch. Compared to T. merriami, remains are slightly shorter and clearly more slender, indicating a more gracile build.
- Argentavis magnificens. A partial skeleton of this enormous teratorn was found from La Pampa, Argentina. It is one of the largest flying birds known to have existed, only likely exceeded by measurement of wingspan by Pelagornis sandersi, discovered in 1983. Fossil remains of this species have been dated to the Huayquerian, about 9 to 6.8 million years ago, and it is one of the few teratorn finds in South America. The initial discovery included portions of the skull, an incomplete humerus and several other wing bones. Even conservative estimates put its wingspan at 6 metres (20 ft) and up, and it may have been as much as 8 metres (26 ft). The weight of the bird was estimated to have been around 80 kilograms (180 lb).
- Oscaravis olsoni was described from the Pleistocene of Cuba, but its affinities are not completely resolved; it might not be a teratorn at all. There are also undescribed fossils from southwestern Ecuador.
- Taubatornis campbelli is the earliest known teratorn species, from the Late Oligocene or Early Miocene of the Tremembé Formation, Taubaté Basin, Brazil.

=== Classification ===
Teratornithidae has only been included in a single phylogenetic analysis, published by Steven Emslie in 1988. The analysis was conducted using cranial characters of various taxa within the order Ciconiiformes, with a specific focus on Vulturidae (Cathartidae). This analysis included Teratornis merriami as a representative of Teratornithidae, and found the group to be just outside of Vulturidae.

- Ciconiiformes
  - Ciconiidae
  - - Teratornithidae
    - Vulturidae
      - Cathartes
      - - Coragyps
        - - Sarcorhamphus
          - - - Breagyps
              - Vultur
            - - - Gymnogyps kofordi
                - Gymnogyps californianus

== Description and ecology ==
Despite their size, there is little doubt that even the largest teratorns could fly. Visible marks of the attachments of contour feathers can be seen on Argentavis wing bones. This defies some earlier theories that extant condors, swans, and bustards represent the size limit for flying birds. The wing loading of Argentavis was relatively low for its size, a bit more than a turkey's, and if there were any significant wind present, the bird could probably get airborne merely by spreading its wings, just like modern albatrosses. South America during the Miocene probably featured strong and steady westerly winds, as the Andes were still forming and not yet very high.

T. merriami was small enough (relatively speaking) to take off with a simple jump and a few flaps. The fingerbones are mostly fused as in all birds, but the former index finger has partially evolved into a wide shelf at least in T. merriami, and as condors have a similar adaptation, probably in other species, too. Wing length estimates vary considerably but more likely than not were at the upper end of the range, because this bone structure bears the load of the massive primaries.

Studies on condor flight suggest that even the largest teratorns were capable of flight in normal conditions, as modern large soaring birds rarely flap their wings regardless of terrain.

Traditionally, teratorns have been described as large scavengers, very much like oversized condors, owing to considerable similarity with condors. However, the long beaks and wide gapes of teratorns are more like the beaks of eagles and other actively predatory birds than those of vultures. Most likely teratorns swallowed their prey whole; Argentavis could technically swallow up to hare-sized animals in a single piece. Although they undoubtedly engaged in opportunistic scavenging, they seem to have been active predators most of the time. The leg and pelvis morphology of teratorns suggest they are more capable and agile walkers than condors (although the legs of Teratornis merriami are shorter than that of the Andean condor); thus it seems possible that teratorns would stalk their prey on the ground (much like extant caracaras), and take off only to fly to another feeding ground or their nests; especially Cathartornis seems well-adapted for such a lifestyle. Argentavis may have been an exception, as its sheer bulk would have made it a less effective hunter, but better adapted to taking over other predators' kills. As teratorns were not habitual scavengers, they most likely had completely feathered heads, unlike vultures.

The skull features of teratorns still share a lot of crucial similarities with specialized scavenging raptors. Many old world vultures possess large bills similar to teratorns, and a longer bill is in fact an anatomic feature that points toward a scavenging rather than a predatory life style, as this allow them to probe deeper into large carcases - larger than those fed upon by active-hunting raptors. Other anatomical features, such as the relatively small and sideward facing orbits and the lower skull, are also consistent with a scavenging lifestyle. More sideward facing eyes allow scavenging raptors to have a wider field of vision, which is advantageous in spotting carcases. In contrast, predatory raptors usually have proportionally larger and more forward facing orbits, as depth perception is more important for a predatory lifestyle.

As in other large birds, a clutch probably had only one or two eggs; the young would be cared for more than half a year, and take several years to reach maturity, probably up to 12 years in Argentavis.
