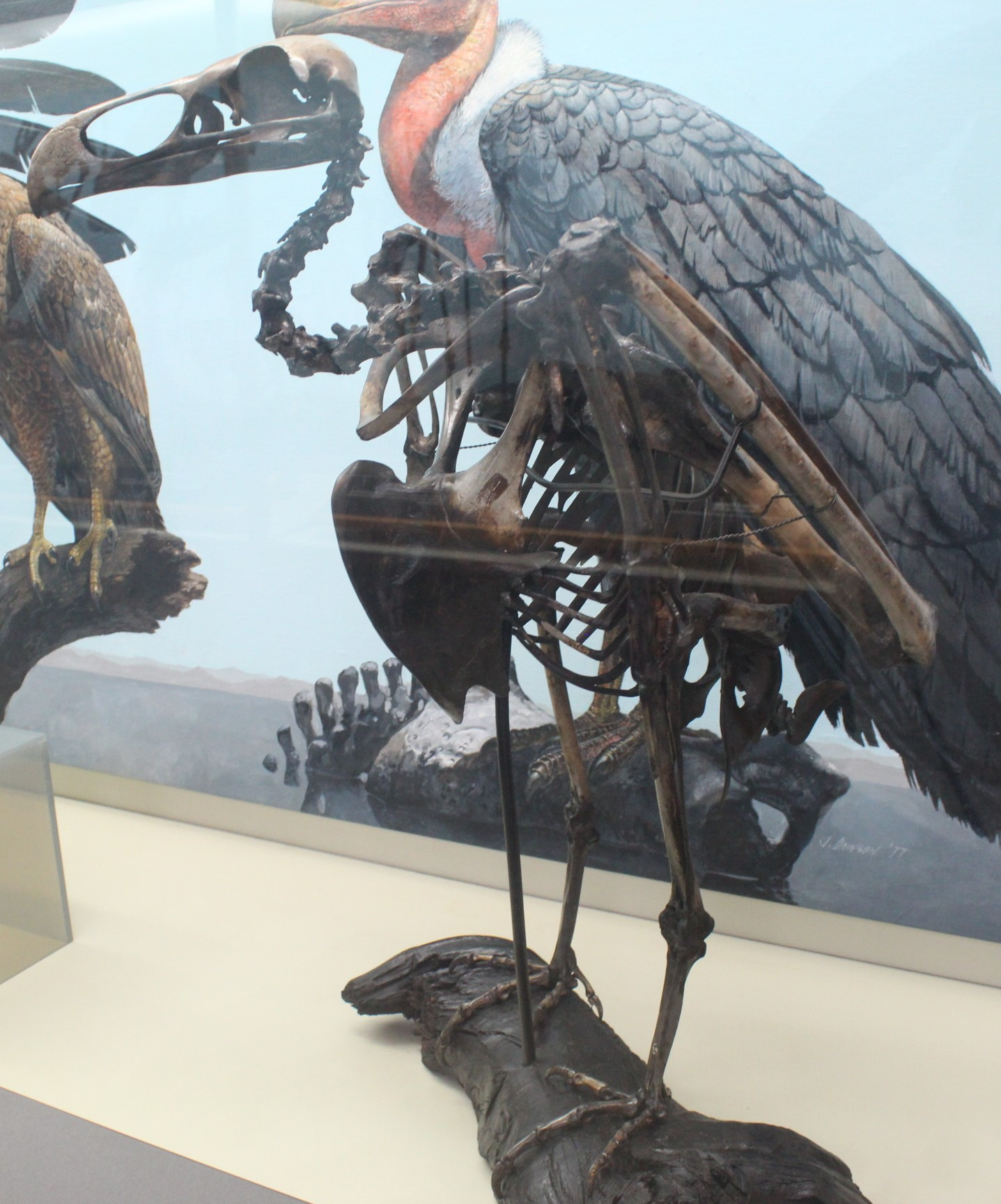
- T. merriami skeleton from the La Brea Tar Pits

Scientific classification
- Kingdom: Animalia
- Phylum: Chordata
- Class: Aves
- Order: Cathartiformes
- Family: †Teratornithidae
- Genus: †Teratornis; L. H. Miller, 1909

Type species
- Teratornis merriami Miller, 1909

Species
- T. merriami Miller, 1909; T. woodburnensis Campbell & Stenger, 2002

Synonyms
- Pleistogyps rex Milner, 1910

= Teratornis =

Teratornis Temporal range: Pleistocene

Extinct genus of birds

Teratornis is an extinct genus of huge North American birds of prey—the best-known of the teratorns—of which, two species are known to have existed: Teratornis merriami and Teratornis woodburnensis. A large number of fossil and subfossil bones, representing more than 100 individuals, have been found in locations in California, Oregon, southern Nevada, Arizona, and Florida, though most are from the Californian La Brea Tar Pits. All remains are known from the Late Pleistocene except one partial skeleton from the Early Pleistocene Leisey Shell Pit near Charlotte Harbor, Florida.

== Taxonomy ==
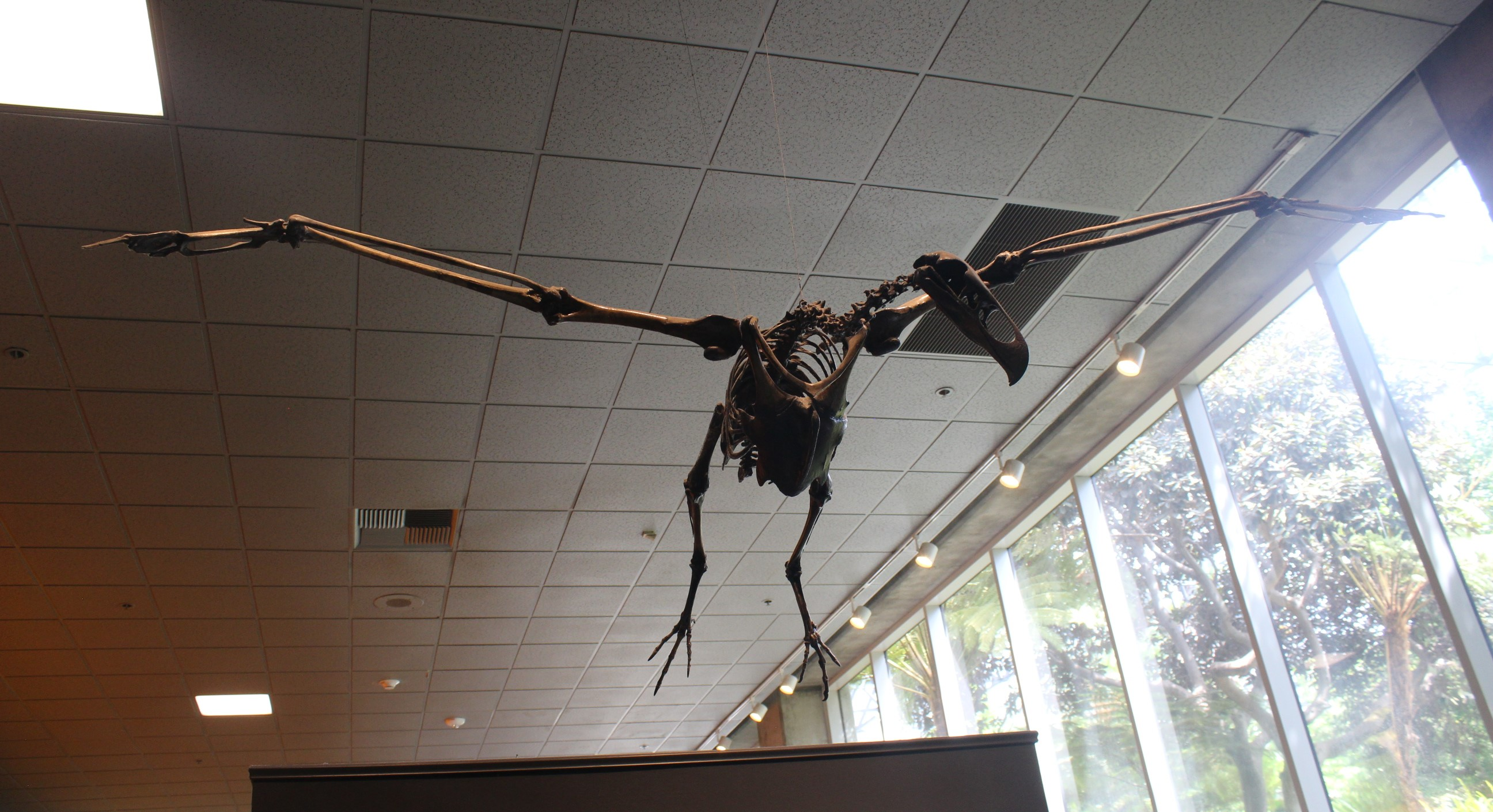
T. merriami skeleton from the La Brea tar pits in flight pose

- Teratornis merriami. This is by far the best-known and most commonly found species. Up to a hundred specimens have been found, mostly from the La Brea Tar Pits. It stood about 75 cm (29.5 in) tall with estimated wingspan of perhaps 3.5 to 3.8 metres (11.5 to 12.5 ft), and its weight has been estimated within the range of 12.5–15.0 kilograms (27.6–33.1 lb) with 95% confidence; making it about a third bigger than extant condors. It became extinct at the very end of the Pleistocene, some 10,000 years ago. Before the formation of the Teratornithidae family, T. merriami's hooked beak and skull morphology led to its initial placement in the family Vulturidae alongside New World Vultures. Further analysis has suggested a potentially equal relation to storks in the Ciconiidae family. Despite similarities, these three families can be differentiated by their differing skulls in response to significantly different feeding methods.
- Teratornis woodburnensis. The first species to be found north of the La Brea Tar Pits, this partial specimen was discovered at Legion Park, Woodburn, Oregon in 1999. It is known from a humerus, parts of the cranium, beak, sternum, and vertebrae which indicate an estimated wingspan of over 4 meters (14 ft). The find dates to the late Pleistocene, about 12,000 years ago, in a stratum containing the remains of megafauna such as mammoth, mastodon, and ground sloths, as well as evidence of early human occupancy at the site.

Another form, "Teratornis" olsoni, was described from the Pleistocene of Cuba, but its affinities are not completely resolved; it might not be a teratorn, but has also been placed in its own genus, Oscaravis. There are also undescribed fossils from southwestern Ecuador, but apart from these forms, teratorns were restricted to North America.

A closely related genus, Aiolornis, was about 40% larger and lived at an earlier time; it was formerly known as Teratornis incredibilis, but is distinct enough to be placed in its own genus.

== Description ==
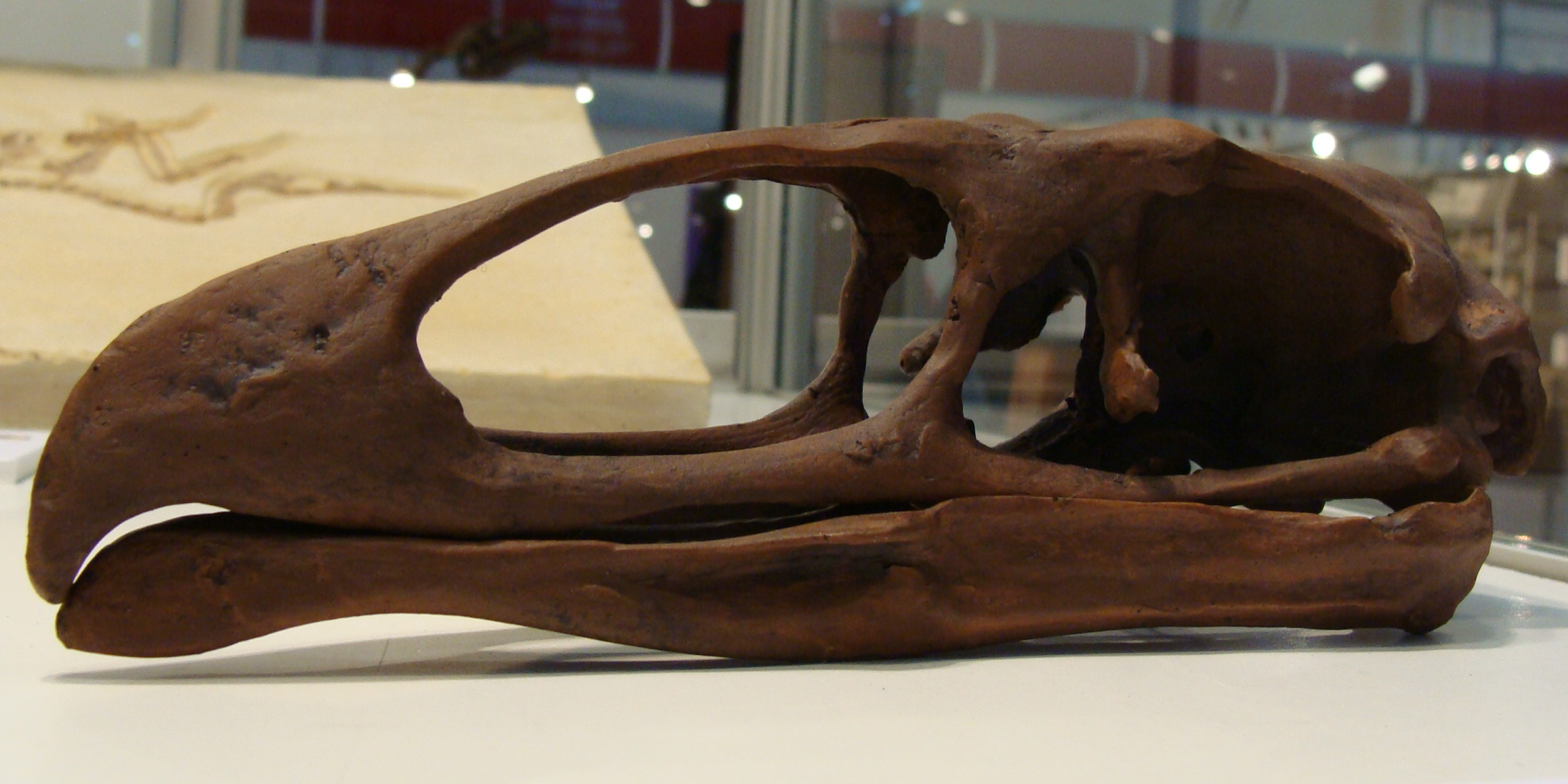
Reconstructed skull

According to description of 1945, Teratornis merriami had a wingspan of around 3.5 to 3.8 m (11 to 12 ft) and a wing area of 17.5 square meters, standing an estimated 75 cm (30 in) tall. It was somewhat larger than the extant Andean condor, and by calculating the area of the organism's sternum and synsacrum, Teratornis was estimated to weigh about 22.5 kg (50 lb), which was nearly double the weight of an average Californian condor. A 1983 study gives a range of wingspan of 2.938–3.379 m (9.64–11.09 ft) and a weight of 13.7 kg (30 lb).

The finger bones of Teratornis were fused as in all modern birds; however, part of the index finger forms a shelf which aided in bearing the load of long and stout primaries, enabling the bird to utilize strong upcurrents in flight. Their legs were similar to an Andean condor's, but stouter, and the feet could hold prey for tearing off pieces, but could not exert a very forceful grip like birds of prey. Its wing loading was not much larger than a Californian condor's, and Merriam's teratorn should have been able to take off by simply jumping and beating its wings under most circumstances. Nonetheless, it seems to have been better adapted for utilizing a short run into the wind from an elevated location as condors do, as its legs are proportionally smaller and its stride less than in condors. Thus, Teratornis may have primarily inhabited cliff terrain, where it could take off and soar through the air easily.

== Paleobiology ==
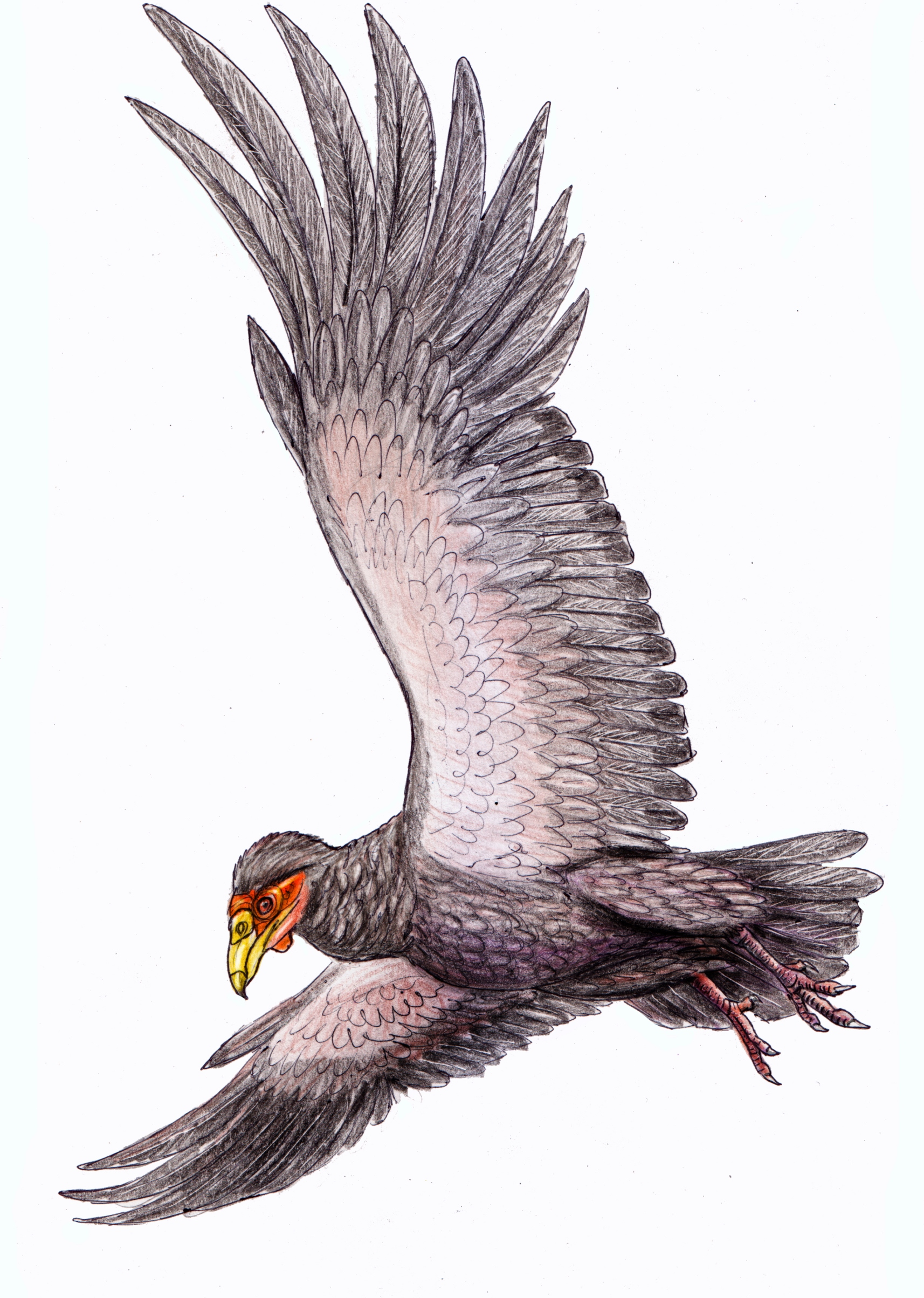
Life restoration of T. merriami

=== Diet and feeding habits ===
Teratornis merriami was similar to condors, although an analysis of the functional morphology of its skull, namely its larger beak and ability to spread its mandibles and swallow its prey whole, suggests that it was an active predator rather than a scavenger. In fact, some studies of skull morphology indicated that T. merriami was incapable of tearing pieces of flesh off of carcasses in the manner of condors. Alternative viewpoints note that many Old World vultures possess large bills, and a longer bill is a common feature among scavenging raptors, as this allows them to probe deeper into large carcasses - larger than those fed upon by active-hunting raptors. Other anatomical features, such as the relatively small and sideward facing orbits and the low skull, are also consistent with a scavenging lifestyle. For T. merriami, small prey such as frogs, lizards, young birds, and small mammals were swallowed whole, while carrion would have been fed on in a manner similar to that of condors or vultures. δ^{2}H, δ^{13}C, and δ^{15}N analysis has found that T. merriami relied significantly on terrestrial megafaunal carrion, which may have contributed to its disappearance during the Late Pleistocene megafaunal extinction.

=== Locomotion ===
An analysis of the teratorn pelvic girdle and stout, columnar hind leg bones suggests that its legs had greater anteroposterior ability than those of condors, and that the birds were agile and well-suited for walking and stalking prey on the ground similarly to storks and turkeys.

On the other hand, their flight was similar to that of condors. Condors fly by means of soaring on rising up-currents, generally weak currents that are subject to sudden changes in direction or strength. Their ability to react to these changes and maintain flight has to do with their emarginated primary feathers which separate and move independently during flight, contrary to the unemarginated primary feathers of birds who dynamically soar on more reliable air currents.

=== Habitat ===
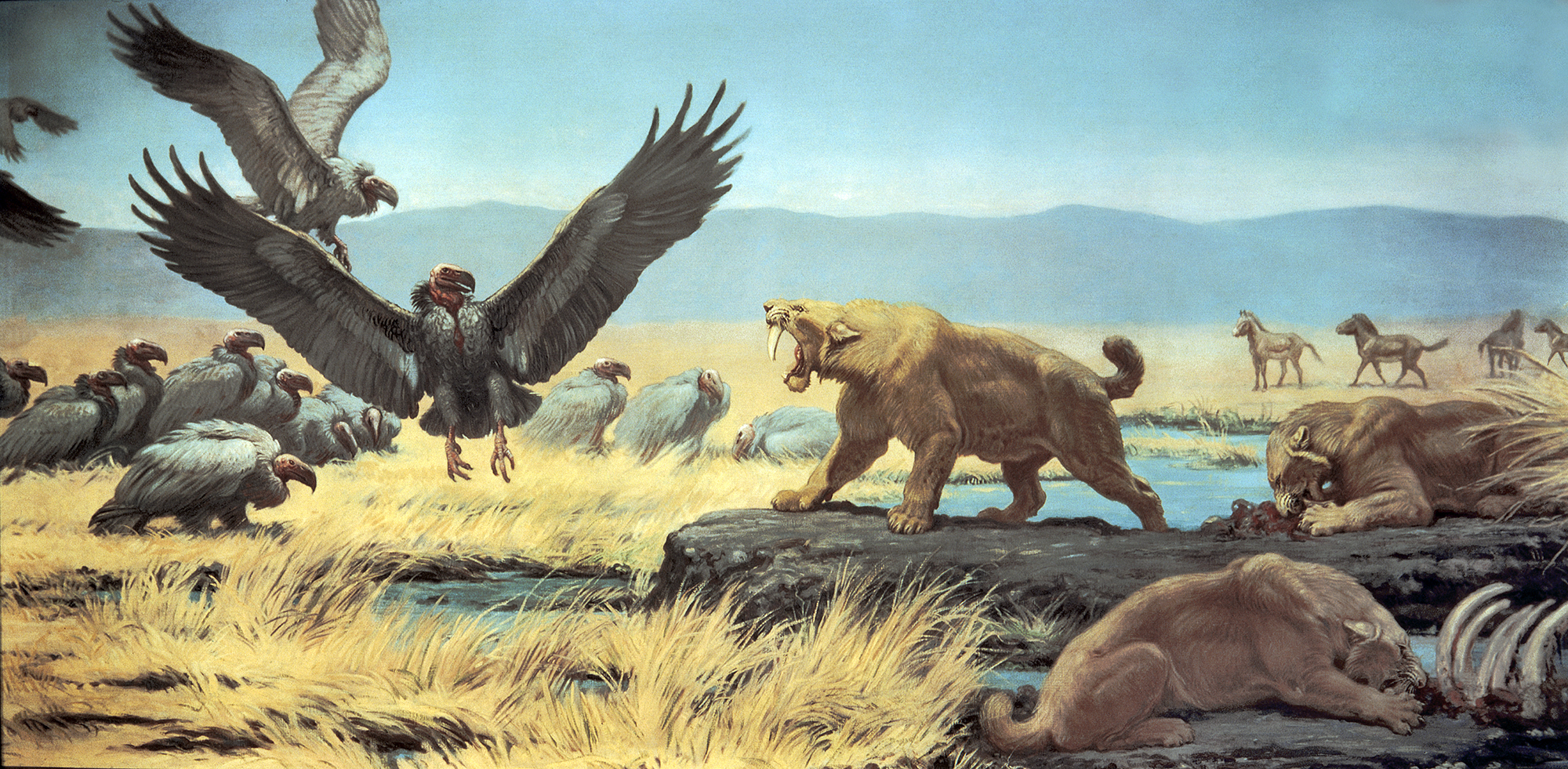
Illustration of a Teratornis group approaching feeding Smilodon at the La Brea Tar Pits, by Charles R. Knight, ca 1931

Teratornis had legs that were too short for it to take flight by running on flat ground. It is theorized that Teratornis primarily inhabited cliff terrain, where it could take off and soar through the air easily.

Many teratorn bone samples contributing to modern research have been found at the La Brea Tar Pits in Los Angeles, California. Teratorns are thought to have been attracted by Pleistocene megafauna that became stuck and died in the viscous asphalt while trying to drink from pools of water that gathered on the surface, with the teratorns subsequently falling victim to the sticky deposits. Merriam's teratorn probably played an important role in opening up the body cavities of carcasses trapped in asphalt for smaller birds like eagles and ravens, which are also known to have frequented the locality, as mammalian predators would have been unable to reach most carcasses without getting mired in the asphalt themselves.
