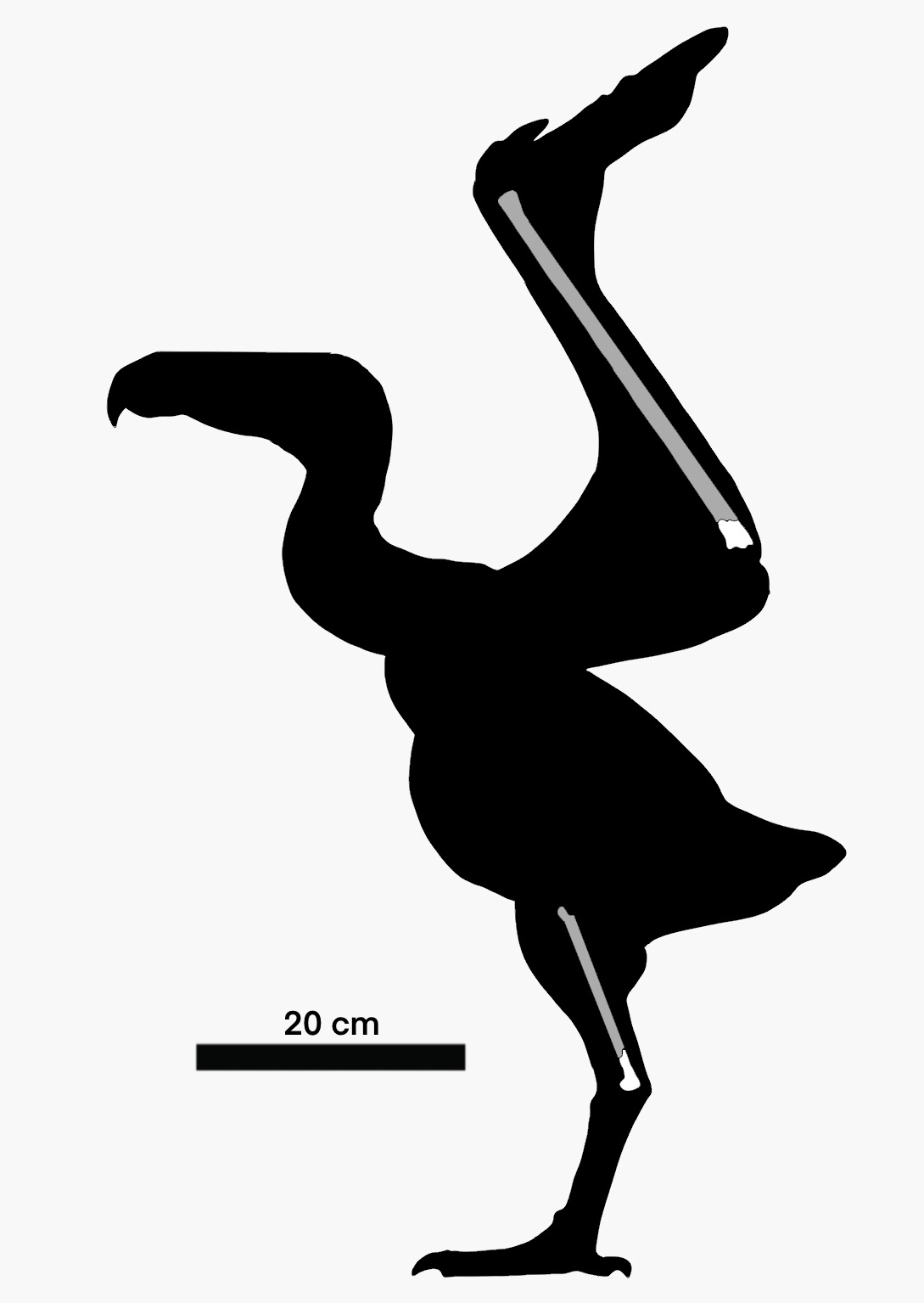

Scientific classification
- Kingdom: Animalia
- Phylum: Chordata
- Class: Aves
- Order: Accipitriformes
- Family: †Teratornithidae
- Genus: †Taubatornis; Olson & Alvarenga 2002
- Species: †T. campbelli

Binomial name
- †Taubatornis campbelli Olson & Alvarenga 2002

= Taubatornis =

Taubatornis Temporal range: Late Oligocene-Early Miocene (Deseadan) ~25 Ma

Extinct genus of birds

Taubatornis is an extinct genus of teratorn from the Late Oligocene to Early Miocene (Deseadan) Tremembé Formation, in the Taubaté Basin, São Paulo state, Brazil. The type species is T. campbelli. It is the oldest known member of the family, about 25 million years old. The presence of a member of this family with this age supports the hypothesis of a South American origin for the Teratornithidae.
