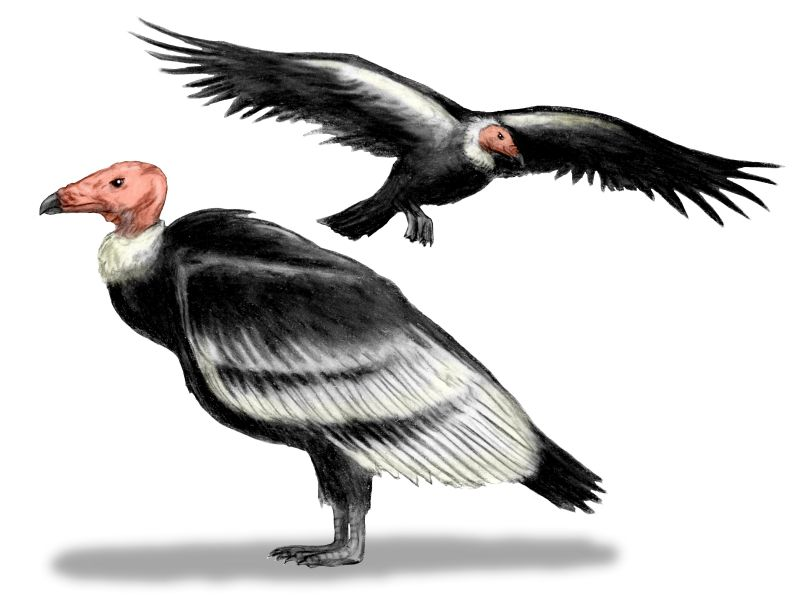

Scientific classification
- Kingdom: Animalia
- Phylum: Chordata
- Class: Aves
- Order: Cathartiformes
- Family: †Teratornithidae
- Genus: †Aiolornis; Campbell, Scott & Springer, 1999
- Species: †A. incredibilis

Binomial name
- †Aiolornis incredibilis (Howard, 1952)

Synonyms
- Teratornis incredibilis Howard, 1952

= Aiolornis =

Aiolornis Temporal range: Early Pliocene - Late Pleistocene 5.33–0.11 Ma

Species of birds

Aiolornis incredibilis is an extinct species of teratorn bird from the western United States. Only fragmentary remains have been found, which are dated between the Early Pliocene (Zanclean) and Late Pleistocene. First described as Teratornis incredibilis by Howard in 1952 based on a cuneiform bone, the species has been moved to the new genus Aiolornis by Campbell, Scott and Springer in 1999. The generic name is derived from the ancient Greek words aiolus and ornis. Aiolus refers to the Greek god of the wind, and ornis means "bird". The specific name incredibilis means 'incredible'. A. incredibilis is lesser-known than its close relative, Teratornis merriami, even though A. incredibilis was significantly larger. It presumably became extinct at the same time as the other megafauna in North America.

== History of discovery ==
The first Aiolornis material, described in 1952, was a cuneiform bone found in Smith Creek Cave, White Pine County, which is located 34 miles north of Baker, Nevada. The fossil was found to be from the Quaternary, and similarities with Teratornis merriami were noted in the description, hence the usage of the name T. incredibilis in the original description of the bird. The specimen was deemed distinct enough to warrant the naming of a new species based on its sheer size and other differences. The holotype specimen (on which the species is based) is around 40% larger than the same bone in T. merriami.

In a redescription published in 1999, the species was moved into its own genus, Aiolornis, as A. incredibilis. Prior to this redescription, four additional specimens had been referred to T. incredibilis, although they were not diagnostic. There is also a lack of certainty on whether all of this material actually belongs to Aiolornis, due to the fragmentary nature of the fossils and the large timespan they represent. The fossils include the proximal end of an ulna, the distal end of a radius, the fragmentary proximal end of a carpometacarpus, and the anterior portion of a beak.

The 1999 paper also refers a new bone to the species, a partial humerus (upper arm bone). The specimen was collected at Quintin Lake in April 1993, which is located approximately 1 km northeast of Murrieta, Riverside County, California. It differs from that of T. merriami in multiple aspects. The many differences between A. incredibilis and T. merriami supported the erection of the new genus Aiolornis for the former.

== Description ==
Aiolornis is classified as a teratorn, and its past affiliation with the much better preserved Teratornis allows for inferences about its appearance. It is usually depicted as a larger version of Teratornis. Aiolornis differs from Teratornis in a number of places, most obvious of which is size. Its wingspan is estimated to have been between 5 and 5.5 meters, and its weight at around 23 kg, which make it one of the largest, if not the largest, flight-capable bird from North America.

The holotype material differs from that of T. merriami in a few key ways. For instance, present on the os carpi ulnare of Aiolornis is a prominent ridge, which forms the end of the facies articularis ulnaris and extends further beyond this, coming close to the attachment point for the ulno-ulnocarpal ligament. This attachment point is also proportionally longer than the same point in Teratornis, and it protrudes more prominently from the bone. The facies articularis ulnaris is also slightly more concave than that of Teratornis, with the dorsal rim lower than the ventral rim.

The partial humerus described in the 1999 paper also differs from that of T. merriami and that of Argentavis magnificens in a number of ways, but most prominently in the fact that the facies dorsalis is fairly flat for the length of the attachment of the M. latissimus dorsi, becoming slightly convex near its distal end, and that the facies posterioris and facies dorsalis meet at a near right angle, with line of insertion of the M. latissimus dorsi following a well-defined "corner" of the margo anteriodorsalis.

== Classification ==
Aiolornis is classified within Teratornithidae, which is a family in the order Cathartiformes. The order also includes the extinct and extant New World vultures. Teratornithidae has only been included in a single phylogenetic analysis, published by Steven Emslie in 1988. The analysis was conducted using cranial characters of various taxa within the order Ciconiiformes, with a specific focus on Vulturidae (Cathartidae). This analysis included Teratornis merriami as a representative of Teratornithidae, and found the group to be just outside of Vulturidae.

- Ciconiiformes
  - Ciconiidae
  - - Teratornithidae
    - Vulturidae
      - Cathartes
      - - Coragyps
        - - Sarcorhamphus
          - - - Breagyps
              - Vultur
            - - - Gymnogyps kofordi
                - Gymnogyps californianus
