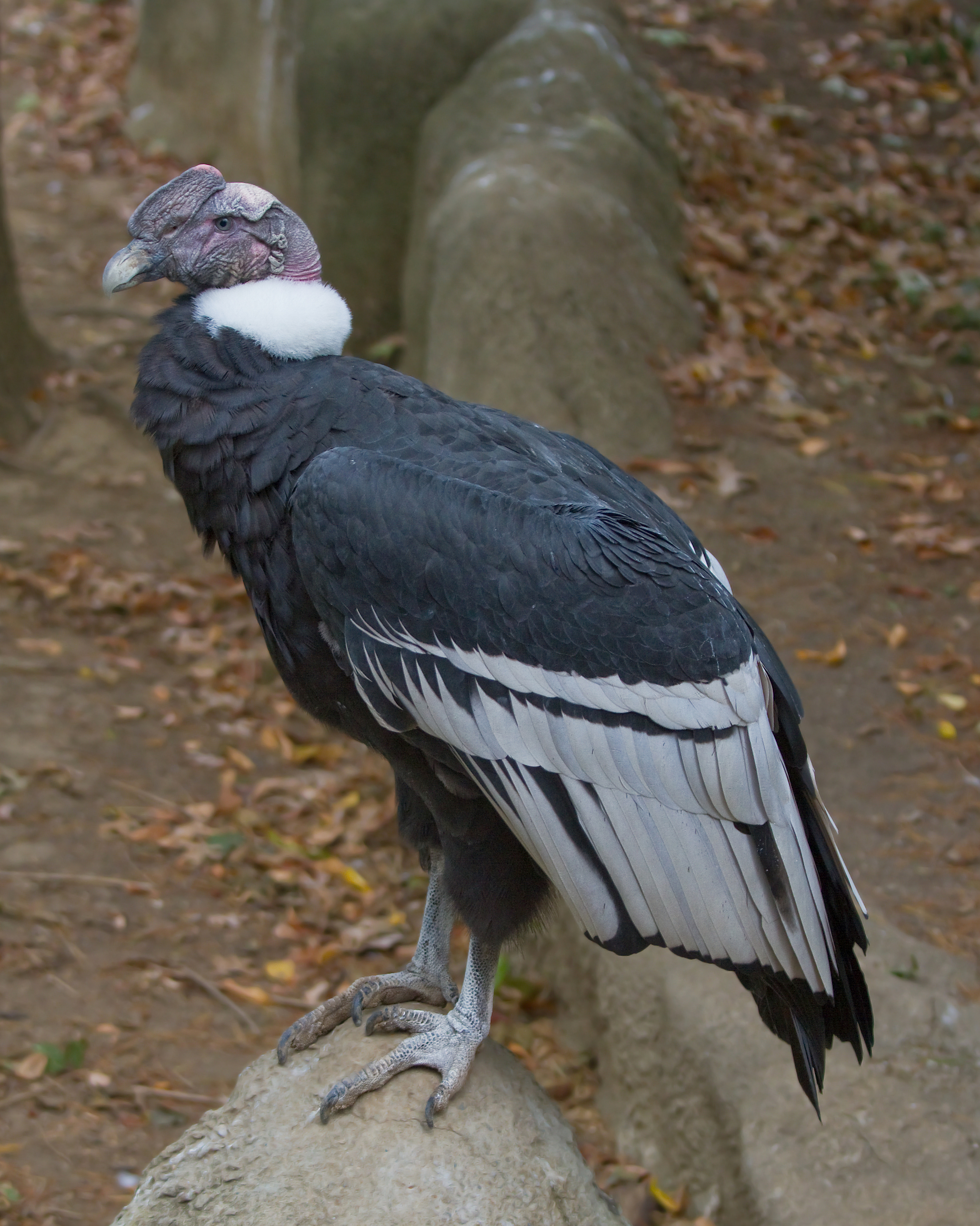
- Male at the Cincinnati Zoo
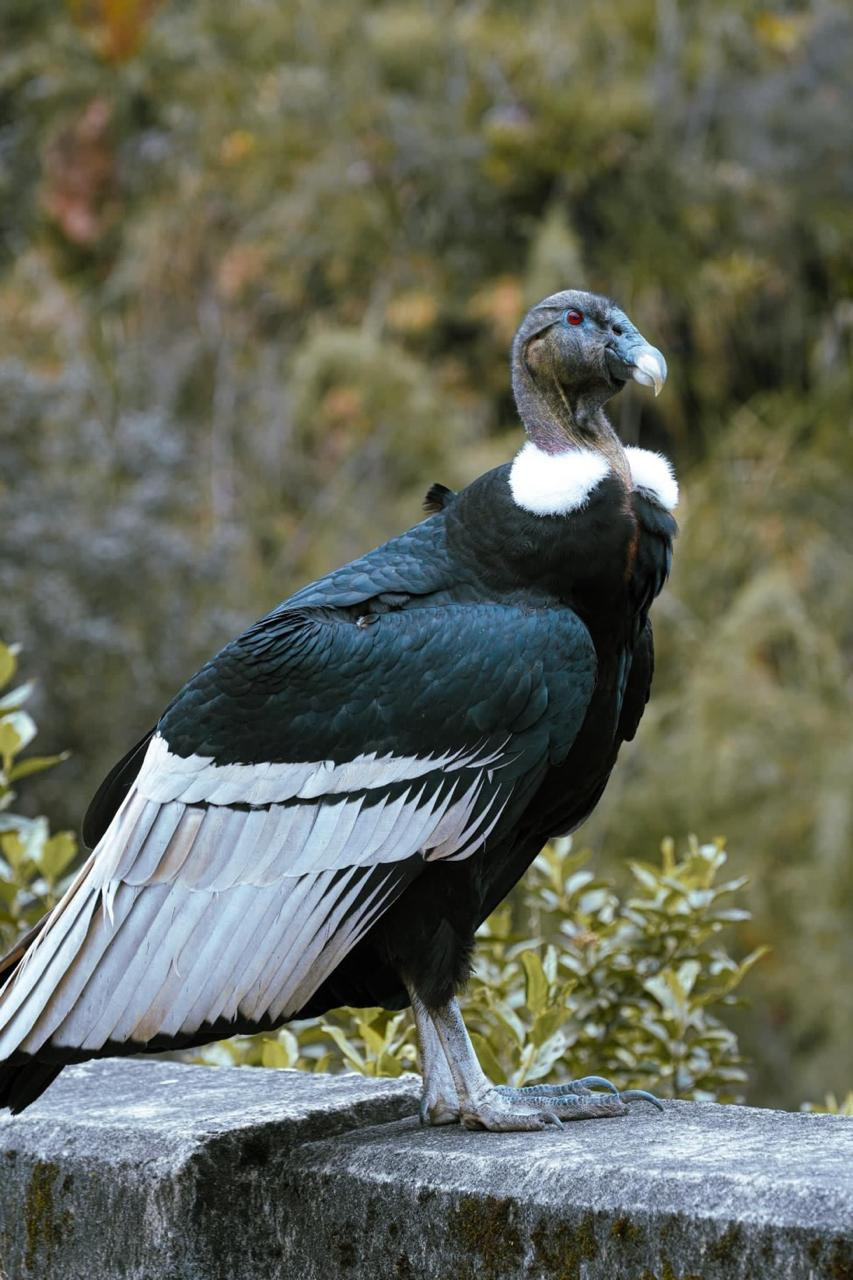
- Female at Chingaza National Natural Park, Colombia

Conservation status
- Vulnerable (IUCN 3.1)
- CITES Appendix I

Scientific classification
- Kingdom: Animalia
- Phylum: Chordata
- Class: Aves
- Order: Cathartiformes
- Family: Cathartidae
- Genus: Vultur
- Species: V. gryphus

Binomial name
- Vultur gryphus Linnaeus, 1758
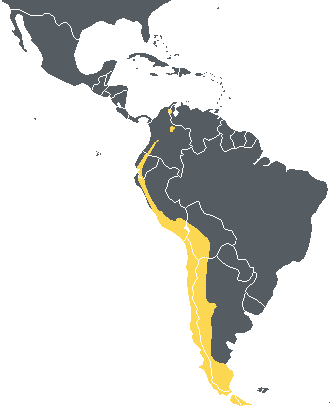
- Yellow – approximate range/distribution

Synonyms
- List: Vultur magellanicus Shaw, 1792; Sarcoramphus cuntur Duméril, 1806; Vultur condor Shaw, 1809; Sarcorhamphus aequatorialis Sharpe, 1874; Vultur fossilis Moreno & Mercerat, 1891; Vultur patruus Lönnberg, 1902; Vultur pratruus Emslie, 1988 (lapsus)

= Andean condor =

Andean condor Temporal range: 2.6–0 Ma Late Pliocene–Holocene

Species of bird

The Andean condor (Vultur gryphus) is a South American New World vulture and is the only extant member of the genus Vultur. It is found in the Andes mountains and adjacent Pacific coasts of western South America. With a maximum wingspan of 3.3 m (10 ft 10 in) and weight of 15 kg (33 lb), the Andean condor is one of the largest flying birds in the world, and is generally considered to be the largest bird of prey in the world.

One of two species commonly referred to as condors, it is a large black vulture with a ruff of white feathers surrounding the base of the neck and, especially in the male, large white patches on the wings. The head and neck are nearly featherless, and are a dull red color, which may flush and therefore change color in response to the bird's emotional state. In the male, there is a wattle on the neck and a large, dark red comb or caruncle on the crown of the head. The female condor is smaller than the male, an exception to the usual sexual dimorphism seen in birds of prey.

The condor is primarily a scavenger, feeding on carrion. It prefers large carcasses, such as those of deer or cattle. It reaches sexual maturity at five or six years of age and nests at elevations of up to 5,000 m (16,000 ft), generally on inaccessible rock ledges. One or two eggs are usually laid per clutch. It is one of the world's longest-living birds, with a lifespan of over 70 years in some cases.

The Andean condor is a national symbol of Bolivia, Chile, Colombia, Ecuador, and Peru and plays an important role in the folklore and mythology of the Andean regions. The Andean condor is considered vulnerable by the IUCN. It is threatened by habitat loss and by secondary poisoning from lead in carcasses killed by hunters. Captive breeding programs have been instituted in several countries.

== Taxonomy and systematics ==
The Andean condor was described by Swedish scientist Carl Linnaeus in 1758 in the tenth edition of his Systema Naturae and retains its original binomial name of Vultur gryphus.

=== Etymology ===
The Andean condor is sometimes called the Argentinean condor, Bolivian condor, Chilean condor, Colombian condor, Ecuadorian condor, or Peruvian condor after one of the nations to which it is native. The generic term Vultur is directly taken from the Latin vultur or voltur, which means "vulture". Its specific epithet is derived from a variant of the Greek word γρυπός (grupós, "hook-nosed"). The word condor itself is derived from the Quechua kuntur.

=== Phylogeny ===
The exact taxonomic placement of the Andean condor and the remaining six species of New World vultures remains unclear. Although New World and Old World vultures are similar in appearance and have similar ecological roles, they are not closely related, having evolved from different ancestors in different parts of the world. The difference between the two is currently under debate, with some earlier authorities suggesting that the New World vultures are more closely related to storks. More recent authorities maintain their overall position in the order Accipitriformes along with the Old World vultures or place them in their own order, Cathartiformes. The South American Classification Committee has removed the New World vultures from Ciconiiformes and instead described them as incertae sedis, but notes that a move to Falconiformes or Cathartiformes is possible.

=== Fossil record ===
The Andean condor is the only accepted living species of its genus, Vultur. Unlike the California condor (Gymnogyps californianus), which is known from extensive fossil remains and some additional ones of congeners, the fossil record of the Andean condor recovered to date is scant. Presumed Plio-Pleistocene species of South American condors were later recognized to be not different from the present species, although one known only from a few rather small bones found in a Pliocene deposit of Tarija Department, Bolivia, may have been a smaller palaeo subspecies, V. gryphus patruus.

== Distribution and habitat ==
The Andean condor is found in South America in the Andes and the Santa Marta Mountains. In the north, its present range begins in Venezuela and Colombia, where it is extremely rare, then continues south along the Andes in Ecuador, Peru, and Chile, through Bolivia and western Argentina to the Tierra del Fuego. However, its historic range was greater; in the early 19th century, the Andean condor bred from western Venezuela to Tierra del Fuego, along the entire chain of the Andes. Its range was significantly reduced due to human activity.

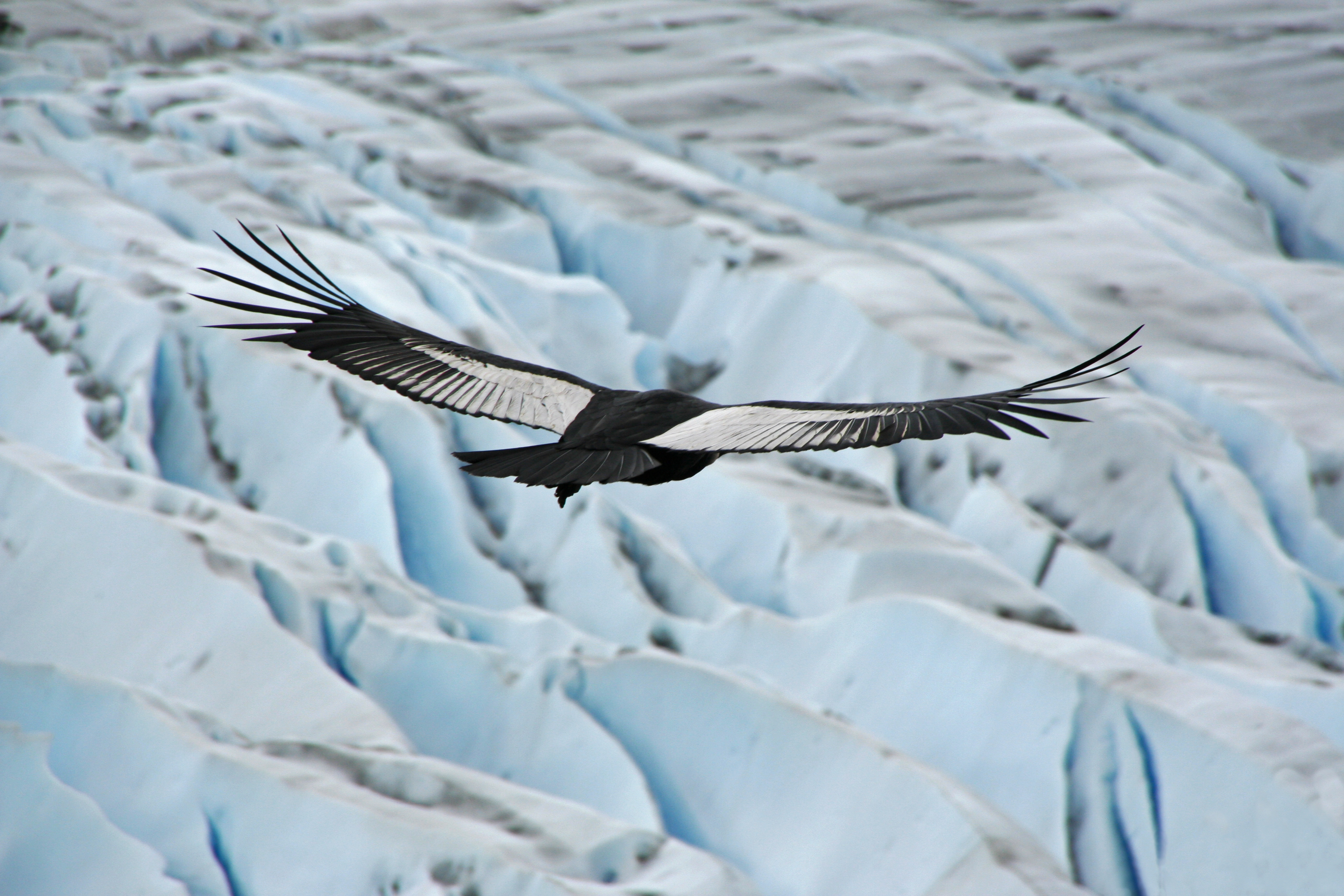
At Torres del Paine National Park, Chile

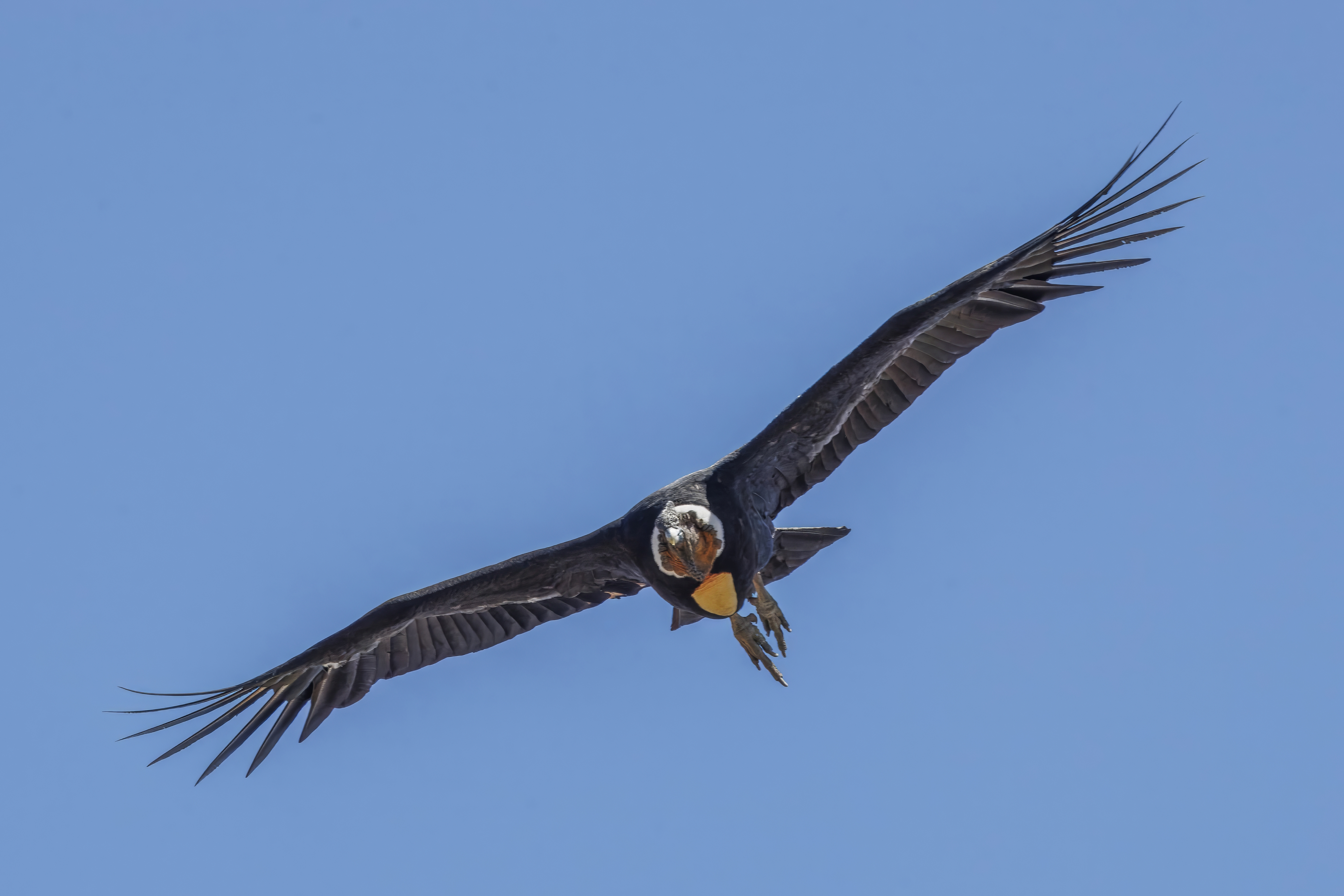
Male, Farellones, Chile

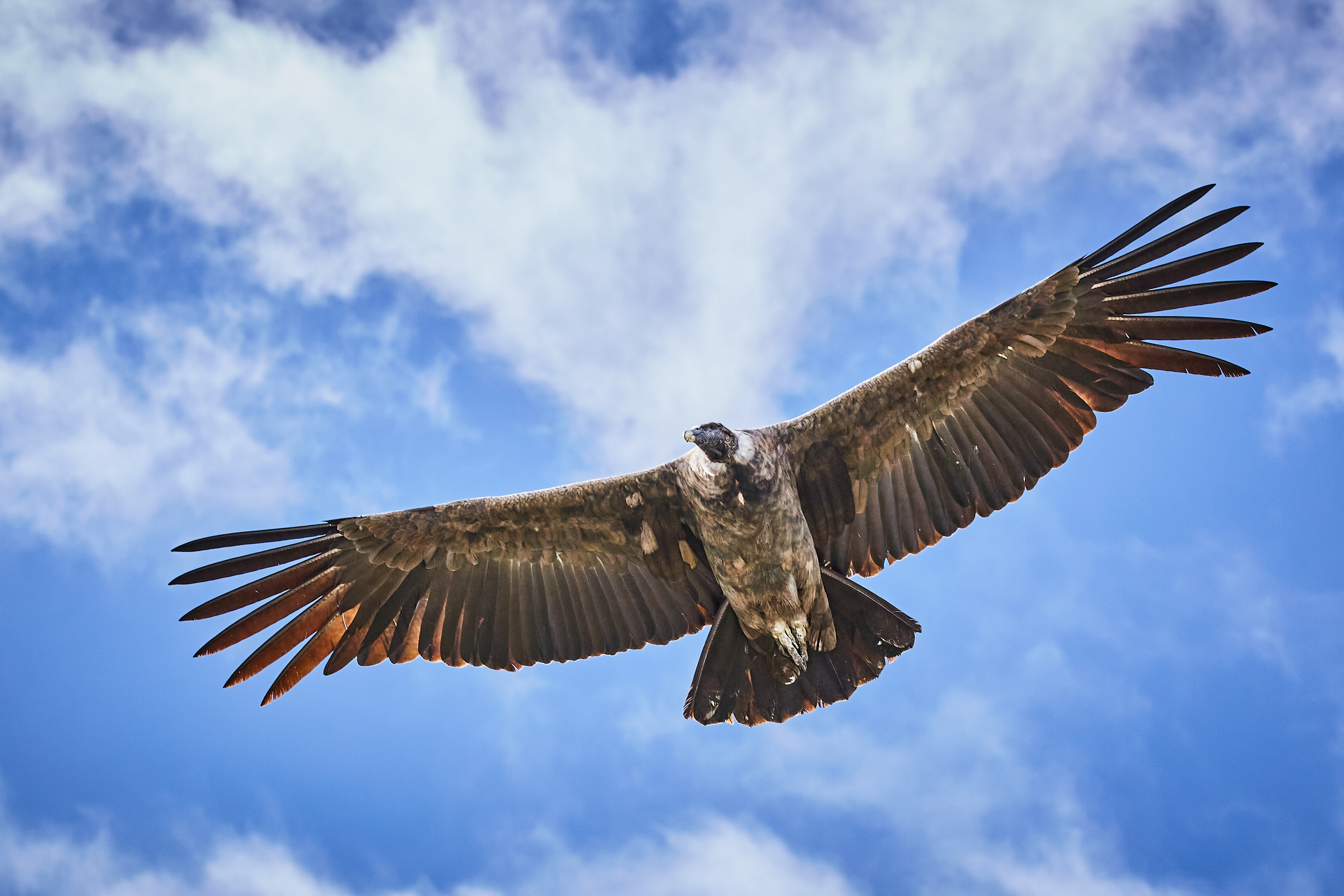
At Colca Canyon, Peru

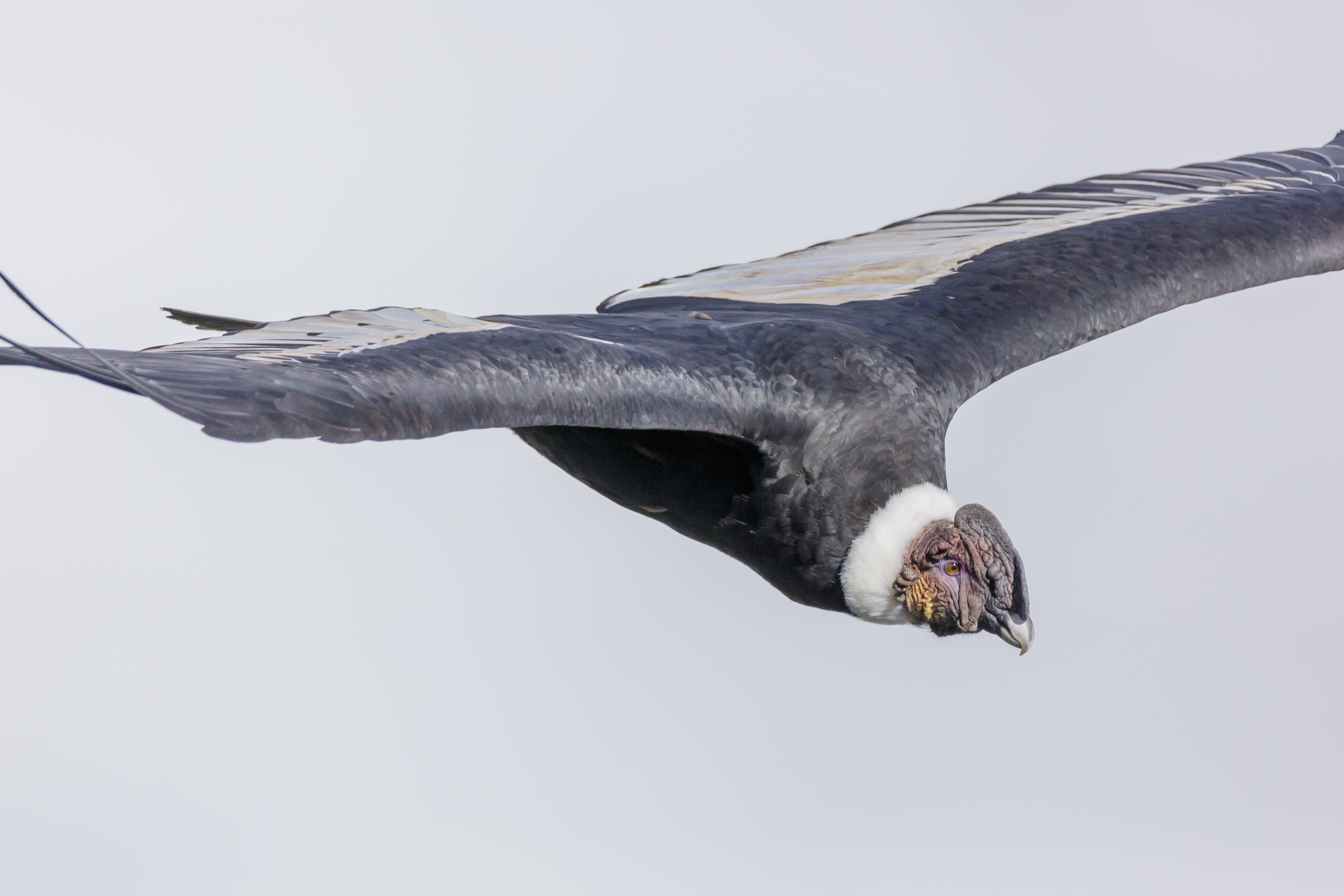
Adult male, in Peru

Its habitat is mainly composed of open grasslands and alpine areas up to 5,000 m (16,000 ft) in elevation. It prefers relatively open, non-forested areas which allow it to spot carrion from the air, such as the páramo or rocky, mountainous areas in general. It occasionally ranges to lowlands in eastern Bolivia, northern Peru, and southwestern Brazil, descends to lowland desert areas in Chile and Peru, and is found over southern-beech forests in Patagonia. In southern Patagonia, meadows are important for Andean condors as this habitat is likely to have herbivores present. In this region, Andean condor distributions are therefore influenced by the locations of meadows as well as cliffs for nesting and roosting.

== Description ==
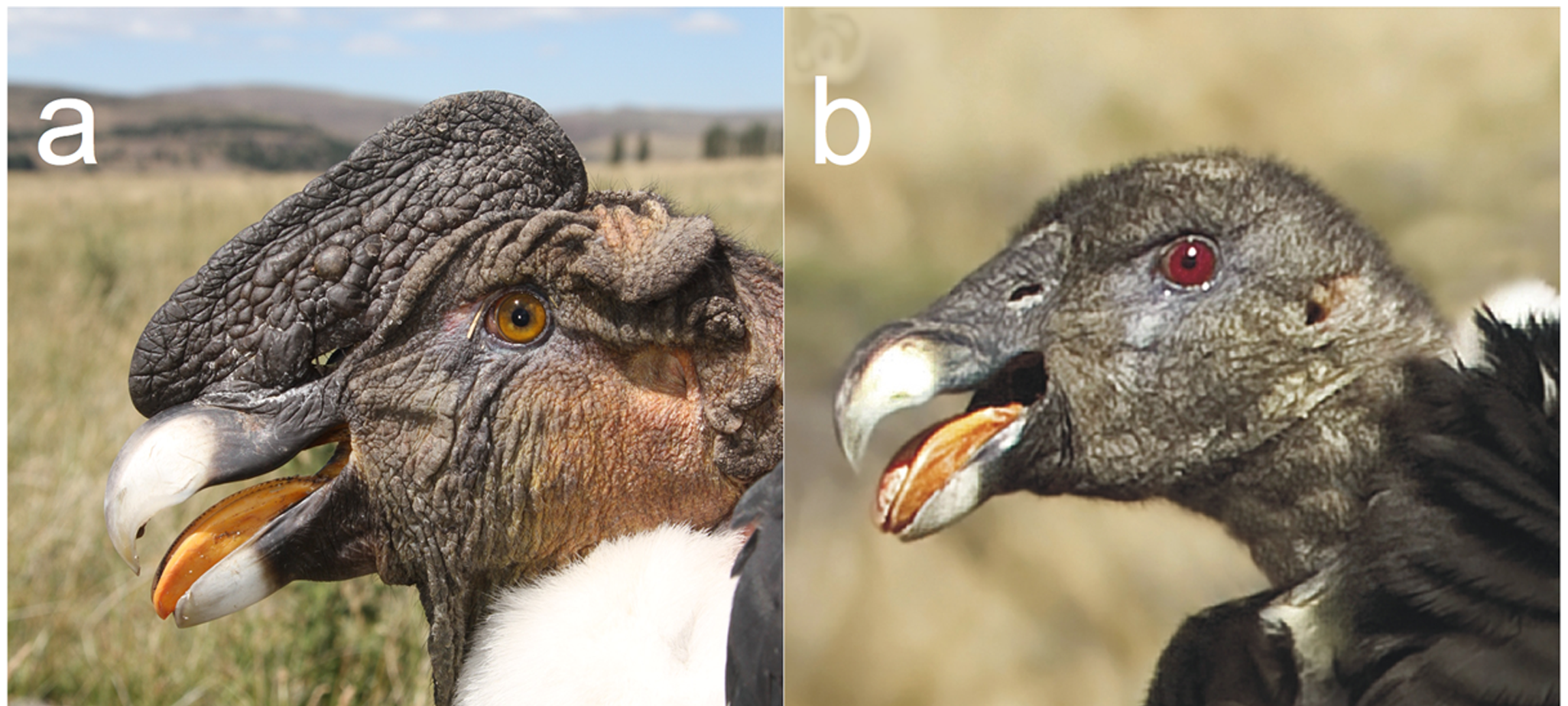
Adult male (a) and adult female (b). Showing the difference in skin and iris colour, as well as the male's comb.

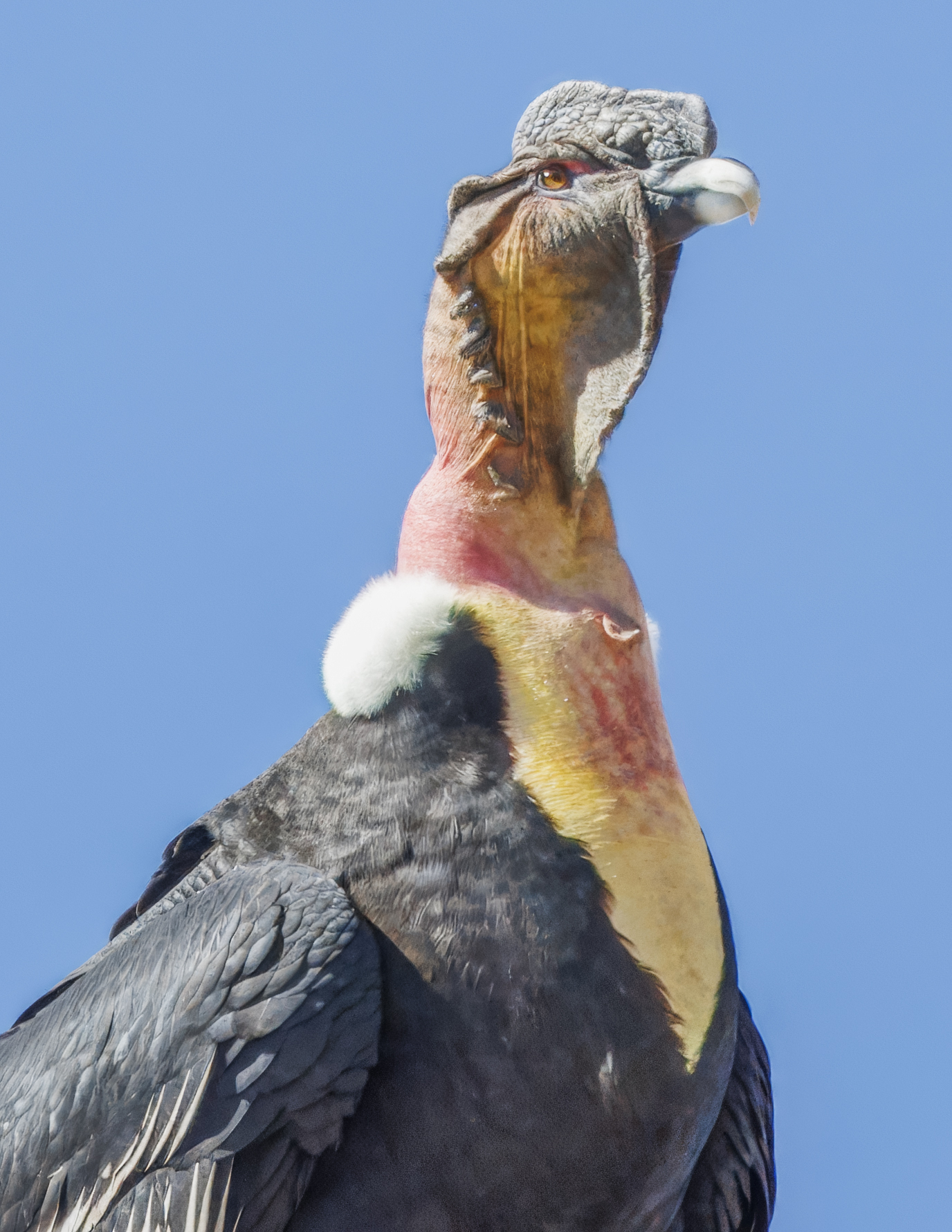
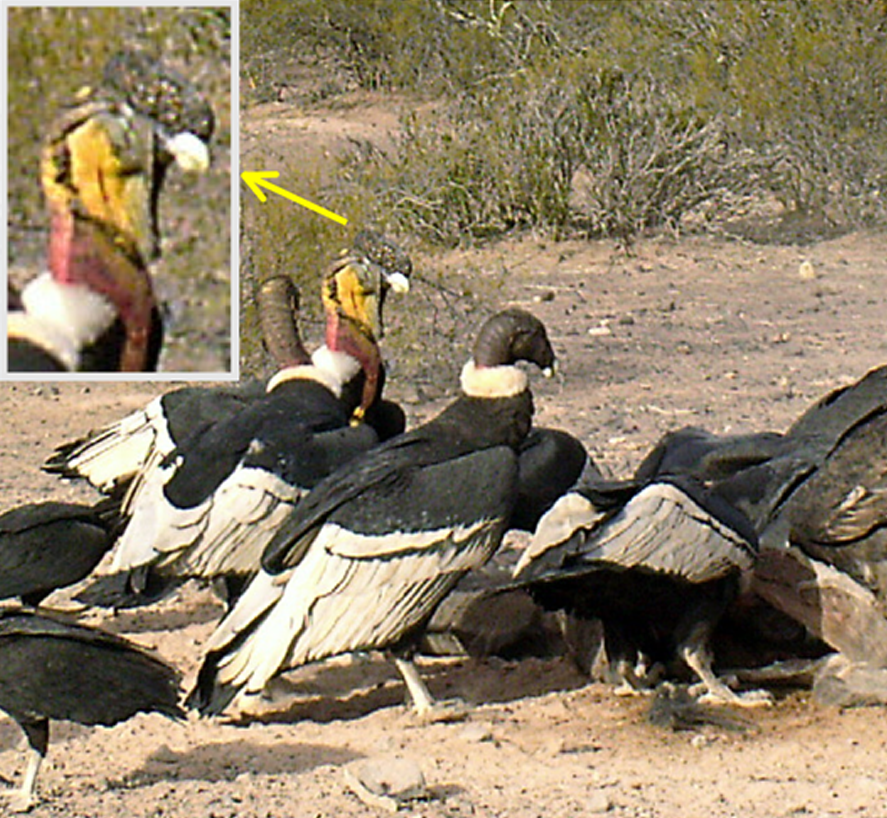
Necks of dominant males may flush a brilliant yellow, such as when feeding at carcasses to signify dominance.

The overall length of the Andean condor can range from 100–130 cm (3 ft 3 in – 4 ft 3 in). Among standard measurements, the wing chord is 75.7–85.2 cm (29.8–33.5 in), the tail is 33–38 cm (13–15 in) and the tarsus is 11.5–12.5 cm (4.5–4.9 in). Measurements are usually taken from specimens reared in captivity. The mean weight is 11.3 kg (25 lb), with the males averaging about a kilogram more at 12.5 kg (28 lb), the females two kilograms less at 10.1 kg (22 lb). Condors possess the heaviest average weight for any living flying bird or animal, ahead of trumpeter swans (Cygnus buccinator) and Dalmatian pelicans (Pelecanus crispus). However, other sources claim a mean species body mass of 10.3 kg (23 lb) for the Andean condor. The Andean condor is the largest living land bird capable of flight if measured in terms of average weight and wingspan, although male bustards of the largest species (far more sexually dimorphic in size) can weigh more. The mean wingspan is around 283 cm (9 ft 3 in) and the wings have the largest surface area of any extant bird. It has a maximum wingspan of 3.3 m (10 ft 10 in). Among living bird species, only the great albatrosses and the two largest species of pelican exceed the Andean condor in average and maximal wingspan.

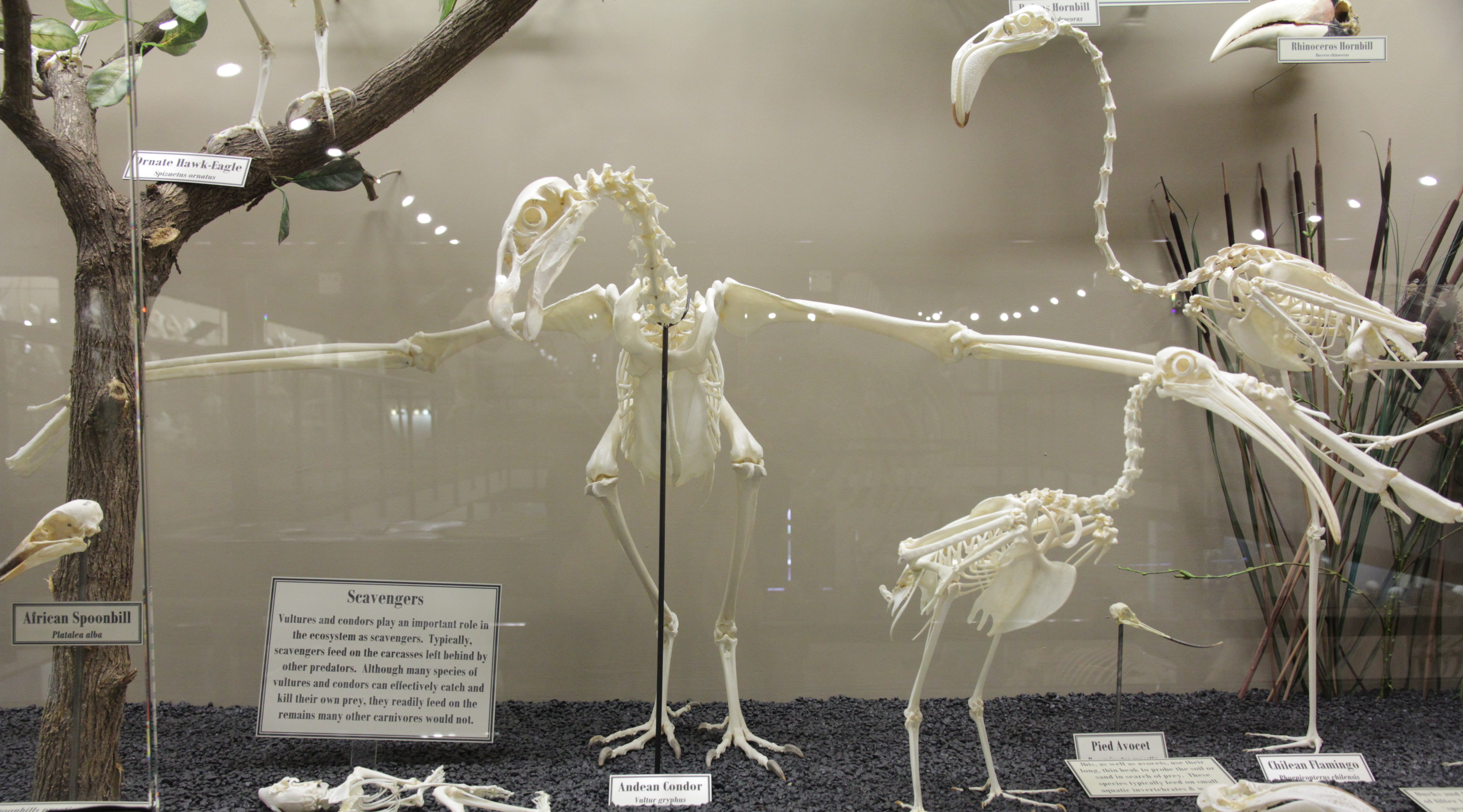
Andean condor skeleton (Museum of Osteology)

The adult plumage is all black, except for a frill of white feathers at the base of the neck and, especially in the male, large white bands on the wings, which only appear after the bird's first moult. The head and neck, kept meticulously clean, are red to blackish-red, and have few feathers. Their baldness means the skin is more exposed to the sterilizing effects of dehydration and high-altitude UV light. The crown of the head is flattened, and (in the male) is topped by a dark red comb (also called a caruncle); the skin hanging from its neck is called a wattle. Males also have yellower skin. When condors are agitated (for example, during courtship), their head and neck flush, a clear signal to animals nearby. This flush of colour is especially intense in dominant males when feeding at carcasses, and can happen in just a few seconds. Juveniles are grayish-brown, but with a blackish head and neck, and a brown ruff.

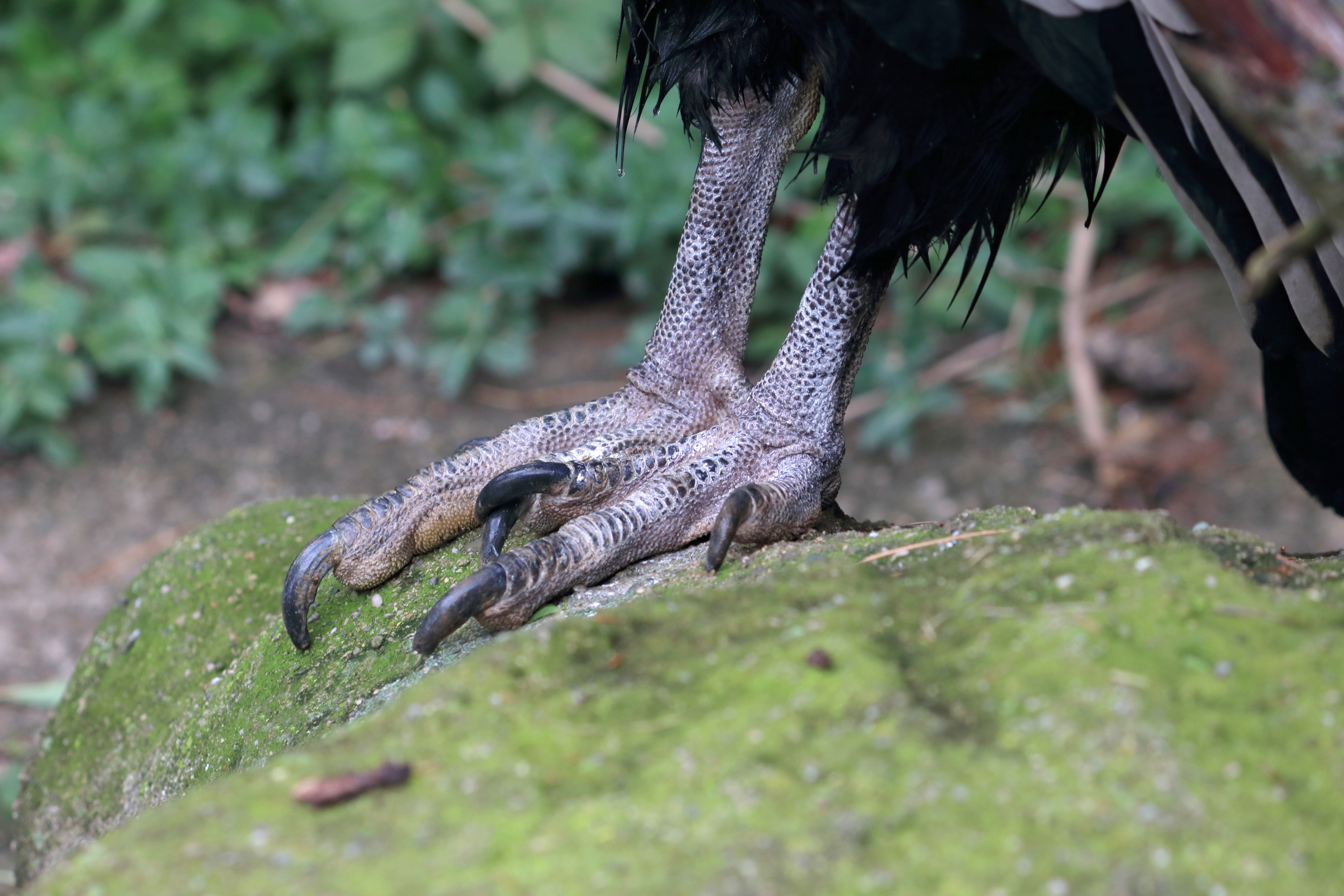
Closeup of talons, at the Cincinnati Zoo

The middle toe is greatly elongated, and the hind one is only slightly developed, while the talons of all the toes are comparatively straight and blunt. The feet are thus more adapted to walking, and are of little use as weapons or organs of prehension as in birds of prey and Old World vultures. The beak is hooked, and adapted to tear rotting meat. The irises of the male are brown, while those of the female are deep red. They have no eyelashes. Unlike the case with most other birds of prey, the female is smaller.

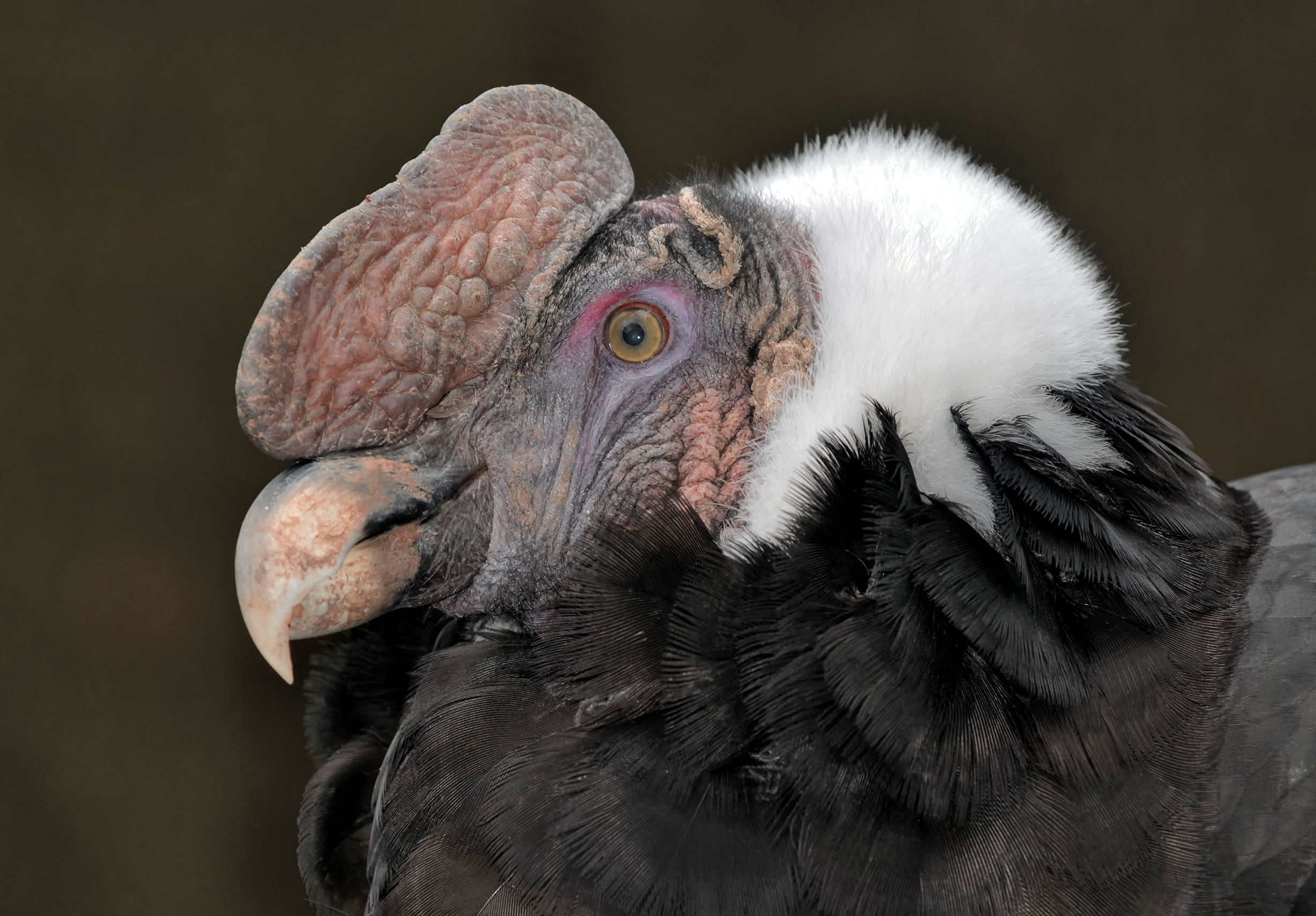
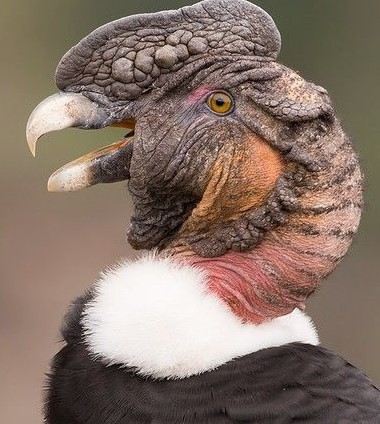
Closeups showing the variation in appearance between two separate males

Observation of wing color patterns, and the size and shape of the male's crest, are the best ways of identifying individual Andean condors. Sighting-resighting methods assess the size and structure of populations.

== Ecology and behavior ==
The condor soars with its wings held horizontally and its primary feathers bent upwards at the tips. The lack of a large sternum to anchor its correspondingly large flight muscles physiologically identifies it as primarily being a soarer. It flaps its wings on rising from the ground, but after attaining a moderate elevation it flaps its wings very rarely, relying on thermals to stay aloft. In The Voyage of the Beagle, Charles Darwin mentioned watching condors for half an hour without once observing a flap of their wings. It prefers to roost on high places from which it can launch without major wing-flapping effort. Andean condors are often seen soaring near rock cliffs, using the heat thermals to aid them in rising in the air. Flight recorders have shown that "75% of the birds' flapping was associated with take-off", and that it "flaps its wings just 1% of the time during flight". The proportion of time for flapping is more for short flights. Flapping between two thermal glides is more than flapping between two slope glides.

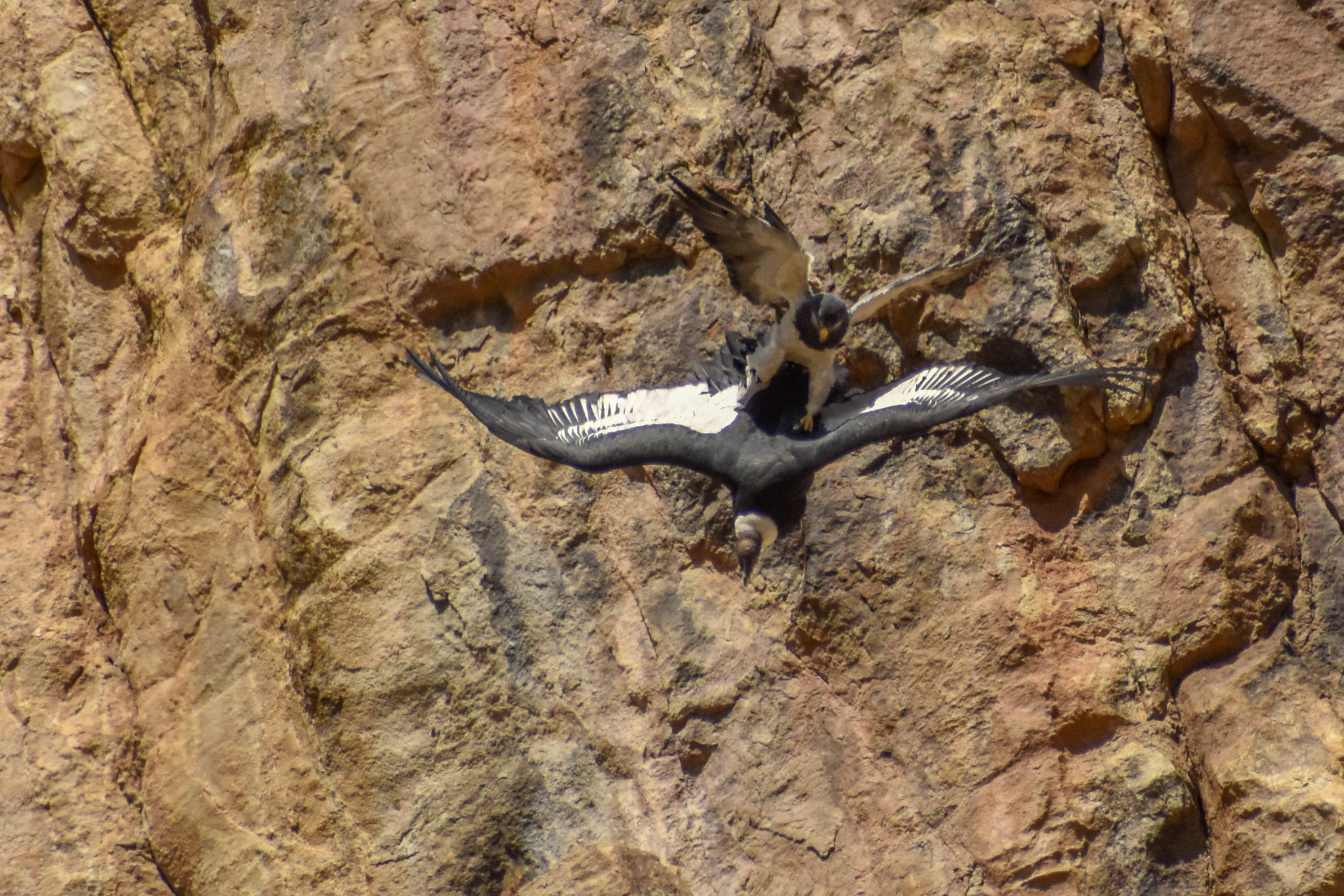
In conflict with a black-chested buzzard-eagle

Like other New World vultures, the Andean condor has the unusual habit of urohidrosis: it often empties its cloaca onto its legs and feet. A cooling effect through evaporation has been proposed as a reason for this behavior, but it does not make any sense in the cold Andean habitat of the bird. Because of this habit, their legs are often streaked with a white buildup of uric acid.

There is a well-developed social structure within large groups of condors, with competition to determine a 'pecking order' by body language, competitive play behavior, and vocalizations. Generally, mature males tend to be at the top of the pecking order, with post-dispersal immature males tending to be near the bottom.

=== Breeding ===
Sexual maturity and breeding behavior do not appear in the Andean condor until the bird is five or six years of age. It may live to 50 years or more, and it mates for life. During courtship displays, the skin of the male's neck flushes, changing from dull red to bright yellow, and inflates. He approaches the female with neck outstretched, revealing the inflated neck and the chest patch, while hissing, then extends his wings and stands erect while clicking his tongue. Other courtship rituals include hissing and clucking while hopping with wings partially spread, and dancing.

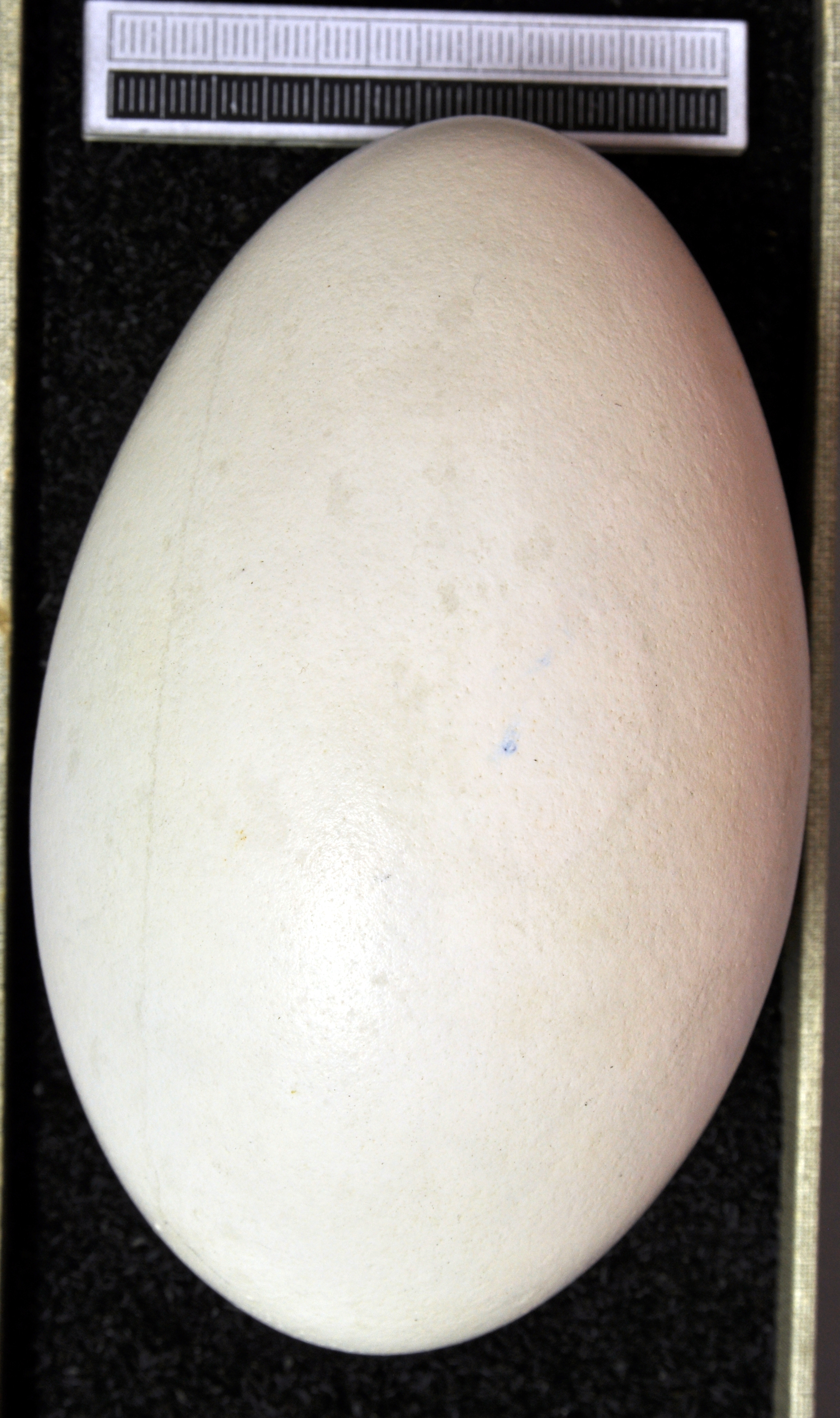
Egg, Collection Museum Wiesbaden

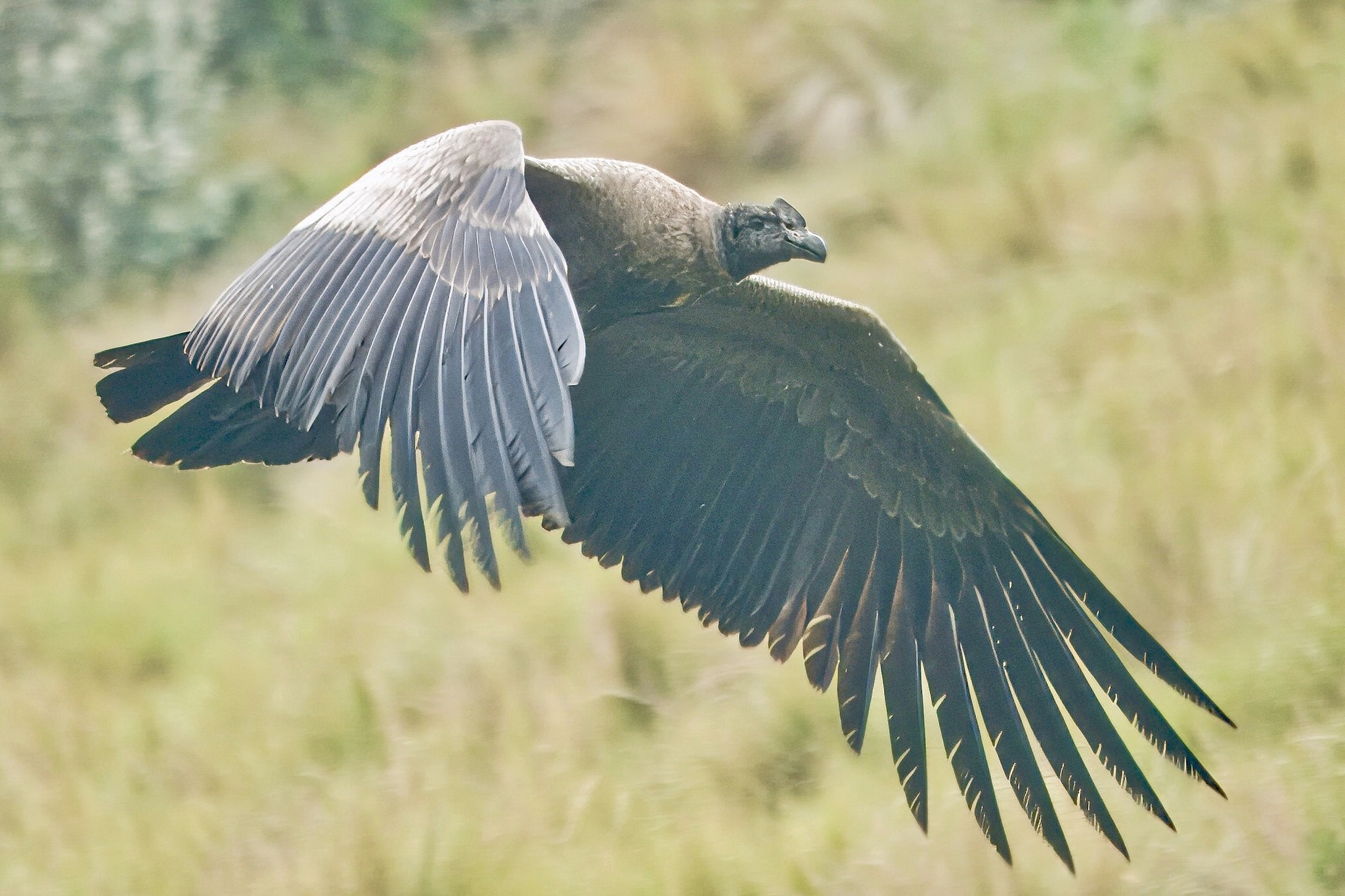
Juvenile male, in Ecuador

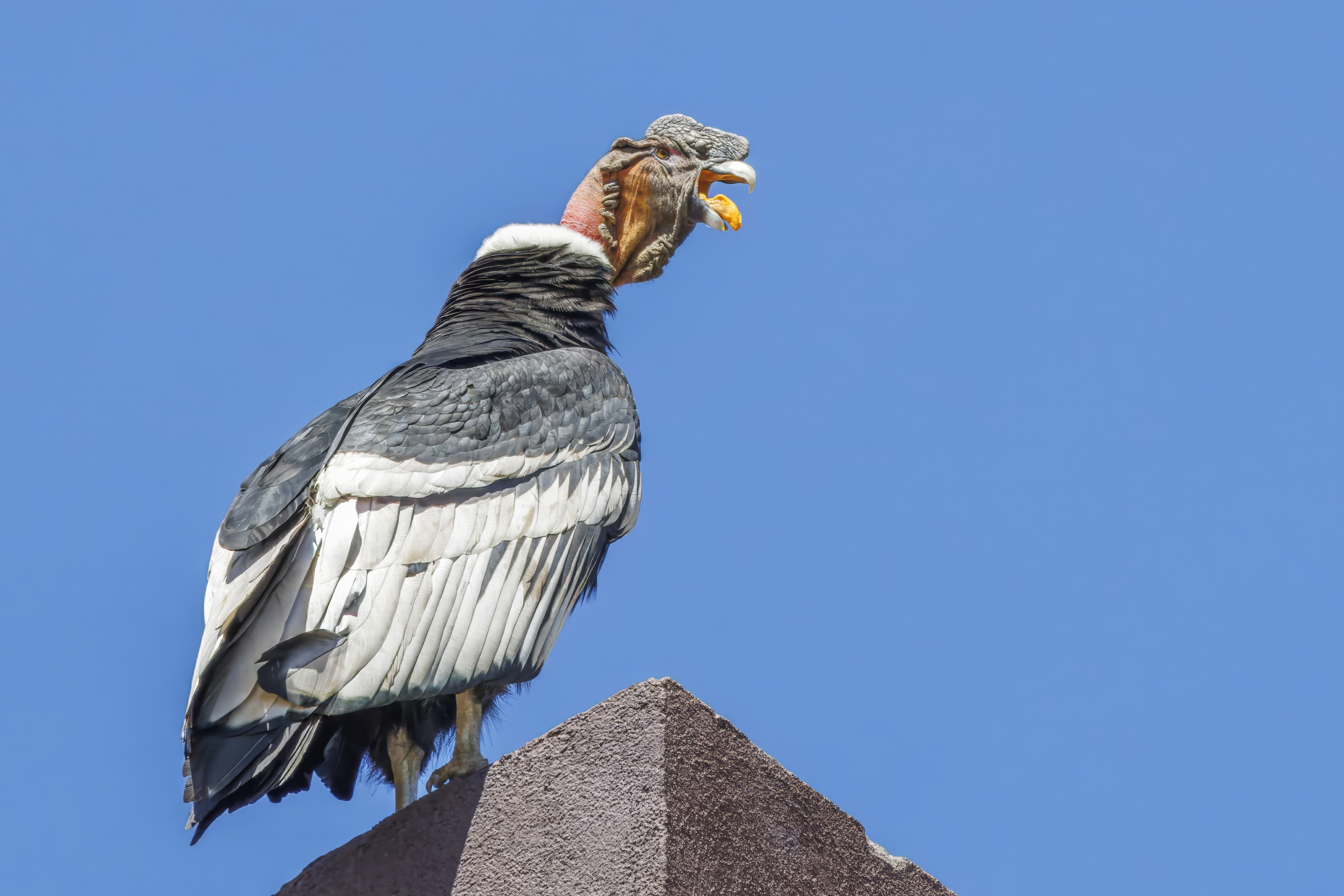
Adult male in Farellones, Chile

The Andean condor prefers to roost and breed at elevations of 3,000 to 5,000 m (9,800 to 16,400 ft). Its nest, which consists of a few sticks placed around the eggs, is created on inaccessible ledges of rock. However, in coastal areas of Peru, where there are few cliffs, some nests are simply partially shaded crannies scraped out against boulders on slopes. It deposits one bluish-white egg, weighing about 280 g (9.9 oz) and ranging from 75 to 100 mm (3.0 to 3.9 in) in length. Breeding occurs about every second year, in the southern Andes around October, in the central and northern Andes it can be throughout the year. The egg hatches after 54 to 58 days of incubation by both parents. If the chick or egg is lost or removed, another egg is laid to take its place. Researchers and breeders take advantage of this behavior to double the reproductive rate by taking the first egg away for hand-rearing, causing the parents to lay a second egg, which they are generally allowed to raise. The young are covered with a grayish down until they are almost as large as their parents. They are able to fly after six months, but continue to roost and hunt with their parents until age two, when they are displaced by a new clutch.

=== Feeding ===
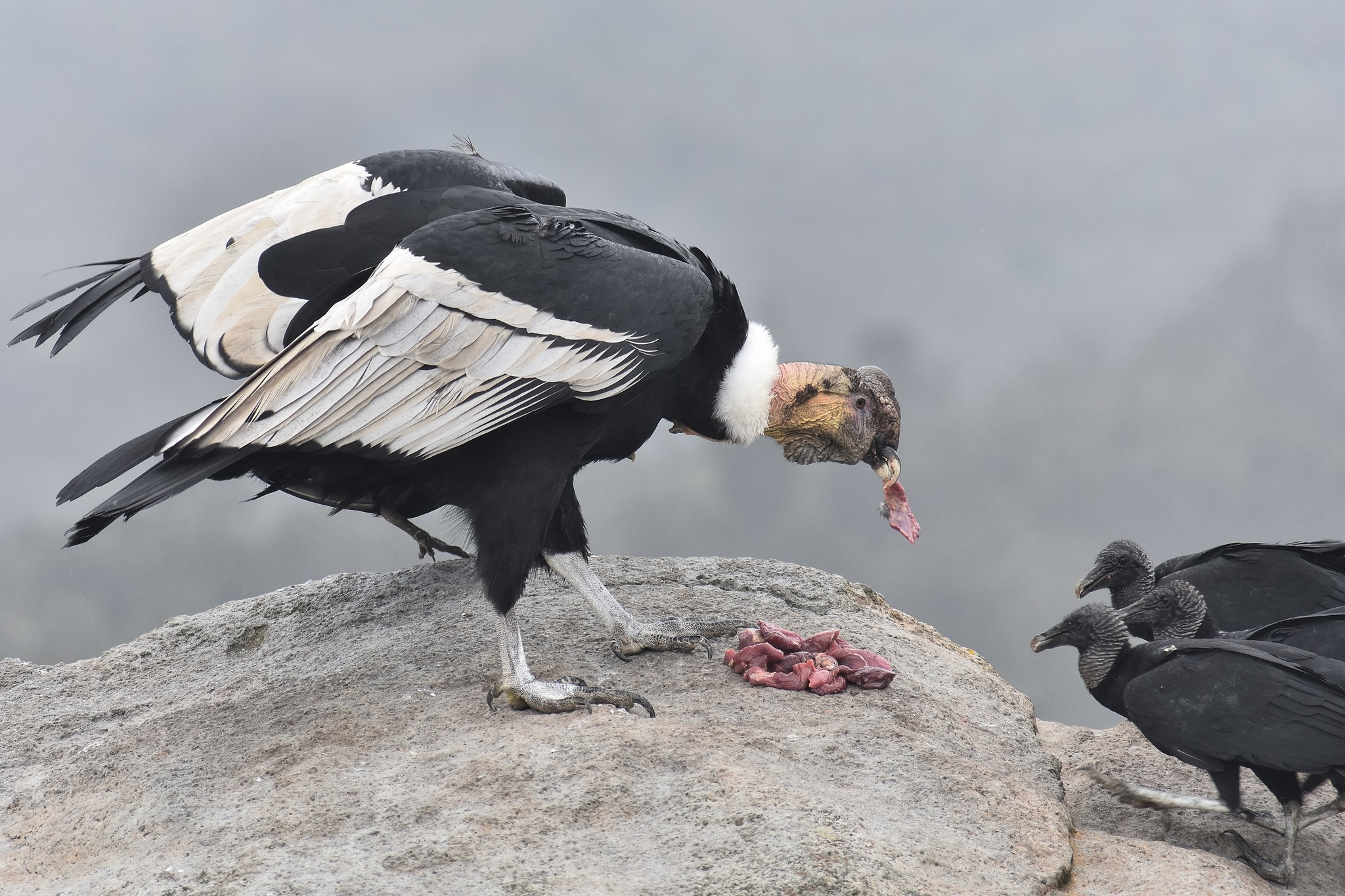
Adult male, with black vultures

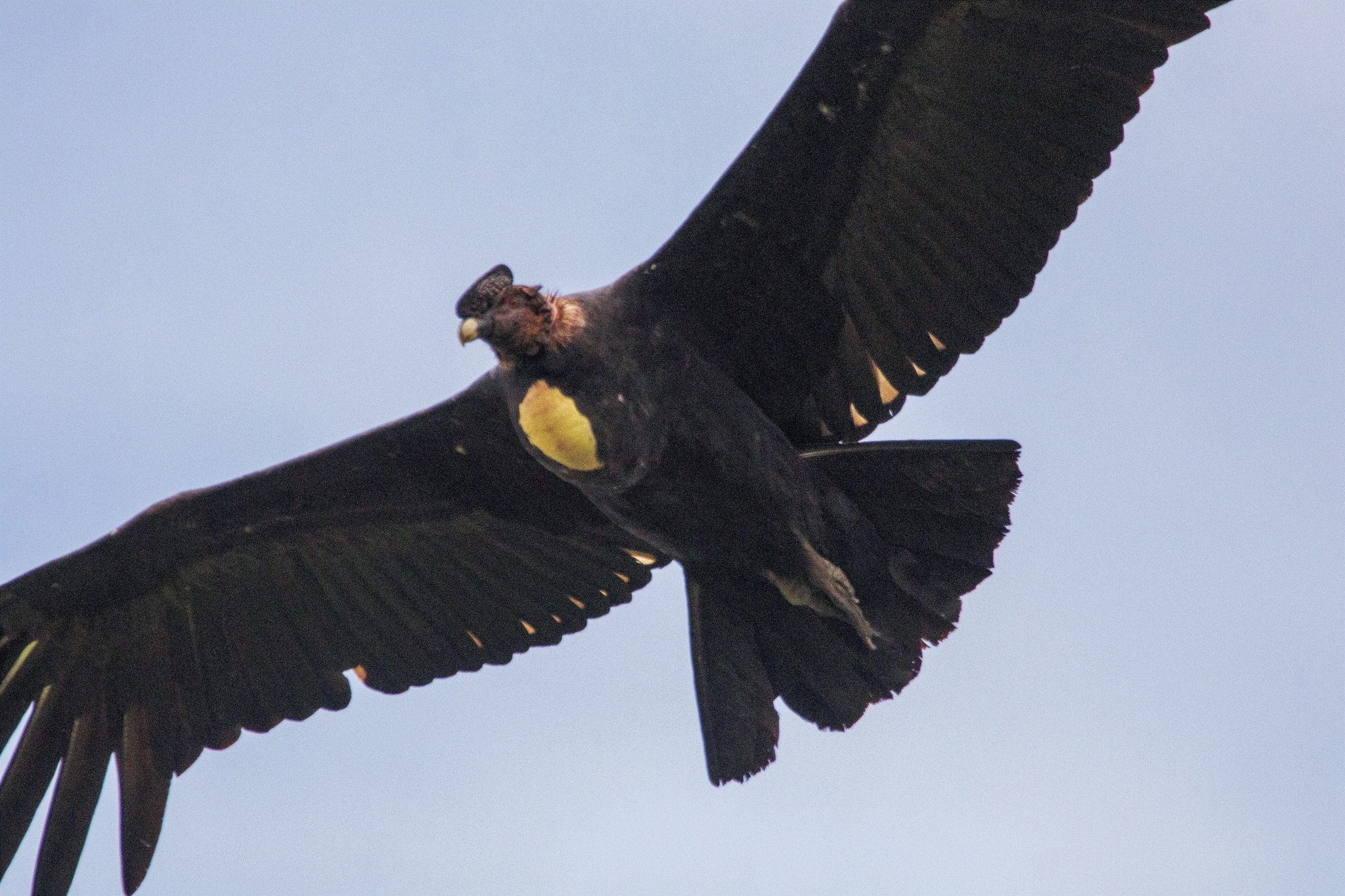
Adult male with a full crop

The Andean condor is a scavenger, feeding mainly on carrion. Wild condors inhabit large territories, often traveling more than 200 km (120 mi) a day in search of carrion. In inland areas, they prefer large carcasses. Naturally, they feed on the largest carcasses available, which can include llamas (Lama glama), alpacas (Lama pacos), rheas (Rhea ssp.), guanacos (Lama guanicoe), deer and armadillos. Wild individuals could acquire extra carotenoids from vegetal matter contained in carcass viscera and fresh vegetation. However, most inland condors now live largely off of domestic animals, which are now more widespread in South America, such as cattle (Bos taurus), horses (Equus caballus), donkeys (Equus asinus), mules, sheep (Ovis aries), domestic pigs (Sus domesticus), domestic goats (Capra hircus) and dogs (Canis familiaris). They also feed on the carcasses of introduced game species such as wild boar (Sus scrofa), rabbits (Oryctolagus cuniculus), foxes (Vulpes vulpes) and red deer (Cervus elaphus). For condors who live around the coast, the diet consists mainly of beached carcasses of marine mammals, largely cetaceans. They will also raid the nests of smaller birds to feed on the eggs. Andean condors have been observed to do some hunting of small, live animals, such as rodents, birds and rabbits, which (given their lack of powerful, grasping feet or developed hunting technique) they usually kill by jabbing repeatedly with their bill.

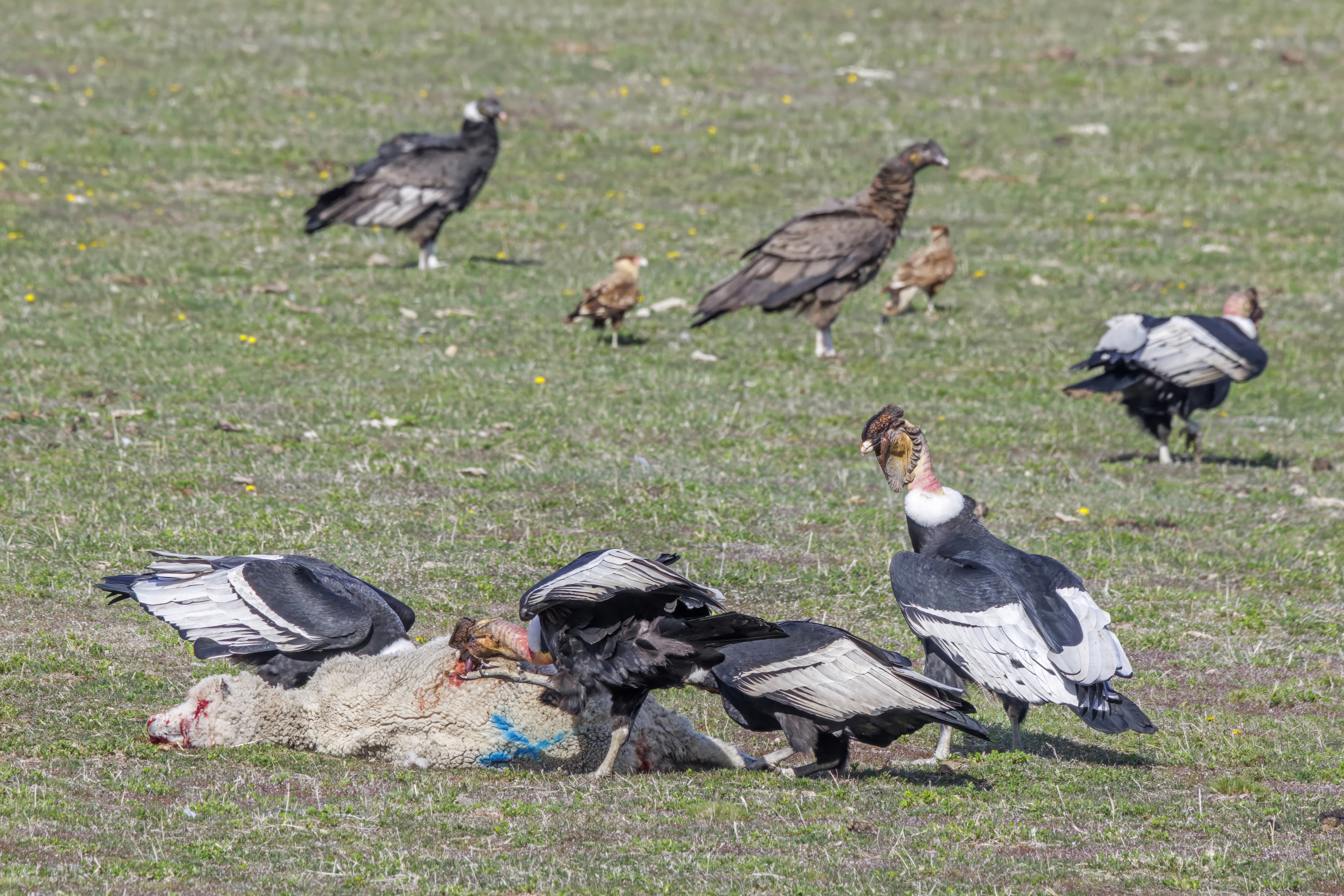
Males feeding on a sheep carcass, in Chile. Two crested caracaras in the background by an immature male.

Coastal areas provide a constant food supply, and in particularly plentiful areas, some Andean condors limit their foraging area to several kilometers of beach-front land. They locate carrion by spotting it or by following other scavengers, such as corvids or other vultures. It may follow New World vultures of the genus Cathartes—the turkey vulture (C. aura), the lesser yellow-headed vulture (C. burrovianus), and the greater yellow-headed vulture (C. melambrotus)—to carcasses. The Cathartes vultures forage by smell, detecting the scent of ethyl mercaptan, a gas produced by the beginnings of decay in dead animals. These smaller vultures cannot rip through the tougher hides of these larger animals with the efficiency of the larger condor, and their interactions are often an example of mutual dependence between species. However, studies have indicated that Andean condors are fairly proficient at searching out carrion without needing to rely on other scavengers to guide them to it. Black vultures (Coragyps atratus) and several mammalian carnivorous scavengers such as foxes may sometimes track Cathartes vultures for carcasses or compete with condors over available carrion but the condor is invariably dominant among the scavengers in its range. A study in Patagonia found surprisingly that condors were driving the ecology of puma (Puma concolor) in the area, apparently by routinely commandeering the powerful cat's kills (often the day following the puma's nighttime kills). It is projected that the condors were able to engage in harassment of the pumas despite the large cat's size and power, and have apparently driven the pumas to increase their kill rate and accommodate for their frequent losses to the scavengers. Andean condors are intermittent eaters in the wild, often going for a few days without eating, then gorging themselves on several pounds at once, sometimes to the point of being unable to lift off the ground. Because its feet and talons are not adapted to grasping, it must feed while on the ground. Like other carrion-feeders, it plays an important role in its ecosystem by disposing of carrion which would otherwise be a breeding ground for disease.

Andean condors can efficiently absorb a wide variety of carotenoid pigments from the vegetal matter within the viscera that they consume from carcasses. These include carotenoids such as β-carotene and echineone. The pigments result in the yellow skin colouration of adult males and their ability to flush their skin a brilliant yellow during contests for dominance, as well as the colour of the iris and bright orange tongues of both sexes. Captive Andean condors have a lower concentration of carotenoid pigments in their bodies than wild condors, likely because the diet of captive condors is usually restricted to just flesh. An analysis of the droppings of wild condors found that 90% contained vegetal remains, and of those that contained vegetal remains, 35% of them were composed of primarily vegetal matter (around 80% by volume). The potential sources for the vegetal matter is posited to include the viscera of herbivore carcasses as well as fresh vegetation.

=== Longevity ===
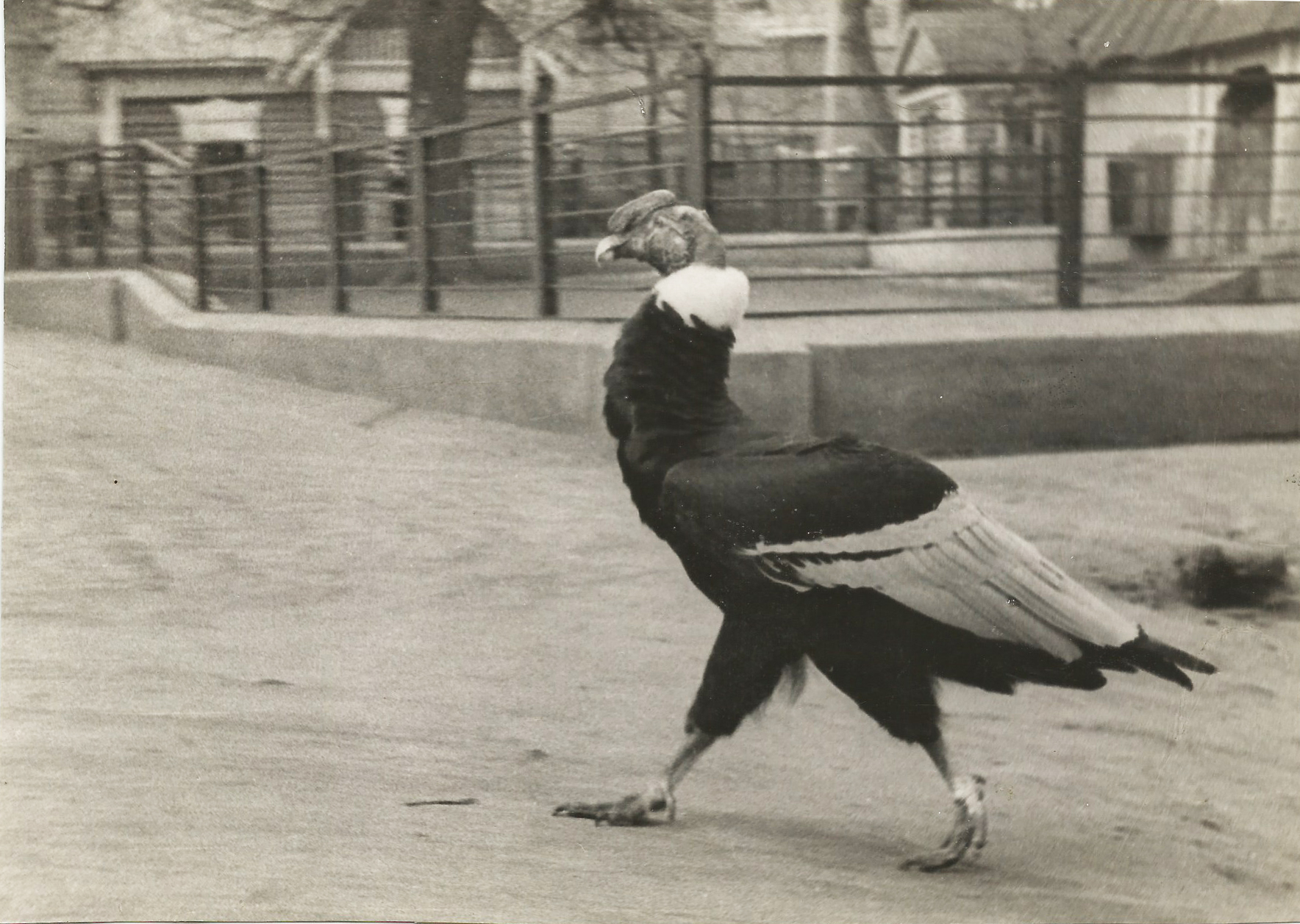
1940 photo of an adult male named Kuzya. He lived at the Moscow Zoo from 1892 to 1963 (72 years)

Being a slowly-maturing bird with no known natural predators in adulthood, an Andean condor is a long-lived bird. Longevity and mortality rates are not known to have been extensively studied in the wild. Some estimations of lifespans of wild birds have exceeded 50 years. In 1983, the Guinness Book of World Records considered the longest-lived bird of any species with a confirmed lifespan was a male Andean condor named Kuzya that died after living 72 years in captivity, having been captured from the wild as a juvenile of undetermined age. Several species of parrot have been reported to live for perhaps over 100 years in captivity, but these (at least in 1983) were not considered authenticated. Another early captive-held specimen of condor reportedly lived for 71 years. However, these lifespans have been exceeded by a male, nicknamed "Thaao", who was kept at Beardsley Zoo in Connecticut. Thaao was born in captivity in 1930 and died on January 26, 2010, at the age of 79. This is the greatest verified age ever known for a bird.

== Relationship with humans ==
=== Conservation status ===
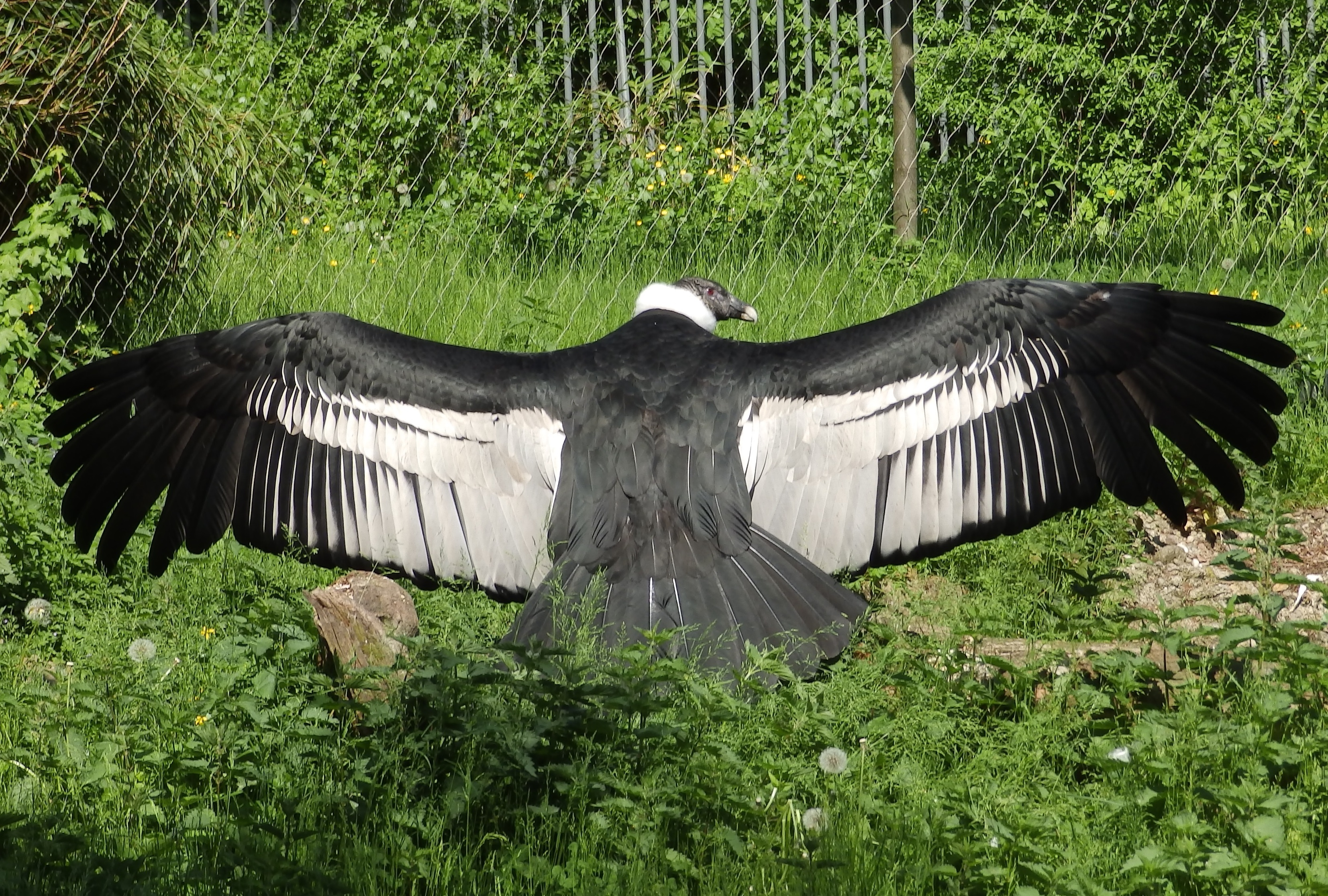
Female dorsal view, at the Berlin Zoo

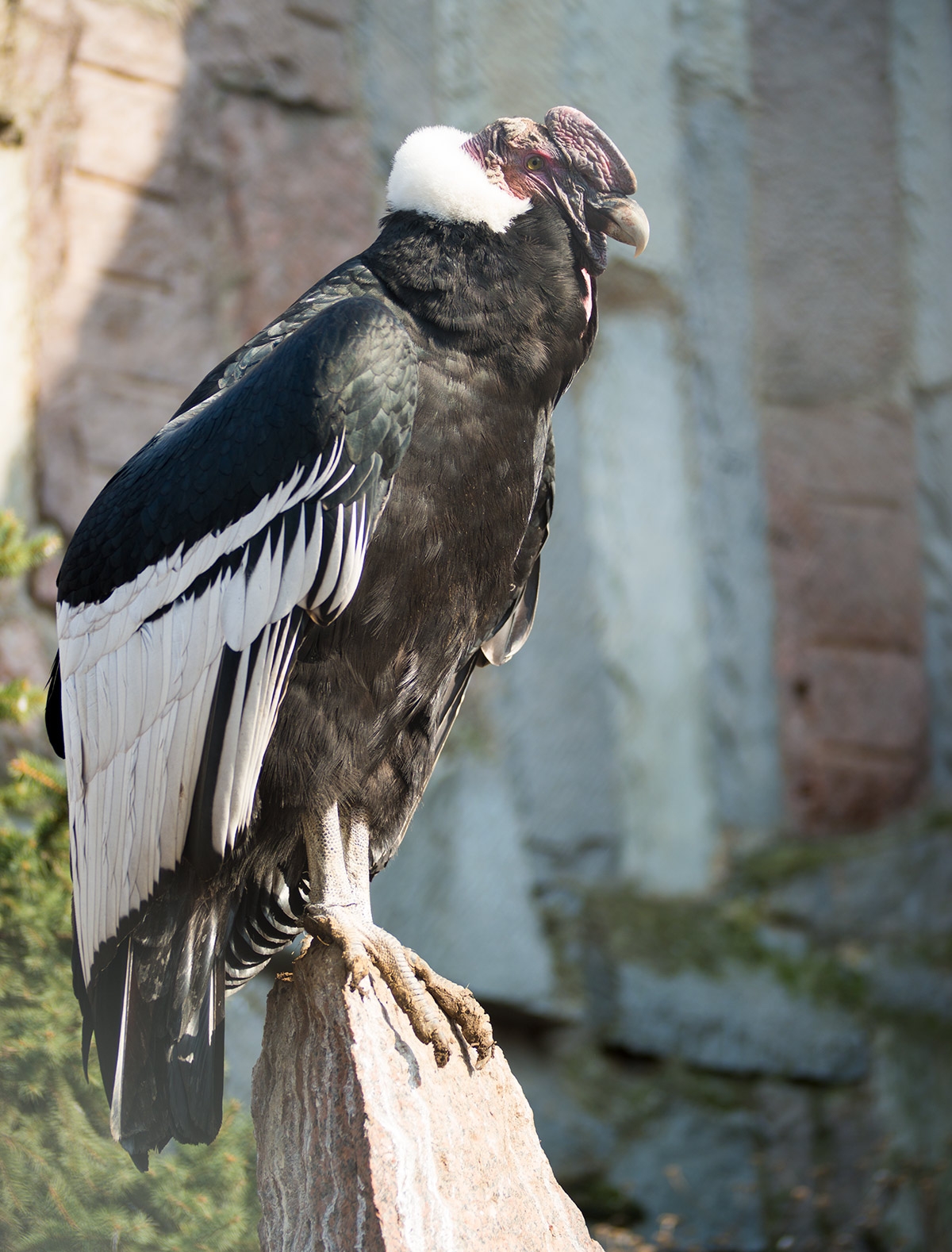
Male, at the Moscow Zoo, Russia

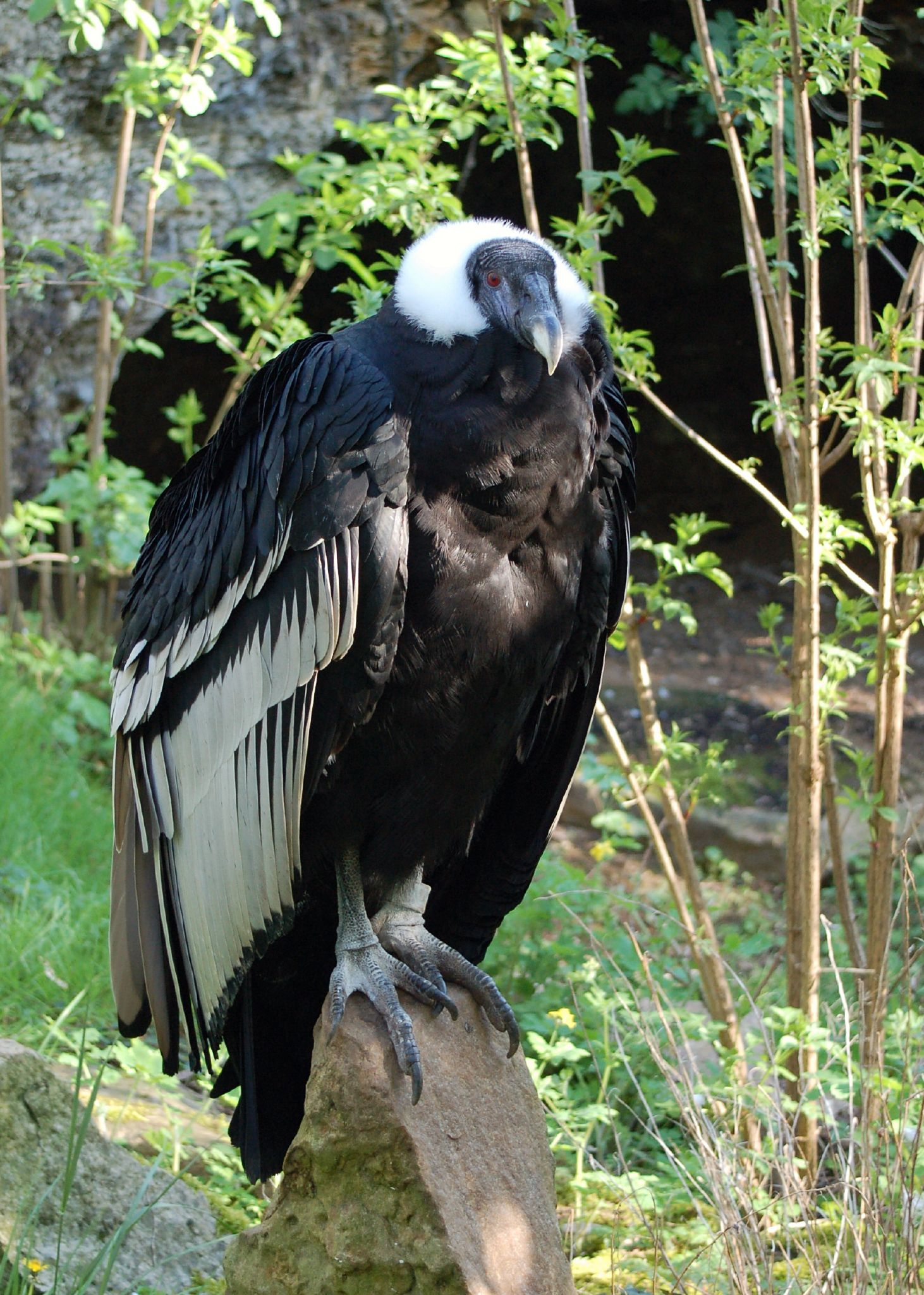
Female at the Doué-la-Fontaine Zoo, France

The Andean condor is considered vulnerable by the IUCN and the Peruvian Conservation Organization. As a result of research on its plight, its status was changed to Vulnerable from Near Threatened in 2020, and only about 10,000 individuals remain. It was first placed on the United States Endangered Species list in 1970, a status which is assigned to an animal that is in danger of extinction throughout all or a significant portion of its range. Threats to its population include loss of habitat needed for foraging, secondary poisoning from animals killed by hunters and persecution. It is threatened mainly in the northern area of its range, and is extremely rare in Venezuela and Colombia, where it has undergone considerable declines in recent years. Because it is adapted to very low mortality and has correspondingly low reproductive rates, it is extremely vulnerable to human persecution, most of which stems from the fact that it is perceived as a threat by farmers due to alleged attacks on livestock. Education programs have been implemented by conservationists to dispel this misconception. Reintroduction programs using captive-bred Andean condors, which release birds hatched in North American zoos into the wild to bolster populations, have been introduced in Argentina, Venezuela, and Colombia. The first captive-bred Andean condors were released into the wild in 1989. When raising condors, human contact is minimal; chicks are fed with glove puppets which resemble adult Andean condors to prevent the chicks from imprinting on humans, which would endanger them upon release as they would not be wary of humans. The condors are kept in aviaries for three months prior to release, where they acclimatize to an environment similar to that which they will be released in. Released condors are tracked by satellite to observe their movements and to monitor whether they are still alive.

In response to the capture of all the wild individuals of the California condor, in 1988 the US Fish and Wildlife Service began a reintroduction experiment involving the release of captive Andean condors into the wild in California. Only females were released to prevent it becoming an invasive species. The experiment was a success, and all the Andean condors were recaptured and re-released in South America before the reintroduction of the California condors took place.

=== Role in culture ===
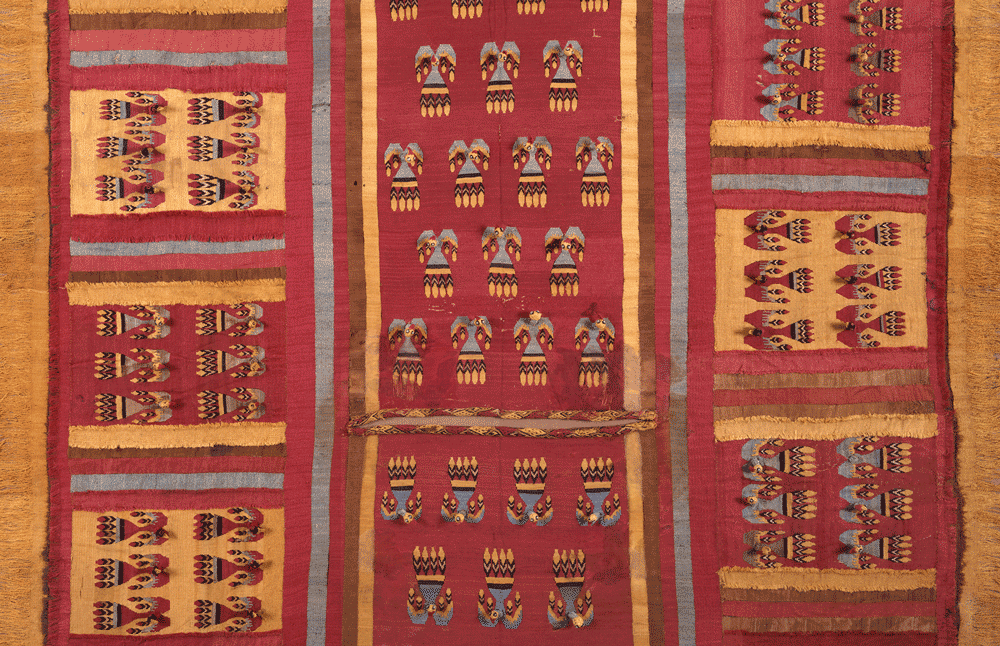
Chancay textile with flying condors, 1200-1400 AD

The Andean condor is a national symbol of Argentina, Bolivia, Chile, Colombia, Ecuador, Peru and Venezuelan Andes states. It is the national bird of Bolivia, Chile, Colombia, and Ecuador. It plays an important role in the folklore and mythology of the South American Andean regions, and has been represented in Andean art from c. 2500 BCE onward, and it is a part of indigenous Andean religions. In Andean mythology, the Andean condor was associated with the sun deity, and was believed to be the ruler of the upper world. The Andean condor is considered a symbol of power and health by many Andean cultures, and it was believed that the bones and organs of the Andean condor possessed medicinal powers, sometimes leading to the hunting and killing of condors to obtain its bones and organs. In some versions of Peruvian bullfighting ("Yawar Fiesta" or "Blood Festival"), a condor is tied to the back of a bull, where it pecks at the animal as bullfighters fight it. The condor generally survives and is set free.

The Andean condor is a popular figure on stamps in many countries, appearing on one for Ecuador in 1958, Argentina in 1960, Peru in 1973, Bolivia in 1985, Colombia in 1992, Chile in 1935 and 2001, and Venezuela in 2004. It has also appeared on the coins and banknotes of Colombia and Chile.

National coat of arms
Coat of arms of Bolivia.

Coat of arms of Chile.

Coat of arms of Colombia.

Coat of arms of Ecuador.

First Coat of arms of Peru.

Former coat of arms of Venezuela.
Others coat of arms
Coat of arms of State of Mérida, Venezuela.

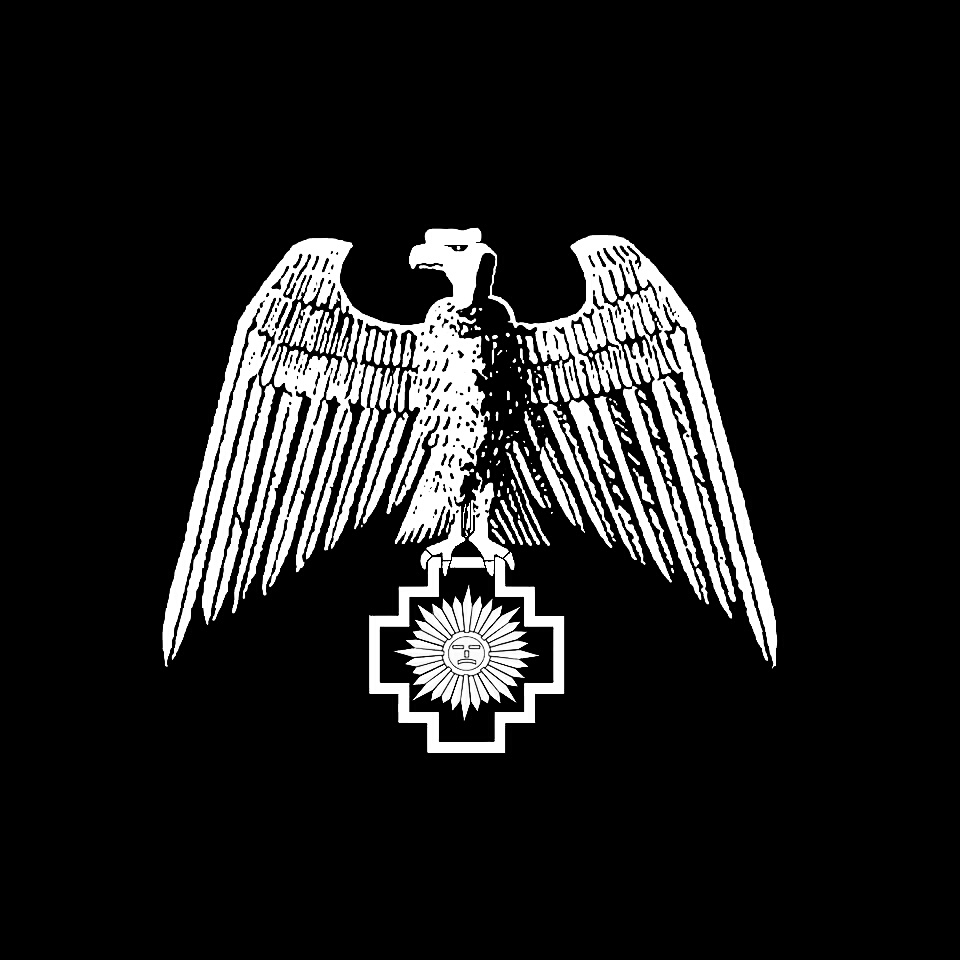
Imperial standard of the Ethnocacerist Movement, Peru.

National Autonomous University of Mexico, depicting a condor and golden eagle.
Condor in popular culture
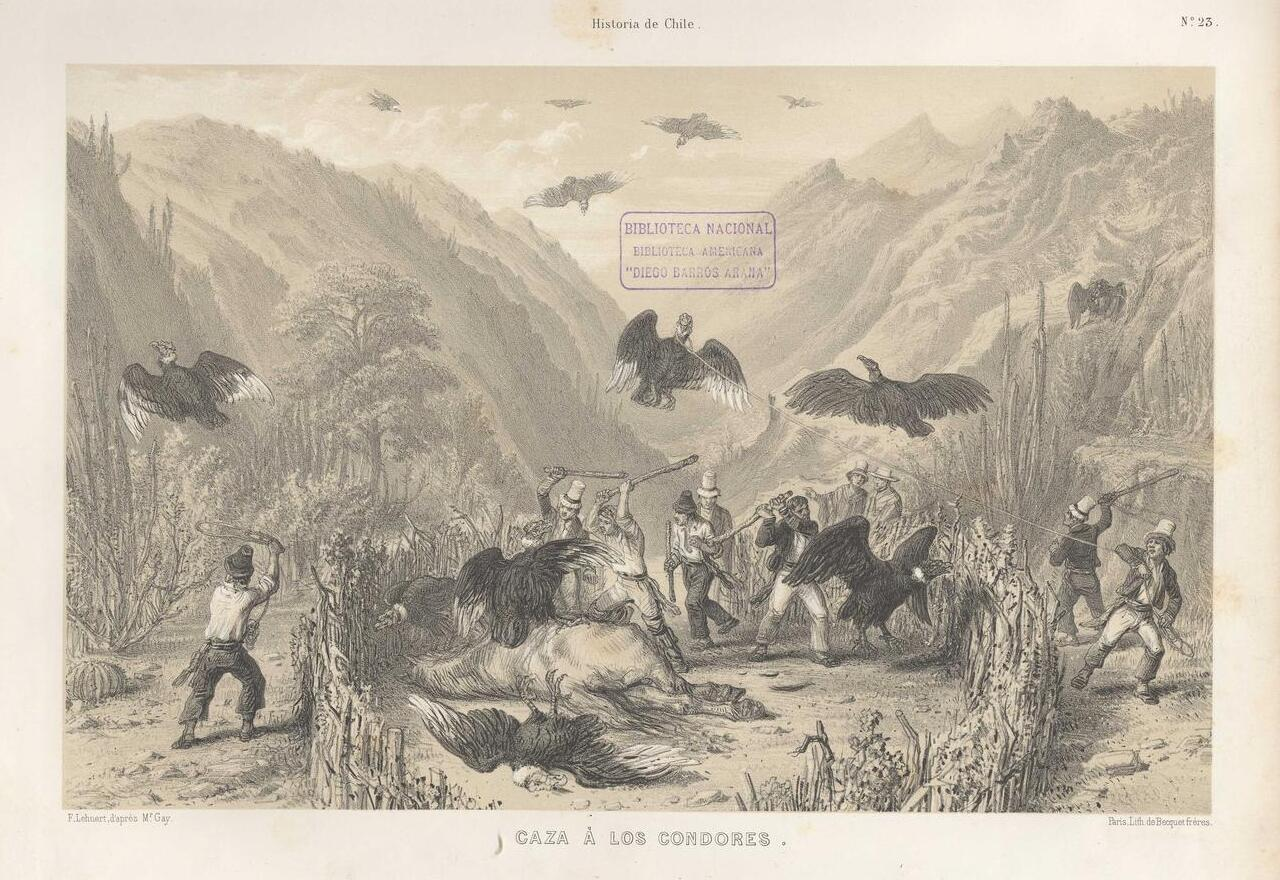
Hunting for condor. Chile, 1854.

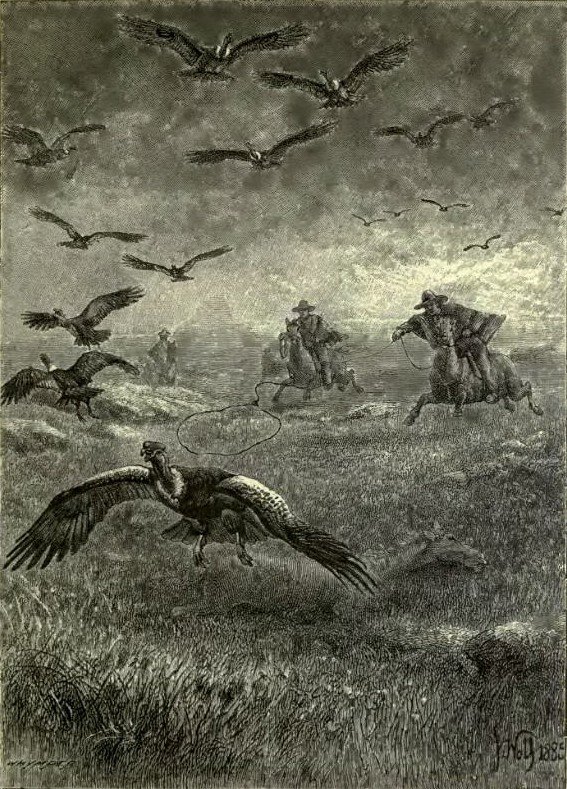
Argentine gauchos lassoing a condor, 1895.

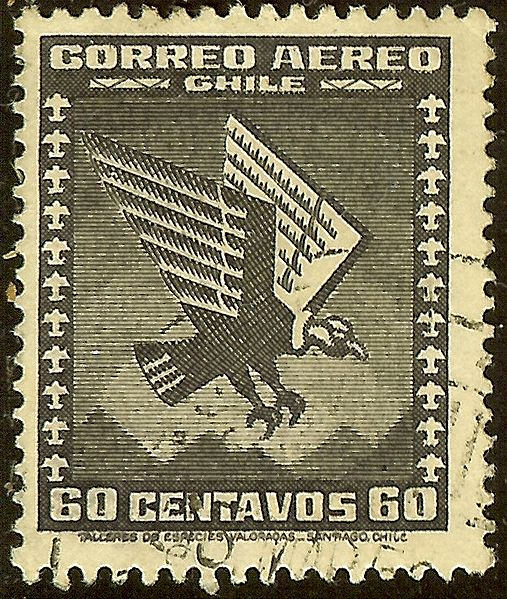
Chilean 60-centavo air mail stamp, 1935.

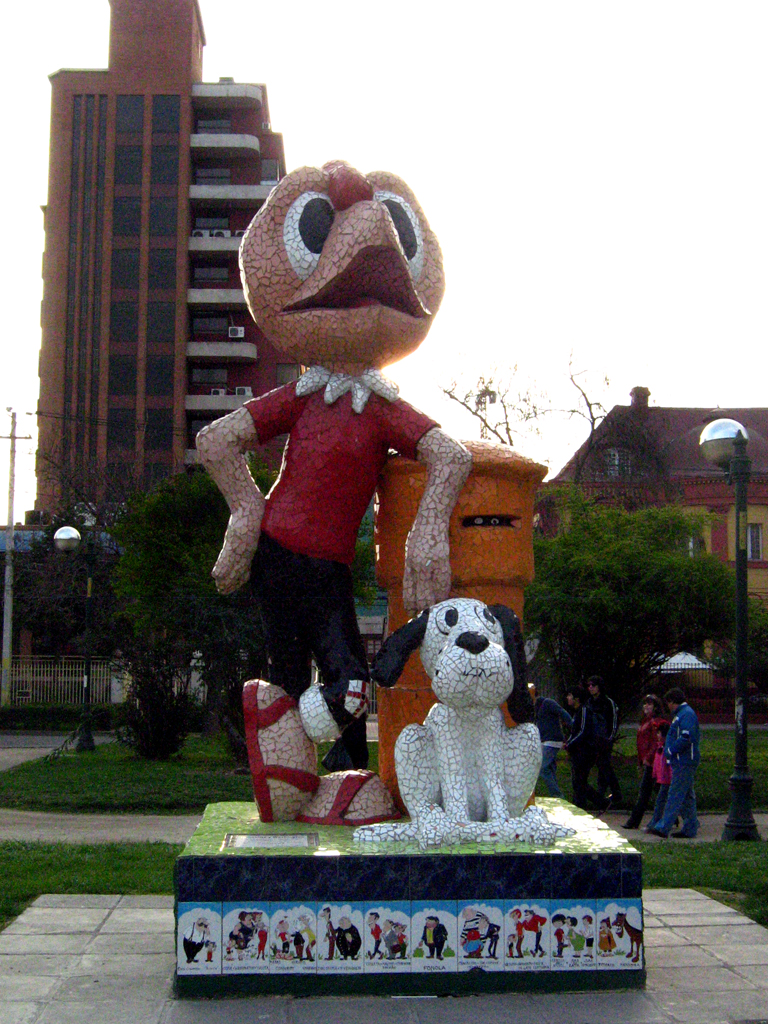
Condorito, a Chilean comic book character.

Brazilian Carlos Gomes composed the opera "Condor" premiered in 1863 at Teatro alla Scala in Milan. In 1913. Peruvian songwriter Daniel Alomía Robles composed the zarzuela "El Cóndor Pasa", and the song was first performed publicly at the Teatro Mazzi in Lima.
