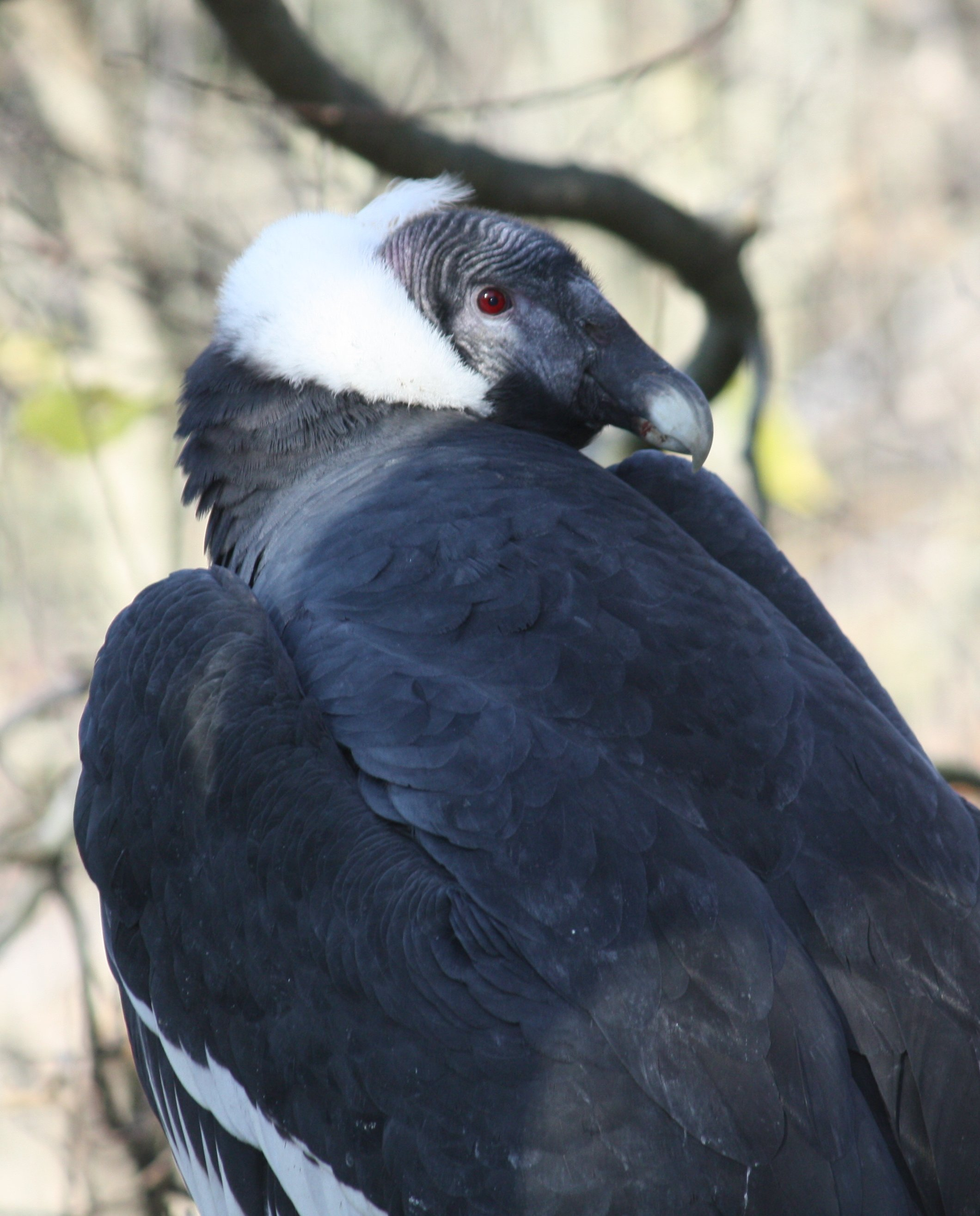
- Andean condor (Vultur gryphus)

Scientific classification
- Kingdom: Animalia
- Phylum: Chordata
- Class: Aves
- Order: Accipitriformes
- Family: Cathartidae
- Genus: Vultur; Linnaeus, 1758

Type species
- Vultur gryphus Linnaeus, 1758

Species
- Vultur gryphus (Andean condor); †Vultur messii

= Vultur =

Vultur Temporal range: Early Pliocene - Recent

Genus of birds

Vultur is a genus of New World vulture that contains two species, an extant species, the Andean condor (Vultur gryphus) and the fossil species Vultur messii from the early Pliocene of Argentina.
