= Vultur messii =

Vultur messii Temporal range: Early Pliocene

Scientific classification
- Kingdom: Animalia
- Phylum: Chordata
- Class: Aves
- Order: Accipitriformes
- Family: Cathartidae
- Genus: Vultur
- Species: †V. messii

Binomial name
- †Vultur messii Degrange et al., 2023

Extinct species of bird

Vultur messii is an extinct species of Vultur that inhabited South America during the Pliocene epoch.
