= Yellow-headed vulture =

Yellow-headed vulture may refer to two vulture species in the genus Cathartes. They were considered one species until they were split in 1964:

- Lesser yellow-headed vulture, Cathartes burrovianus
- Greater yellow-headed vulture, Cathartes melambrotus
