= Cathartes emsliei =

Cathartes emsliei Temporal range: Late Quaternary

Scientific classification
- Kingdom: Animalia
- Phylum: Chordata
- Class: Aves
- Order: Accipitriformes
- Family: Cathartidae
- Genus: Cathartes
- Species: C. emsliei

Binomial name
- Cathartes emsliei Suárez & Olson, 2020

Extinct species of bird

Cathartes emsliei, Emslie's vulture, is an extinct species of vulture in the family Cathartidae. It is only known from a series of fossils found in western Cuba. The fossils were primarily found in caves or Quaternary asphalt deposits. It is significantly smaller than the extant C. aura. It likely became extinct during the Holocene following the extinction of Cuban Pleistocene megafauna whose bodies it would have fed on, coupled with the loss of the open savannas it would have inhabited.

Both its common and scientific names are named for Dr. Steven Emslie, a professor of paleontology at UNC Wilmington.
