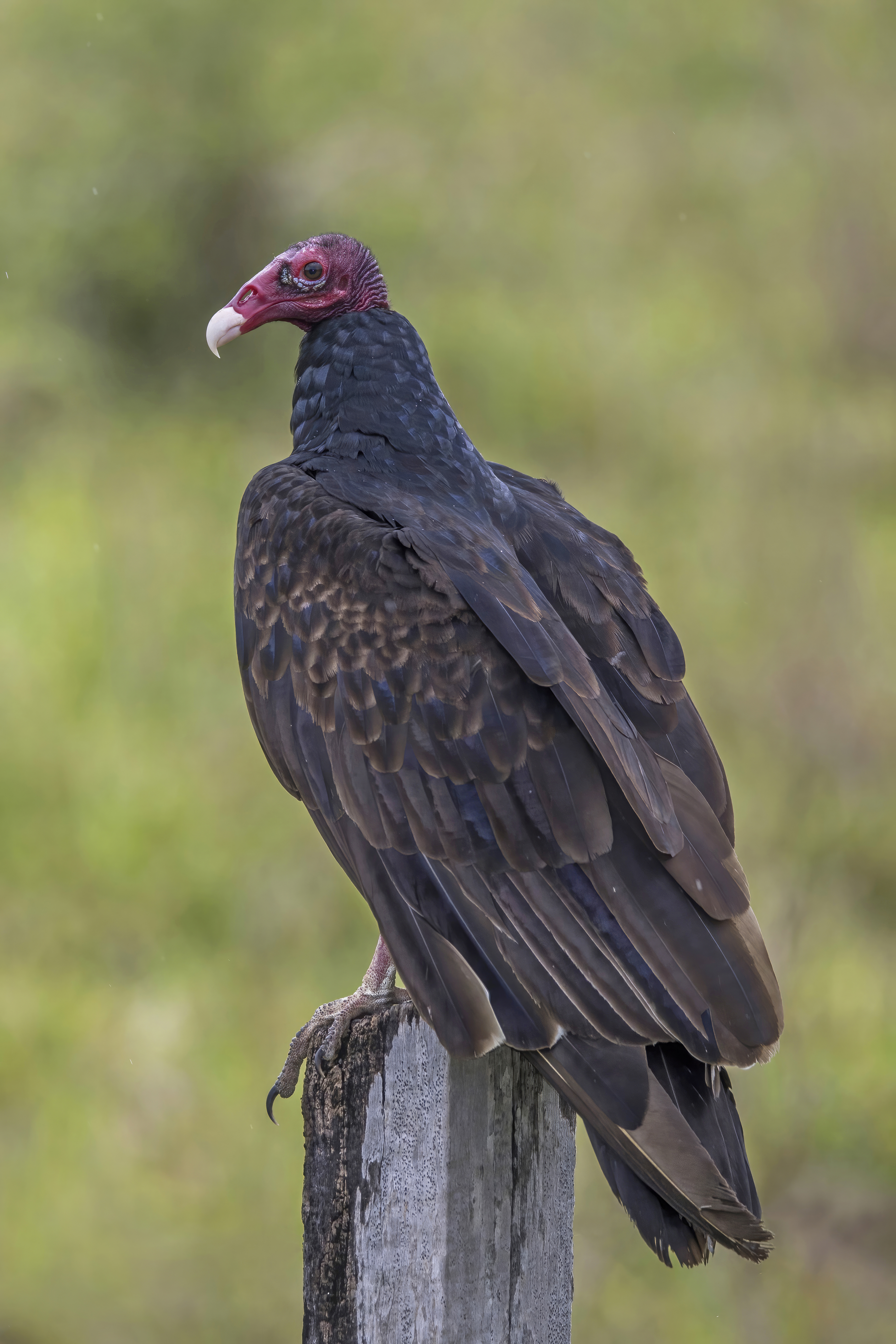
- C. a. aura Orange Walk District, Belize

Conservation status
- Least Concern (IUCN 3.1)

Scientific classification
- Kingdom: Animalia
- Phylum: Chordata
- Class: Aves
- Order: Cathartiformes
- Family: Cathartidae
- Genus: Cathartes
- Species: C. aura

Binomial name
- Cathartes aura (Linnaeus, 1758)
- Range of C. aura Summer only range Year-round range

Synonyms
- Vultur aura Linnaeus, 1758

= Turkey vulture =

Turkey vulture Temporal range: Pleistocene–present

Most widespread New World vulture

The turkey vulture (Cathartes aura) is the most widespread of the New World vultures. One of three species in the genus Cathartes of the family Cathartidae, the turkey vulture ranges from southern Canada to the southernmost tip of South America. It inhabits a variety of open and semi-open areas, including subtropical forests, shrublands, pastures, and deserts.

Like all New World vultures, it is not closely related to the Old World vultures of Europe, Africa, and Asia. However, the two groups strongly resemble each other due to convergent evolution.

The turkey vulture is a scavenger and feeds almost exclusively on carrion. It finds its food using its keen eyes and sense of smell, flying low enough to detect the gasses produced by the early stages of decay in dead animals. In flight, it uses thermals to move through the air, flapping its wings infrequently. It roosts in large community groups. Lacking a syrinx—the vocal organ of birds—its only vocalizations are grunts or low hisses. It nests in caves, hollow trees, or thickets. Each year it generally raises two chicks, which it feeds by regurgitation. It has very few natural predators. In the United States, the vulture receives legal protection under the Migratory Bird Treaty Act of 1918.

== Names ==
It is also known in some North American regions as a "buzzard" or "turkey buzzard," which in the Old World instead refers to members of the genus Buteo. In some areas of the Caribbean it is known as the "John crow" or "carrion crow."

== Taxonomy ==
The turkey vulture received its common name from the resemblance of the adult's bald red head and dark plumage to that of the male wild turkey. "Vulture" is from the Latin vulturus ("tearer"), describing its feeding habits. The word buzzard is used by some North Americans to refer to this bird; in the Old World that term refers to members of the genus Buteo. The turkey vulture was first formally described by Carl Linnaeus as Vultur aura in his 1758 10th edition of Systema Naturae, and characterised as "V. fuscogriseus, remigibus nigris, rostro albo" ("brown-gray vulture, with black wing flight feathers and a white beak"). It is a member of the family Cathartidae, along with the other six species of New World vultures, and included in the genus Cathartes, along with the greater yellow-headed vulture and the lesser yellow-headed vulture. Like other New World vultures, the turkey vulture has a diploid chromosome number of 80.

The taxonomic placement of the turkey vulture and the remaining six species of New World vultures has been in flux. Though they are similar in appearance and have similar ecological roles, the New World and Old World vultures evolved in different parts of the world and from different ancestors. Some earlier authorities suggested that the New World vultures were more closely related to storks. More recent authorities maintained their overall position in the order Accipitiformes along with the Old World vultures or placed them in their own order, Cathartiformes.

However, recent genetic studies indicate that neither New World nor Old World vultures are close to falcons, nor are New World vultures close to storks. Both are basal members of the clade Afroaves, with Old World vultures comprising several groups within the family Accipitridae, also containing eagles, kites, and hawks, while New World vultures in Cathartiformes are a sister group to Accipitriformes (containing the osprey and secretarybird along with Accipitridae).

== Distribution and habitat ==
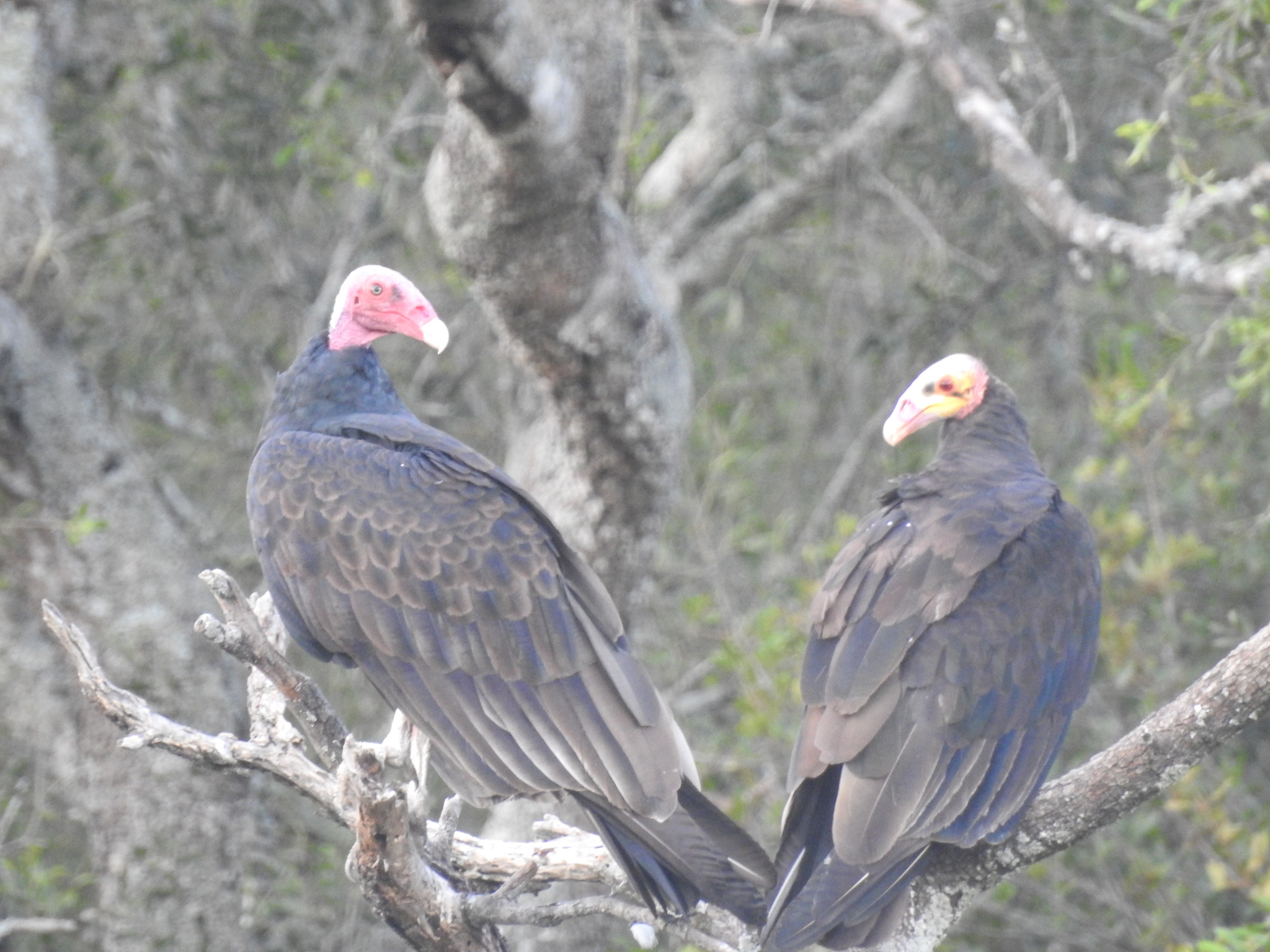
With a lesser yellow-headed vulture, in Formosa, Argentina

The turkey vulture has a large range, with an estimated global occurrence of 28,000,000 km^{2} (11,000,000 sq mi). It is the most widely distributed vulture in the Americas and rivals its cousin the black vulture as the most abundant raptorial bird worldwide. Its global population is estimated to be 18,000,000 individuals. It is found in open and semi-open areas throughout the Americas from southern Canada to Cape Horn. It is a permanent resident in the southern United States, though northern birds may migrate as far south as South America.

The turkey vulture is widespread over nearly all American habitats but they tend to show particular habitat preferences. It is most commonly found in relatively open areas which juxtapose with woodland, which are important both for nesting and roosting. Furthermore, turkey vultures in North America generally avoid enclosed forested areas that may hamper their ability to take flight and tend to often favor hill or low mountainous areas that make catching flight easier with less effort. This species can be seen over open country, including grasslands but are often absent from completely treeless areas such as some parts of the prairies or Great Plains. Additionally, they may adapt to tropical and subtropical forests, shrublands, deserts and semi-desert, wetlands and foothills. Evidence indicates agricultural land is key habitat for turkey vultures, mainly pastureland or other low-input farmland for foraging and roosting but they tend to only occur ephemerally as flyovers around row-crop type agriculture. Other manmade habitats can be used, with the species regularly seen over urban areas throughout its range, though they tend to use them more when not breeding, being unable to nest without appropriate habitats, and do not occur as an urban bird nearly as routinely as do black vultures in the tropics and subtropics.

This bird with its crow-like aspect gave foot to the naming of the Quebrada de los Cuervos (Crows Ravine) in Uruguay, where they dwell together with the lesser yellow-headed vulture and the black vulture.

== Subspecies ==
There are five subspecies of turkey vulture:

Image	Subspecies	Common name	Description	Distribution
	C. a. aura Linnaeus, 1758	Antillean turkey vulture	The nominate subspecies. Occasionally overlaps its range with other subspecies. The smallest of the subspecies, but nearly indistinguishable from C. a. meridionalis in color.	From Mexico south through South America and the Greater Antilles.
	C. a. jota Molina, GI 1782	Chilean turkey vulture	Larger, browner, and slightly paler than C. a. ruficollis. Secondary feathers and wing coverts may have gray margins.	It is found all the way to the Andes in Colombia, all the way to southern Argentina.
	C. a. meridionalis Swann, 1921	Western turkey vulture	A synonym for C. a. teter. C. a. teter was identified as a subspecies by Friedman in 1933, but in 1964 Alexander Wetmore separated the western birds, which took the name meridionalis, which was applied earlier to a migrant from South America.	Breeds from southern Manitoba, southern British Columbia, central Alberta and Saskatchewan south to Baja California, south-central Arizona, southeastern New Mexico, and south-central Texas. It is the most migratory subspecies, migrating as far as South America, where it overlaps the range of the smaller C. a. aura. It differs from the eastern turkey vulture in color, as the edges of the lesser wing coverts are darker brown and narrower.
	C. a. ruficollis Spix, 1824	Tropical turkey vulture	Darker and more black than C. a. aura, with brown wing edgings which are narrower or absent altogether. Head and neck are dull red with yellow-white or green-white markings. Adults generally have a pale yellow patch on the crown of the head.	Found in Panama south through Uruguay and Argentina. It is also found on the island of Trinidad.
	C. a. septentrionalis Wied-Neuwied, 1839	Eastern turkey vulture	Eastern and western turkey vultures differ in tail and wing proportions. It is less migratory than C. a. meridionalis and rarely migrates to areas south of the United States.	From southeastern Canada south through the eastern United States.

== Description ==
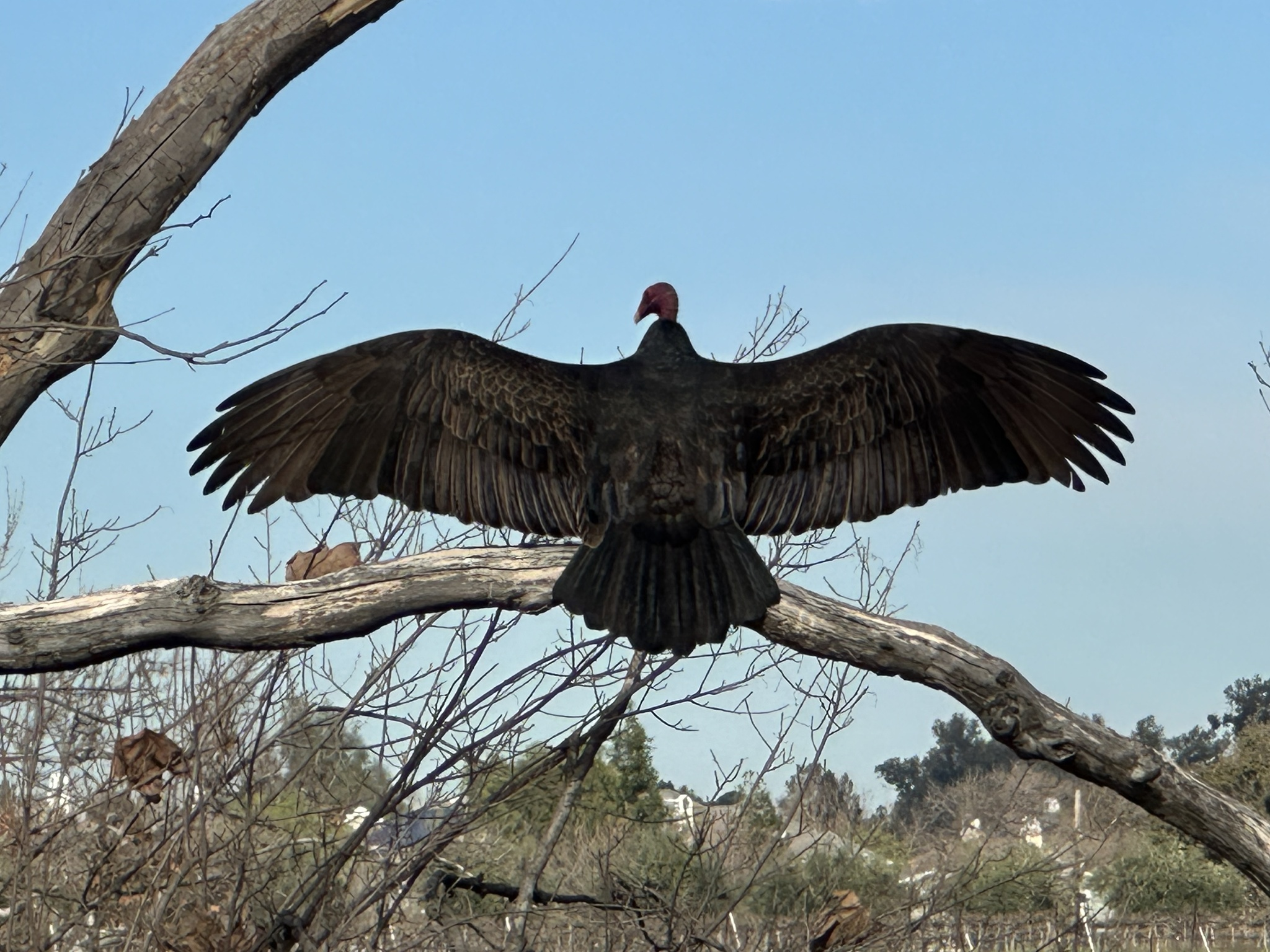
Showing wingspan, in California

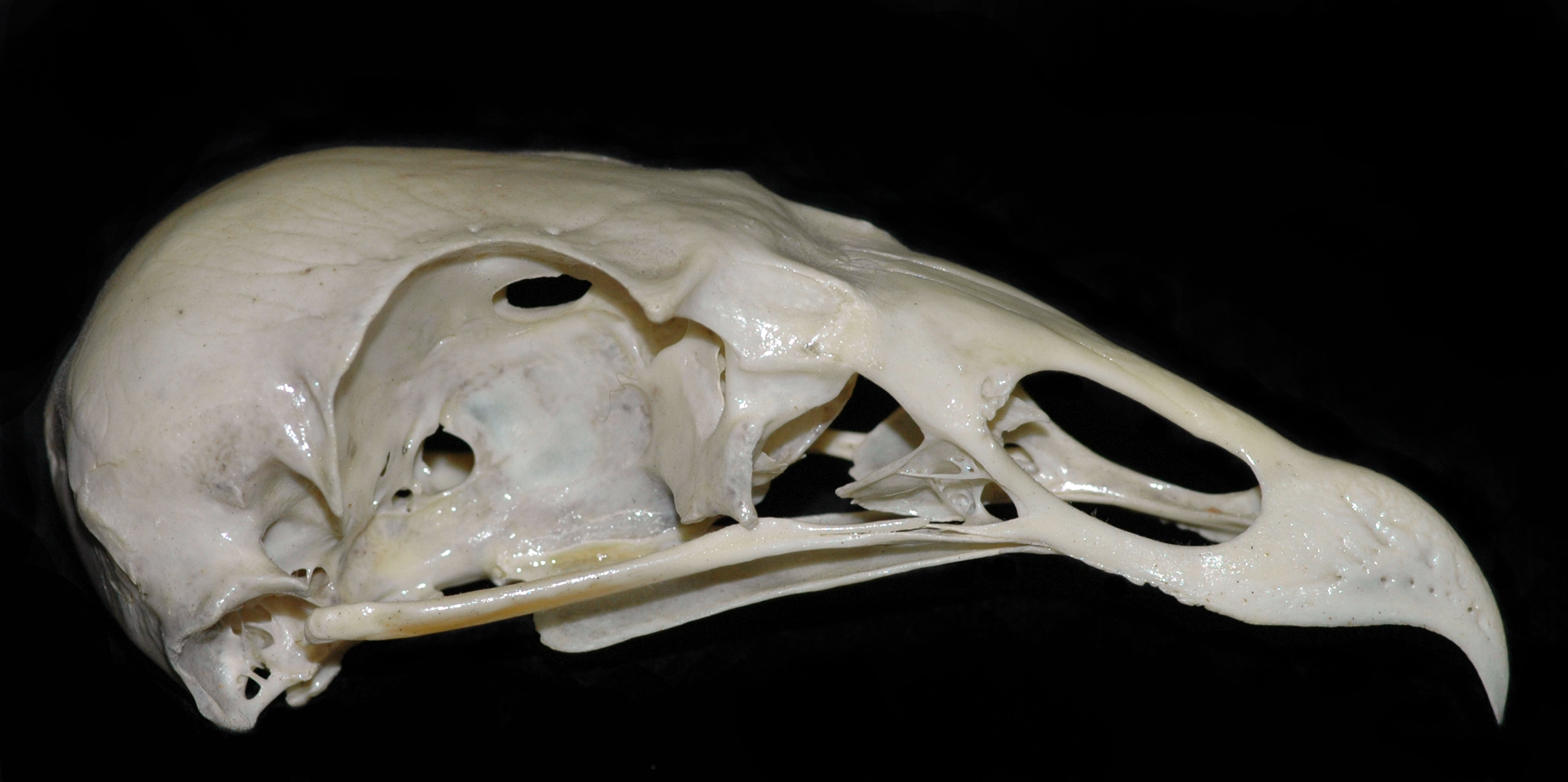
Skull of a turkey vulture

Sounds of a turkey vulture

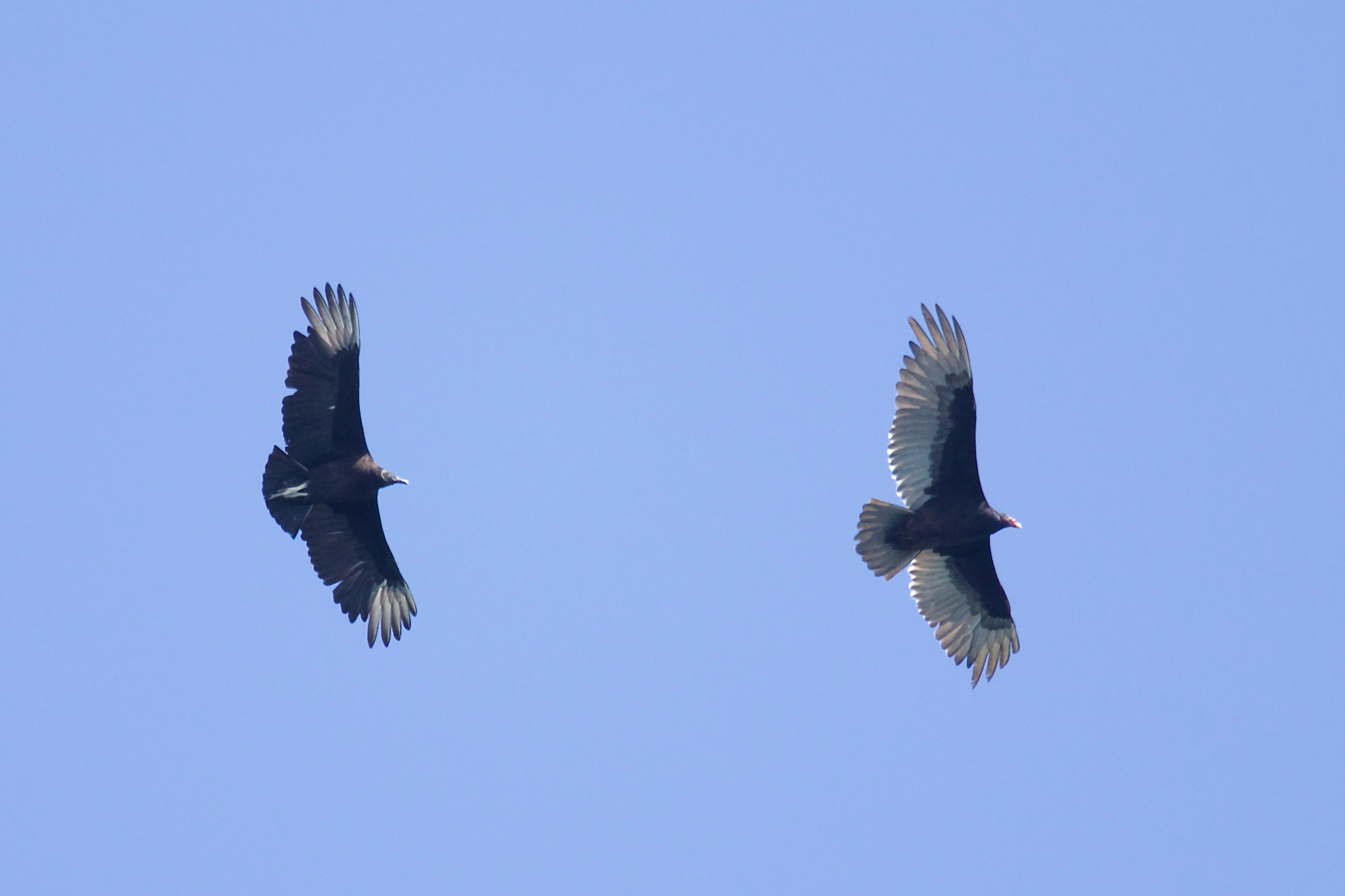
Black vulture (left) with turkey vulture (right), in Toronto

A large bird, it has a wingspan of 1.5–2 m (4.9–6.6 ft) a length of 62–81 cm (24–32 in), and weight of 0.8 to 2.41 kg (1.8 to 5.3 lb). Birds in the northern limit of the species' range average larger in size than the vulture from the neotropics. 124 birds from Florida averaged 2 kg (4.4 lb) while 65 and 130 birds from Venezuela were found to average 1.22 and 1.45 kg (2.7 and 3.2 lb), respectively. It displays minimal sexual dimorphism; sexes are identical in plumage and in coloration, and are similar in size. The body feathers are mostly brownish-black, but the flight feathers on the wings appear to be silvery-gray beneath, contrasting with the darker wing linings. The adult's head is small in proportion to its body and is red in color with few to no feathers. It also has a relatively short, hooked, ivory-colored beak. The irises of the eyes are gray-brown; legs and feet are pink-skinned, although typically stained white. The eye has a single incomplete row of eyelashes on the upper lid and two rows on the lower lid.

The two front toes of the foot are long and have small webs at their bases. Tracks are large, between 9.5 and 14 cm (3.7 and 5.5 in) in length and 8.2 and 10.2 cm (3.2 and 4.0 in) in width, both measurements including claw marks. Toes are arranged in the classic, anisodactyl pattern. The feet are flat, relatively weak, and poorly adapted to grasping; the talons are also not designed for grasping, as they are relatively blunt. In flight, the tail is long and slim. The black vulture is relatively shorter-tailed and shorter-winged, which makes it appear rather smaller in flight than the turkey vulture, although the body masses of the two species are roughly the same. The nostrils are not divided by a septum, but rather are perforate; from the side one can see through the beak. It undergoes a molt in late winter to early spring. It is a gradual molt, which lasts until early autumn. The immature bird has a gray head with a black beak tip; the colors change to those of the adult as the bird matures.

Captive longevity is not well known. As of 2025, there is one captive bird which is 51 years old: a male named Lord Richard that lives at the Lindsay Wildlife Experience in Walnut Creek, California. Lord Richard hatched in 1974 at Randall Museum in San Francisco and arrived at Lindsay Wildlife later that year. Another turkey vulture named Nero lived to the age of 47. Nero also hatched in 1974 and was taken from his nest for research studies at the University of Wisconsin. He later became an education ambassador at Carpenter Nature Center in Hastings, Minnesota, and in 1993 he joined the education department of the University of Minnesota's Raptor Center. He remained their only educational vulture until his death in 2022.

The oldest wild captured banded bird was 16 years old.

Leucistic (sometimes mistakenly called "albino") turkey vultures are sometimes seen.

Like most other vultures, the turkey vulture has very few vocalization capabilities. Because it lacks a syrinx, it can only utter hisses and grunts.

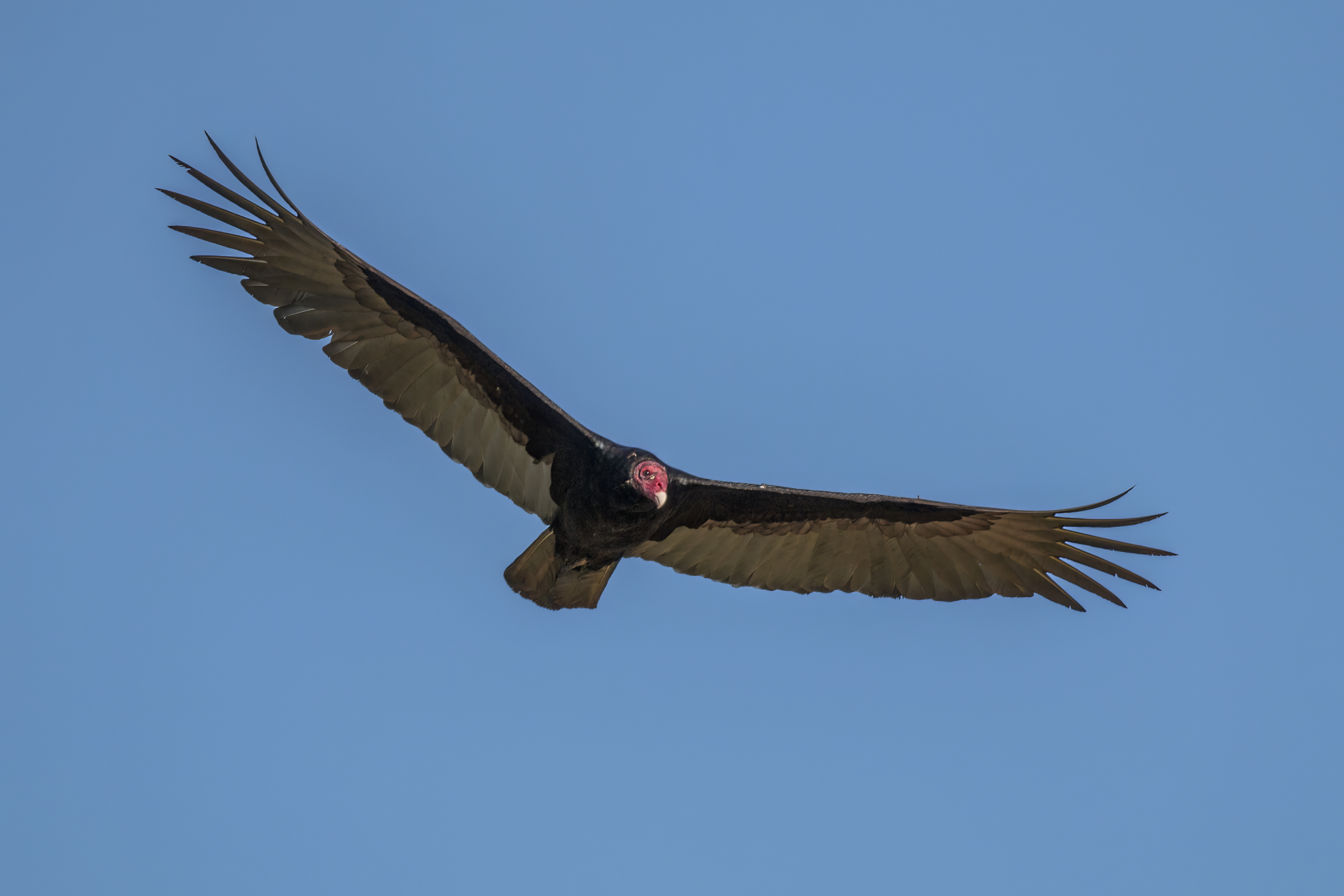
Antillean turkey vulture
C. a. aura, Cuba

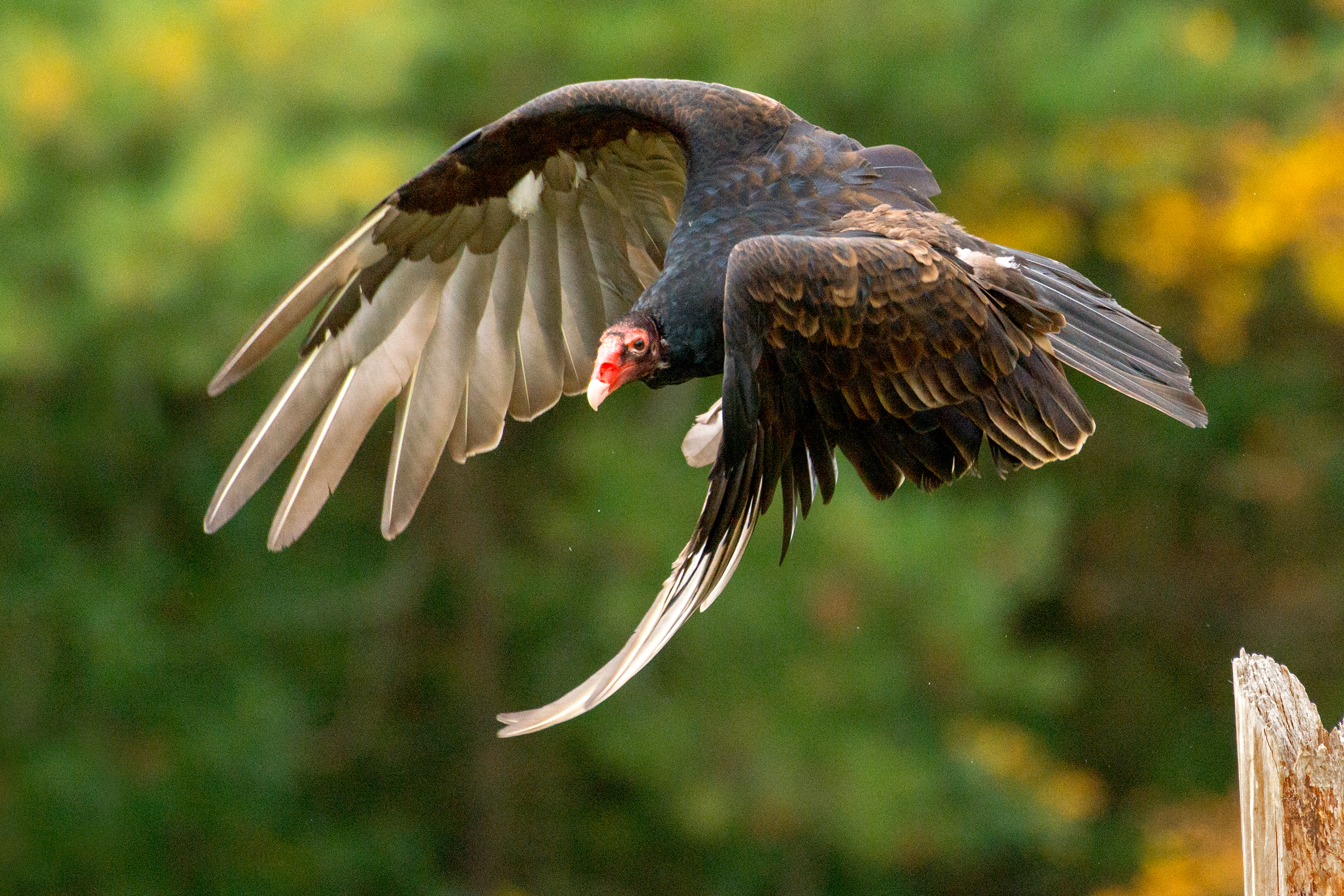
Eastern turkey vulture
C. a. septentrionalis, Canada

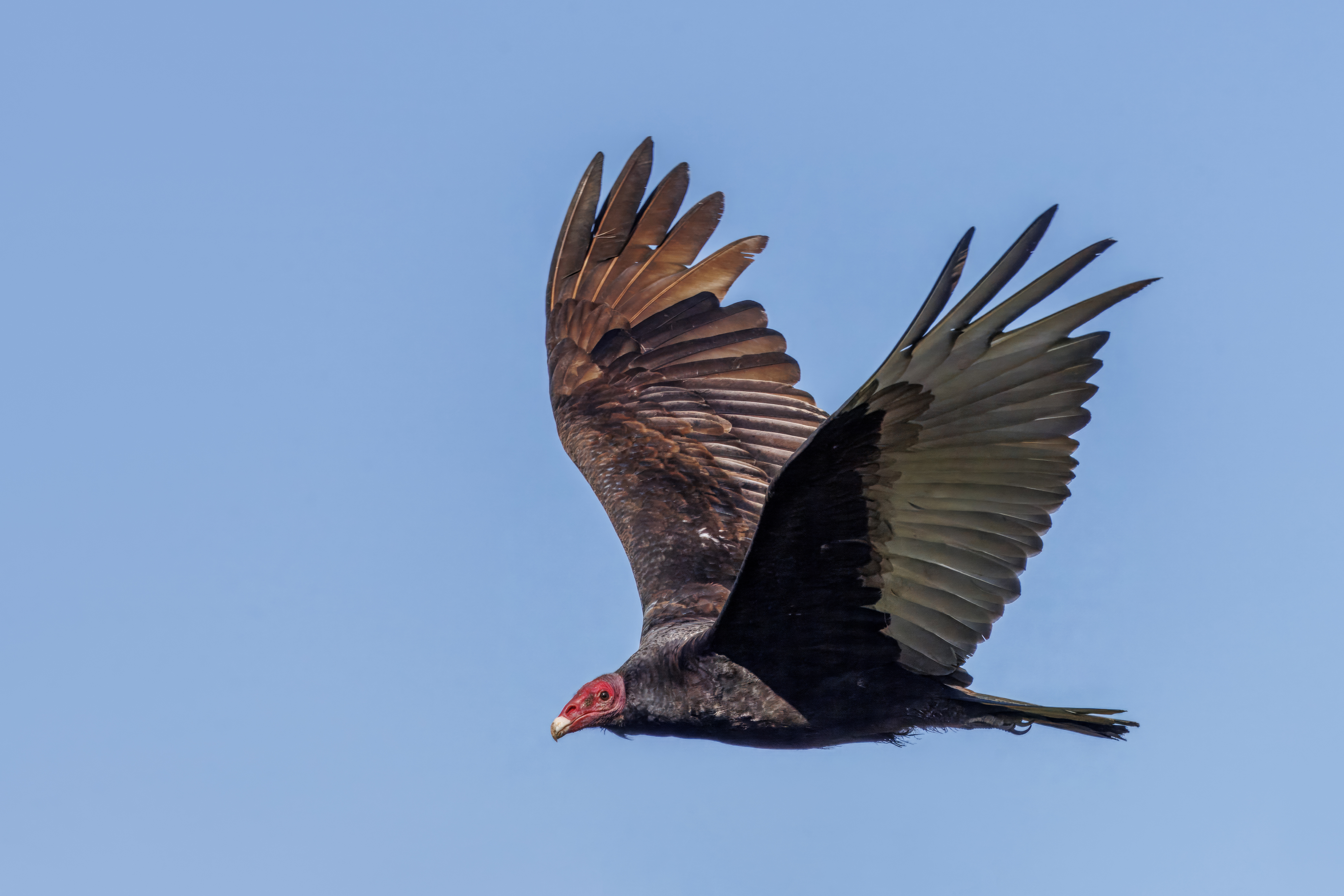
Chilean turkey vulture
C. a. jota, Chile

== Ecology and behavior ==
Turkey vultures coming in to the same roost they use for the season.

The turkey vulture is gregarious and roosts in large community groups, breaking away to forage independently during the day. Several hundred vultures may roost communally in groups, which sometimes even include black vultures. It roosts often on dead, leafless trees as well as low-density conifers, and will also roost on man-made structures such as water or microwave towers. Though it nests in caves, it does not enter them except during the breeding season. The turkey vulture lowers its night-time body temperature by about 6 °C or 11 °F to 34 °C (93 °F), becoming slightly hypothermic.

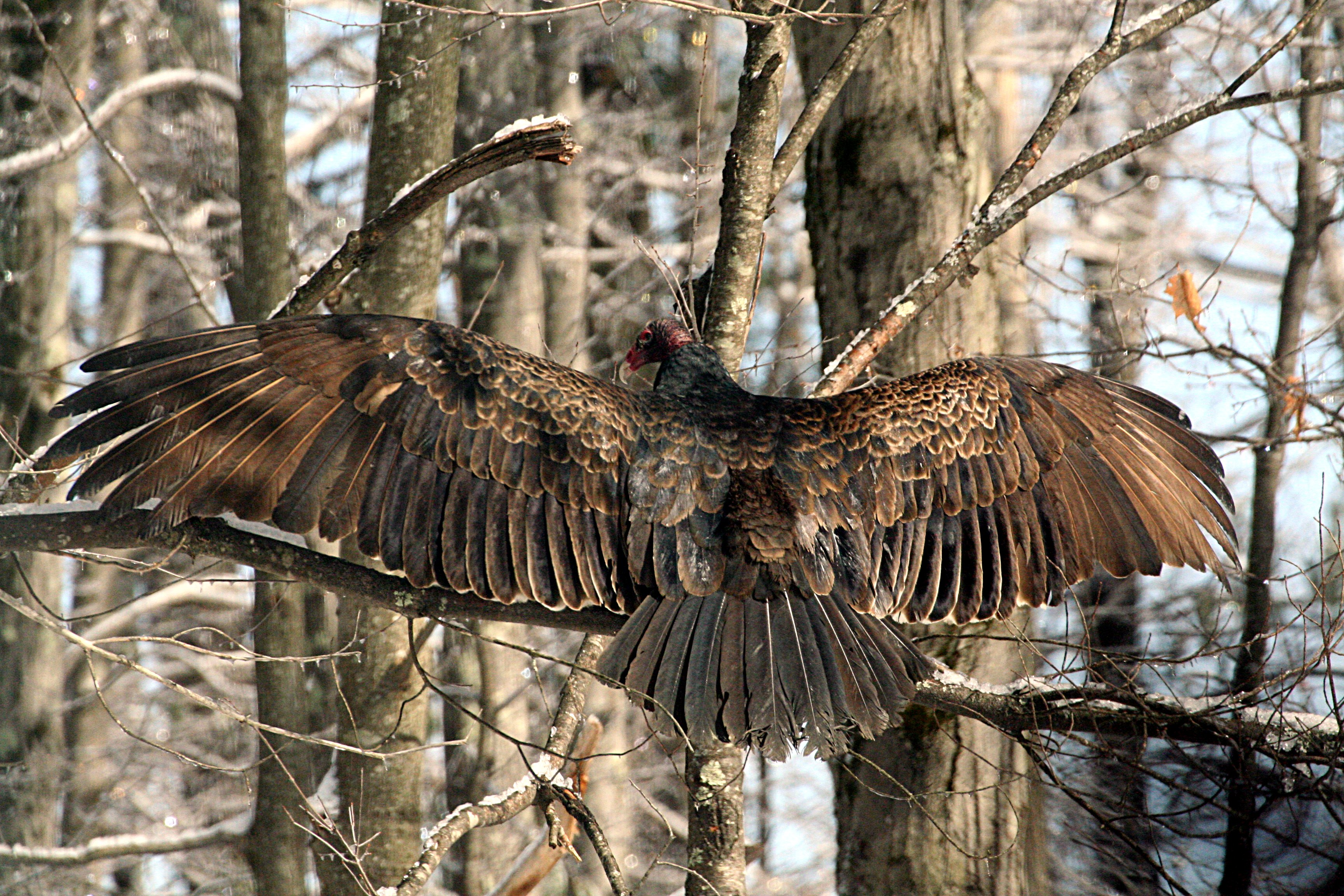
Adult bird in horaltic pose

This vulture is often seen standing in a spread-winged or horaltic stance. The stance is believed to serve multiple functions: drying the wings, warming the body, and baking off bacteria. It is practiced more often following damp or rainy nights. This same behavior is displayed by other New World vultures, by Old World vultures, and by storks. Like storks, the turkey vulture often defecates on its own legs, using the evaporation of the water in the feces and/or urine to cool itself, a process known as urohidrosis. It cools the blood vessels in the unfeathered tarsi and feet, and causes white uric acid to streak the legs.

The turkey vulture has few natural predators and the few recorded predators appear to take them quite infrequently. Fledging, immature and adult vultures, in descending likelihood of predation, may fall prey to great horned owls, golden eagles, bald eagles and potentially red-tailed hawks, while eggs and nestlings may be preyed on by mammals such as raccoons and opossums. Foxes can occasionally ambush an adult, but species that can climb are more likely to breach and predate nests than adults, while dogs may sometimes kill a turkey vulture as well. Its primary form of defense is regurgitating semi-digested meat, a foul-smelling substance, which deters most creatures intent on raiding a vulture nest. It will also sting if the predator is close enough to get the vomit in its face or eyes. In some cases, the vulture must rid its crop of a heavy, undigested meal to take flight to flee from a potential predator. Its life expectancy in the wild ranges upward of 16 years, with a captive life span of over 45 years being possible.

The turkey vulture is awkward on the ground with an ungainly, hopping walk. It requires a great deal of effort to take flight, flapping its wings while pushing off the ground and hopping with its feet. While soaring, the turkey vulture holds its wings in a shallow V-shape and often tips from side to side, frequently causing the gray flight feathers to appear silvery as they catch the light. The flight of the turkey vulture is an example of static soaring flight, in which it flaps its wings very infrequently, and takes advantage of rising thermals to stay soaring.

=== Breeding ===
The breeding season of the turkey vulture varies according to latitude. In the southern United States, it commences in March, peaks in April to May, and continues into June. In more northerly latitudes, the season starts later and extends into August. Courtship rituals of the turkey vulture involve several individuals gathering in a circle, where they perform hopping movements around the perimeter of the circle with wings partially spread. In the air, one bird closely follows another while flapping and diving.

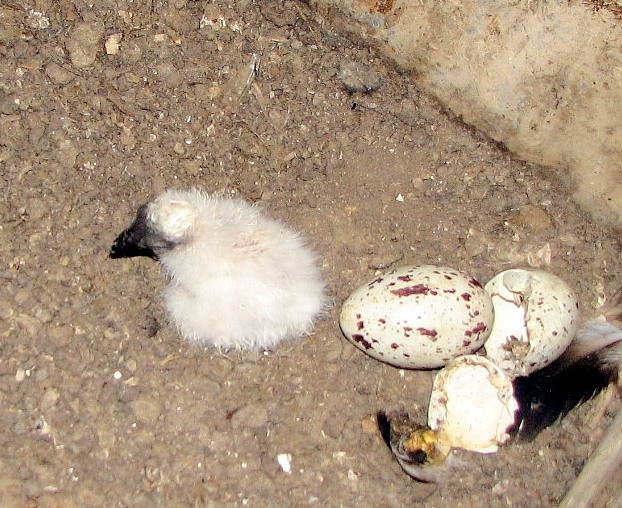
One chick immediately hatched and one egg not yet hatched

Eggs are generally laid in the nesting site in a protected location such as a cliff, a cave, a rock crevice, a burrow, inside a hollow tree, or in a thicket. There is little or no construction of a nest; eggs are laid on a bare surface. Females generally lay two eggs, but sometimes one and rarely three. Turkey vulture eggs measure 6.5–7.5 cm (2.6–3.0 in) in length and 4.4–5.3 cm (1.7–2.1 in) in width. The eggs are cream-colored, with brown or lavender spots around their larger end. Both parents incubate, and the young hatch after 30 to 40 days. Chicks are altricial, or helpless at birth. Both adults feed the chicks by regurgitating food for them, and care for them for 10 to 11 weeks. When adults are threatened while nesting, they may flee, or they may regurgitate on the intruder or feign death. If the chicks are threatened in the nest, they defend themselves by hissing and regurgitating. The young fledge at about nine to ten weeks. Family groups remain together until fall.

=== Feeding ===
The turkey vulture feeds primarily on a wide variety of carrion, from small mammals (such as mice and shrews) to large grazers (such as ungulates), preferring those recently dead, and avoiding carcasses that have reached the point of putrefaction. They may rarely feed on plant matter, shoreline vegetation, pumpkin, grape, juniper, coconut and other crops, live frogs, live insects and other invertebrates. Turkey vultures have also been observed eating coyote, sea lion and domestic animal dung. In South America, turkey vultures have been photographed feeding on the fruits of the introduced oil palm.

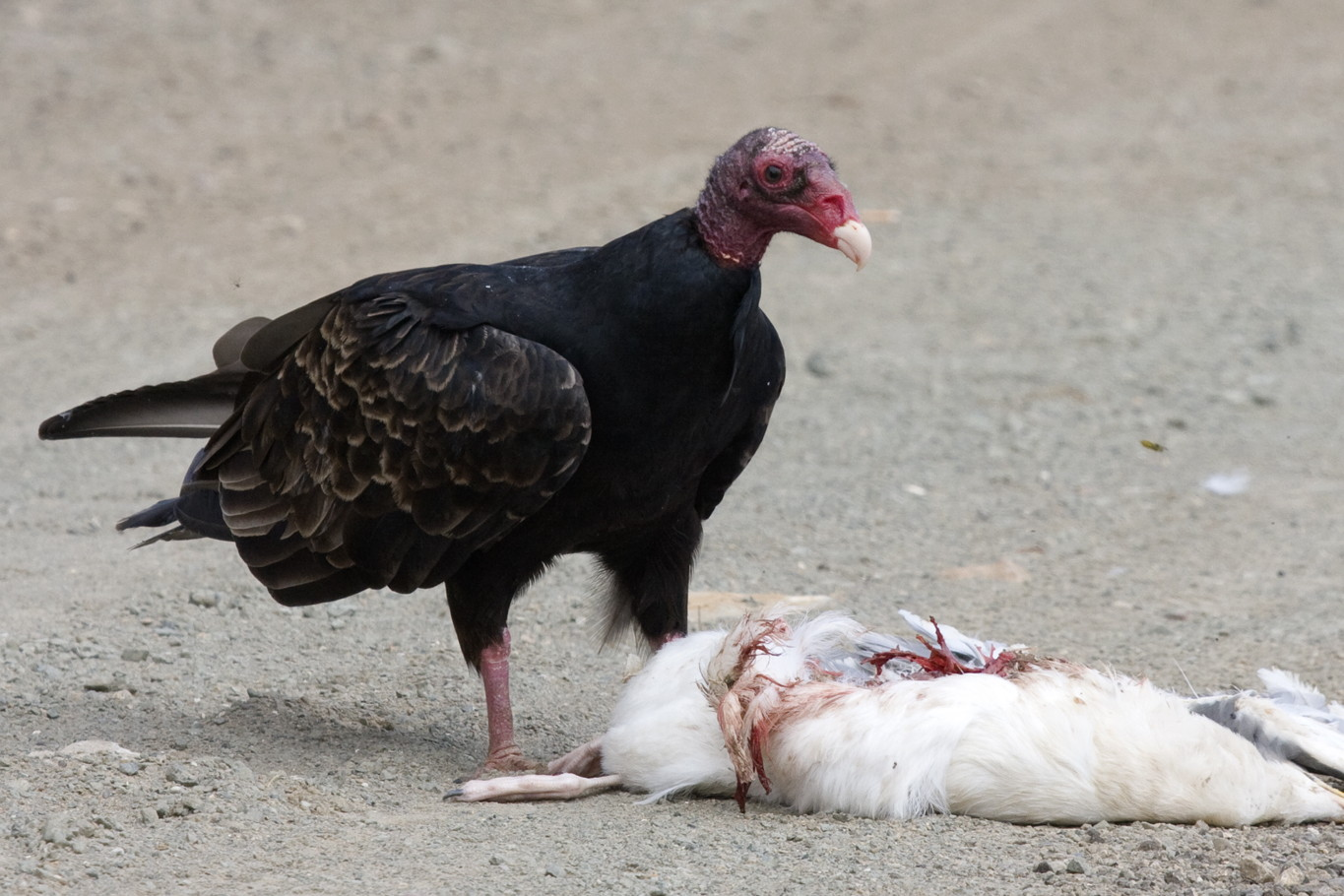
Feeding on a dead gull at Morro Bay, California

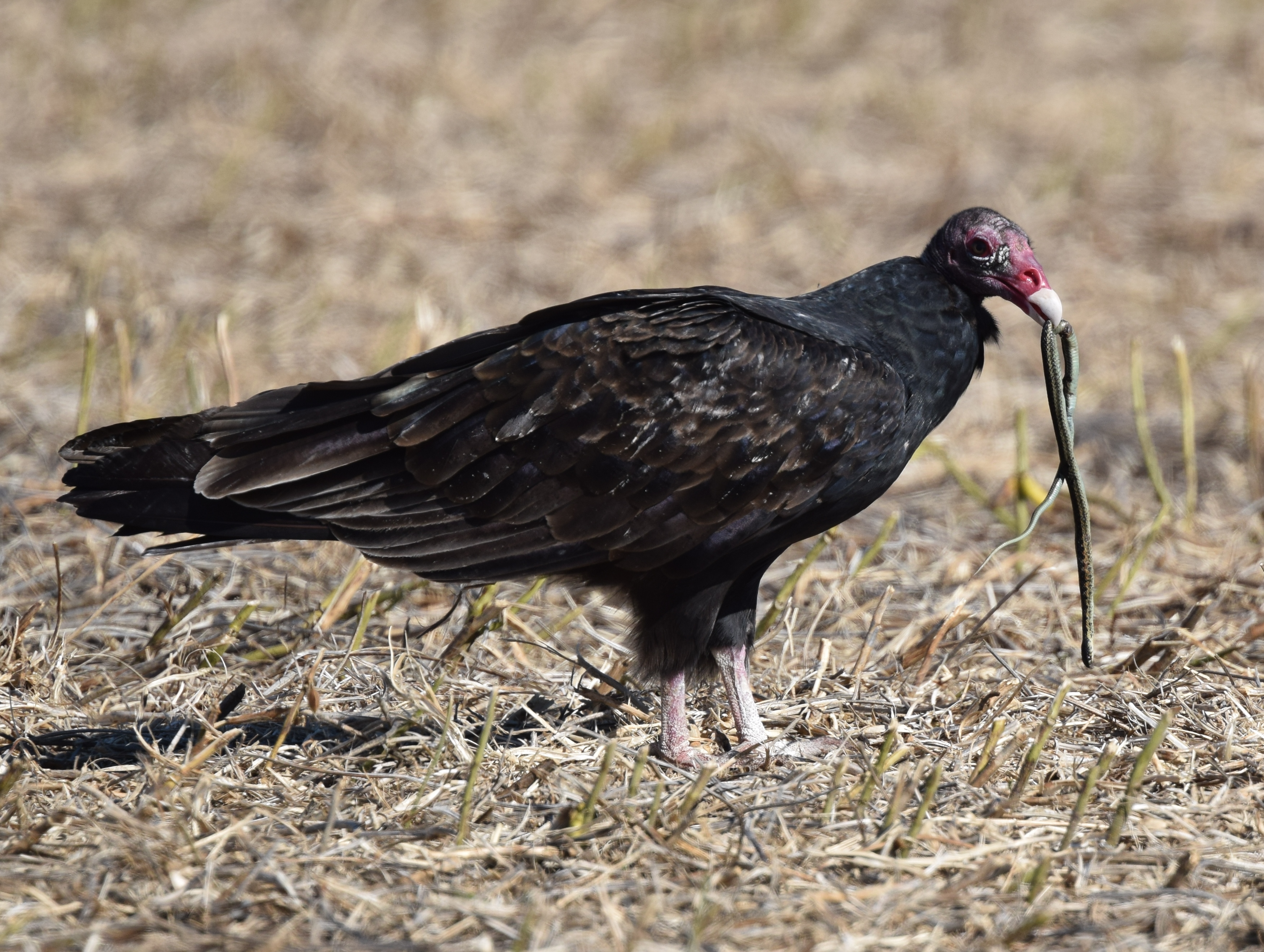
Eating a live garter snake

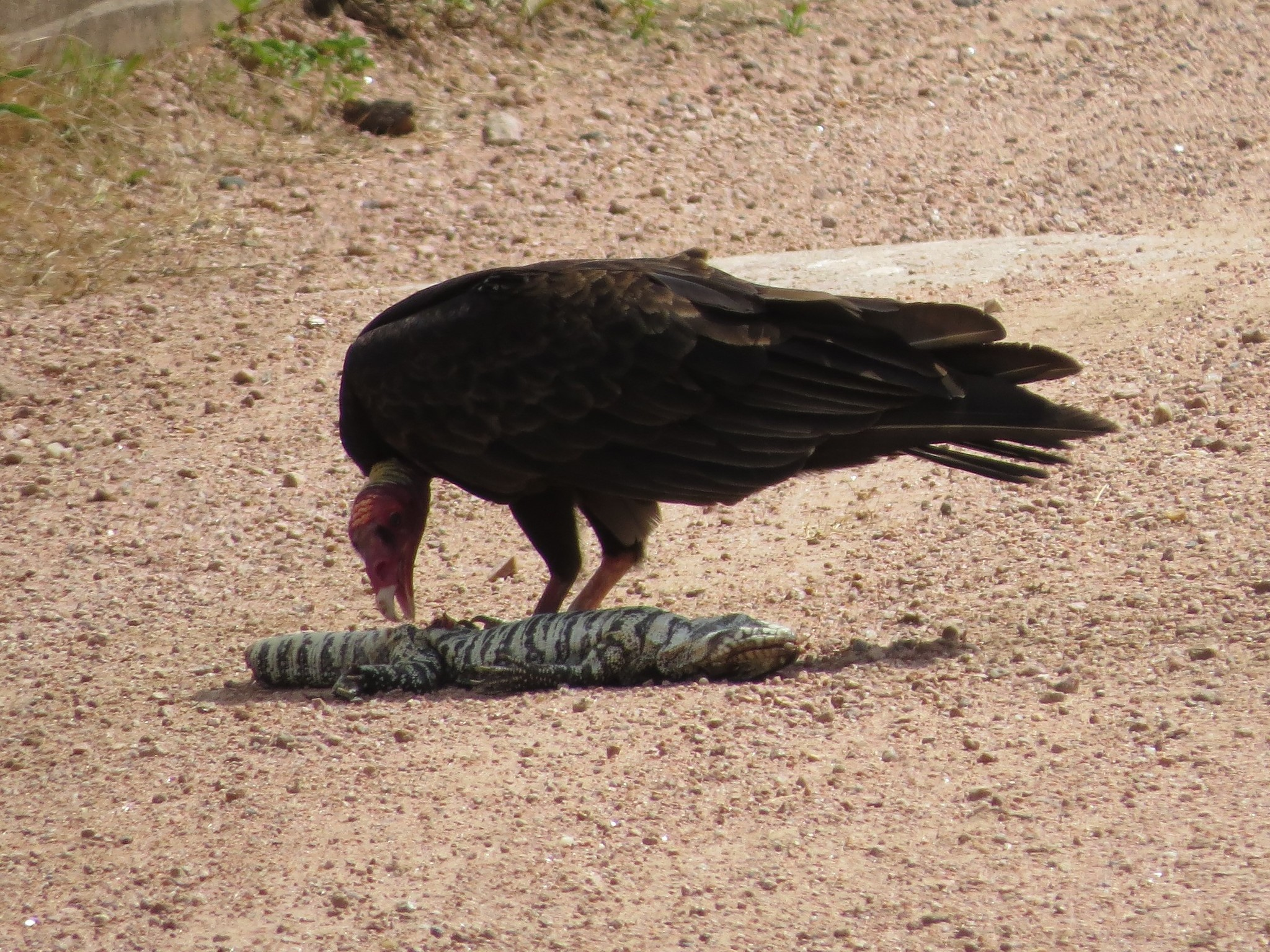
Tropical turkey vulture (C. a. ruficollis) eating an Argentine black and white tegu.

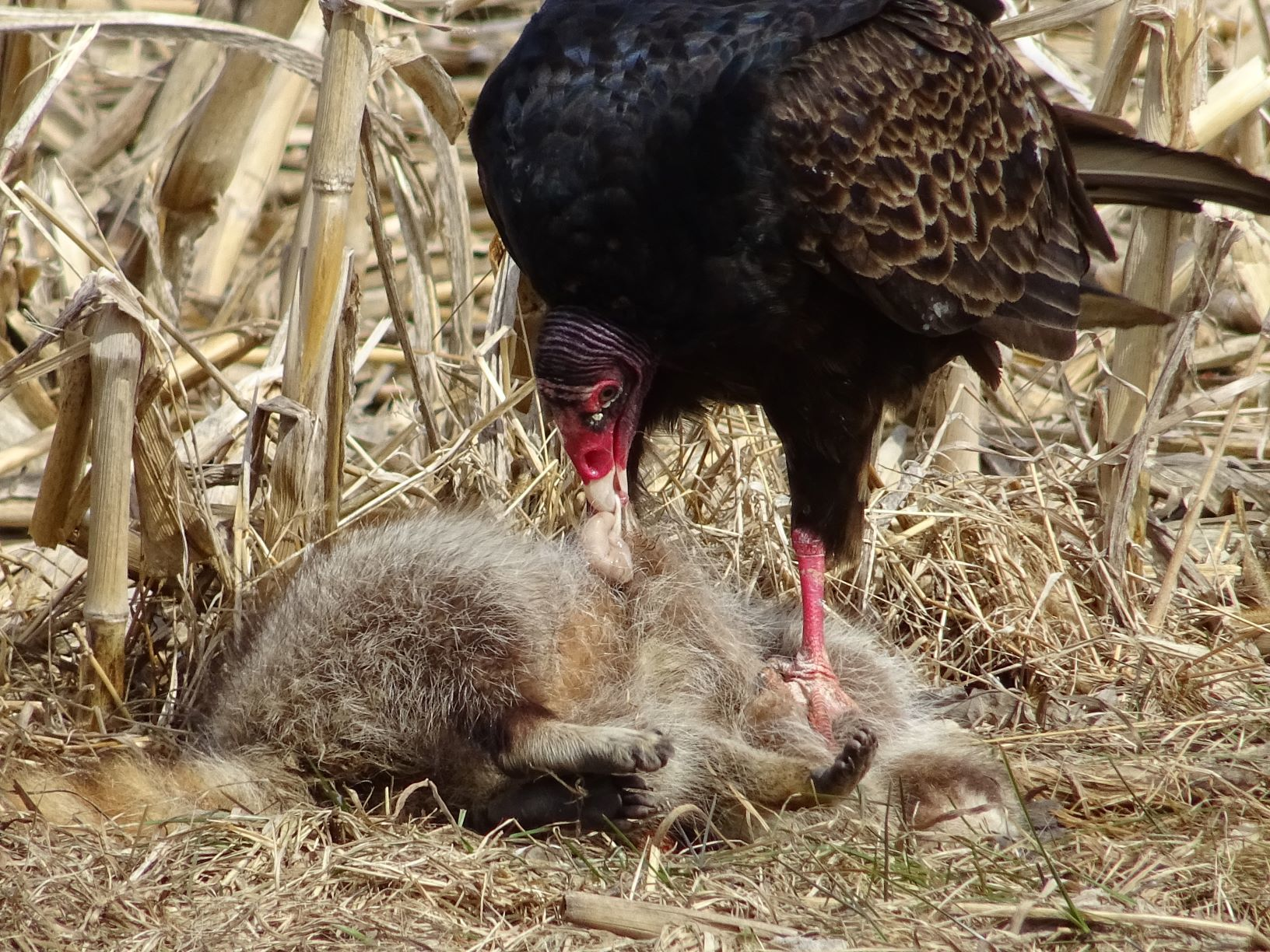
Eating a raccoon, in Ontario

They rarely, if ever, kill prey themselves; when they do it tends to comprise small weak offspring or very sick individuals of various animals, such as bird eggs and nestlings, as well as reptiles.

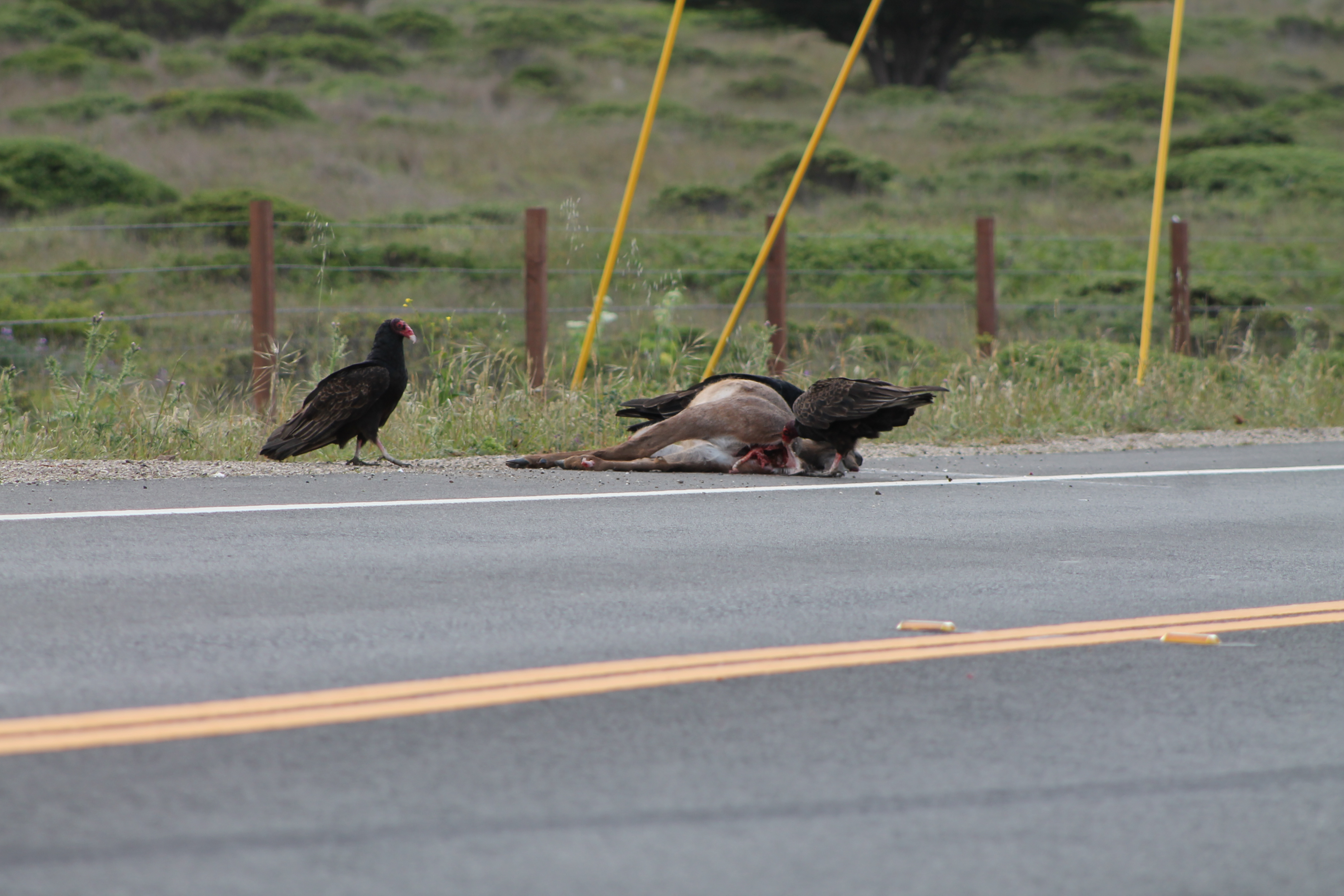
Eating roadkill deer

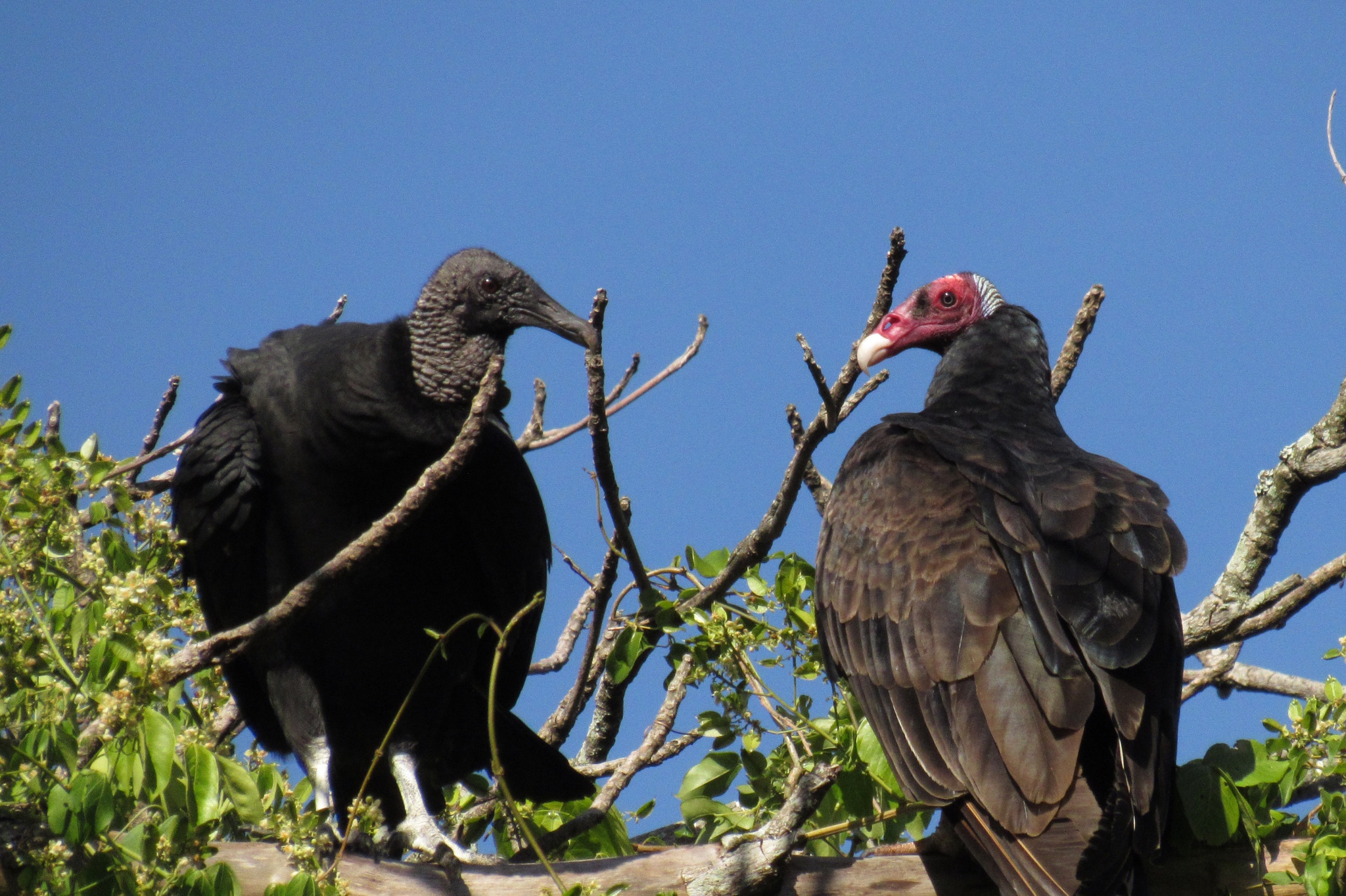
Black vulture (left) and turkey vulture (right), in Brazil

The turkey vulture can often be seen along roadsides feeding on roadkill, or near bodies of water, feeding on washed-up fish. They also will feed on fish, tadpoles or insects that have become stranded in shallow water. Turkey vultures also scavenge marine carrion along the Pacific coast. They have been observed feeding on marine mammal carcasses in Big Sur, California, while stable-isotope analysis of coastal populations in Baja California, Mexico found that marine-derived food can constitute a substantial component of their diet. It sometimes comes to rubbish dumps, but in general, is a rather different kind of scavenger from the black vulture. Like other vultures, it plays an important role in the ecosystem by disposing of carrion, which would otherwise be a breeding ground for disease.

The turkey vulture forages by smell, an ability that is uncommon in the avian world, often flying low to the ground to pick up the scent of ethyl mercaptan, a gas produced by the beginnings of decay in dead animals. The olfactory lobe of its brain, responsible for processing smells, is particularly large compared to that of other animals. This heightened ability to detect odors allows it to search for carrion below the forest canopy. King vultures, black vultures, and condors, which lack the ability to smell carrion at long distances, follow turkey vultures to carcasses. While other members of family Cathartidae were once believed to have no sense of smell, newer research suggests they are able to smell at short distances.

The turkey vulture arrives first at the carcass, or with greater yellow-headed vultures or lesser yellow-headed vultures, which also share the ability to smell carrion. It displaces the yellow-headed vultures from carcasses due to its larger size, but is displaced in turn by the king vulture and both types of condor, which make the first cut into the skin of the dead animal. This allows the smaller, weaker-billed turkey vulture access to food, because it cannot tear the tough hides of larger animals on its own. This is an example of mutual dependence between species. Black vultures tend to be more aggressive and often displace turkey vultures which appear to be intimidated especially by the feeding frenzy engaged in by the black vultures when they come in numbers (a behavior turkey vultures are apparently incapable of even when at a carcass in numbers), however pairs or individuals often seem to be able to peaceably share carrion with turkey vultures. However, in the tropics such as Peru, turkey vultures appeared to prevail regularly over black vultures, in 56% of cases, perhaps due to the smaller size of the region's black vultures. It is further subservient to large hawks such as red-tailed hawks, Harris's hawks and Buteogallus black hawks, as well as to large falcons like peregrine falcons and crested caracaras, despite most of these birds being rather smaller in body size than a turkey vulture. Often these raptors tend to engage in dive-bombing or other intimidation displays towards the vulture(s) to displace them from carrion or from perch sites. Presumably all sympatric eagles are also dominant, with bald eagles confirmed to easily dominate turkey vultures in Florida. However, in the tropics Swainson's hawks and yellow-headed caracara (as well as lesser yellow-headed vultures) appear to be subservient to turkey vultures. Furthermore, turkey vultures are dominant over crows at carrion, but not over common ravens.

== Relationship with humans ==
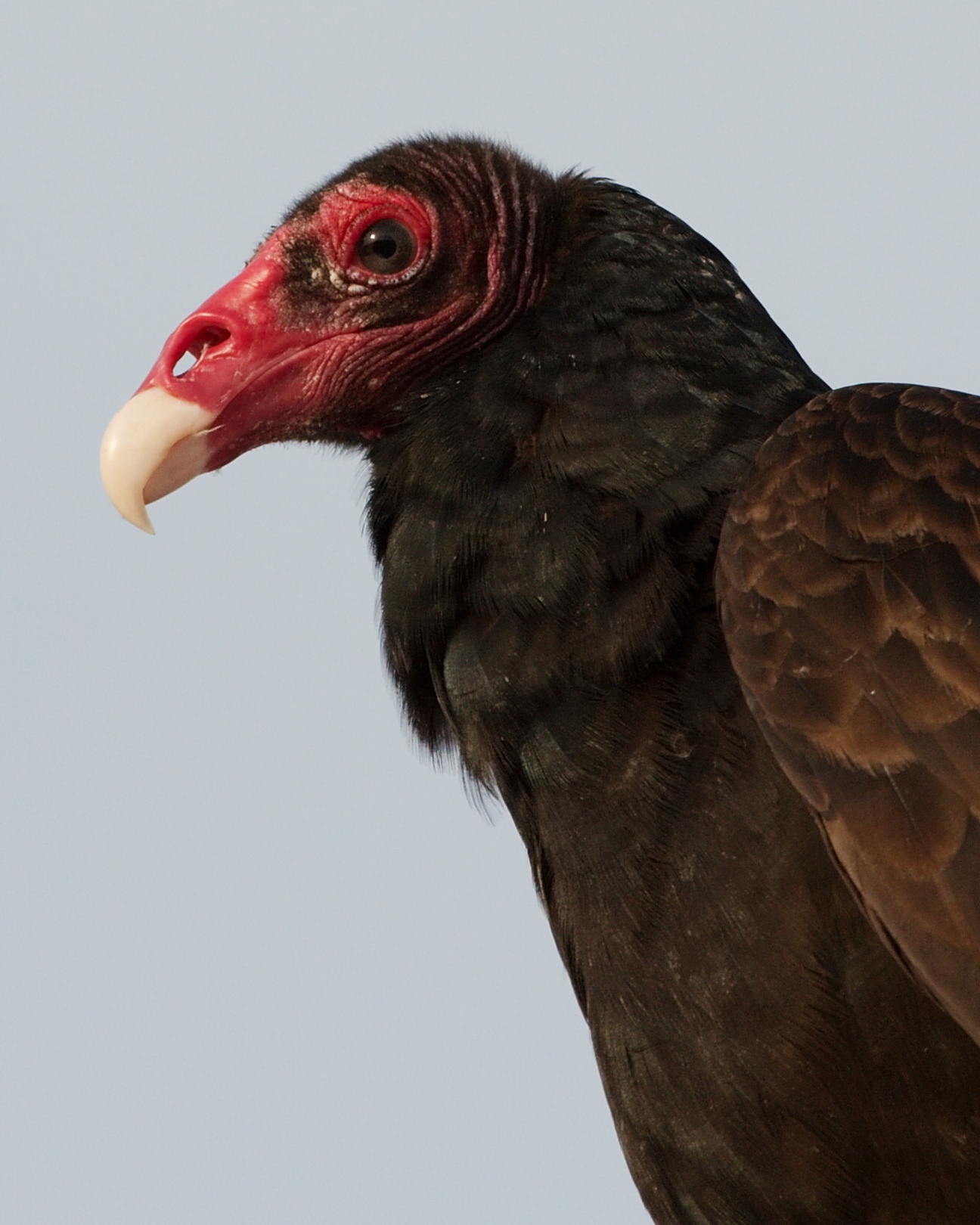
A side view, showing the perforated nostrils

The turkey vulture is sometimes accused of carrying anthrax or hog cholera, both livestock diseases, on its feet or bill by cattle ranchers and is therefore occasionally perceived as a threat. However, the virus that causes hog cholera is destroyed when it passes through the turkey vulture's digestive tract. This species also may be perceived as a threat by farmers due to the similar black vulture's tendency to attack and kill newborn cattle. The turkey vulture does not kill live animals but will mix with flocks of black vultures and will scavenge what they leave behind. Nonetheless, its appearance at a location where a calf has been killed gives the incorrect impression that the turkey vulture represents a danger to calves. The droppings produced by turkey vultures and other vultures can harm or kill trees and other vegetation. In captivity, it can be fed fresh meat, and younger birds will gorge themselves if given the opportunity.

Contaminants and pollutants generated from human activity pose health risks to turkey vultures and may impact brood success, fertility, and individual health. Turkey vultures are susceptible to lead poisoning due to the ingestion of meat killed by hunters using lead pellet ammunition. When the bird ingests the lead pellets within the carrion it leaches toxic lead into their bodies. Even at low contamination, lead exposure is linked to disease, neurological damage and reproductive failure.

The turkey vulture species receives special legal protections under the Migratory Bird Treaty Act of 1918 in the United States, by the Convention for the Protection of Migratory Birds in Canada, and by the Convention for the Protection of Migratory Birds and Game Mammals in Mexico. In the United States it is illegal to take, kill, or possess turkey vultures, their eggs, and any body parts including but not limited to their feathers except under permit; violation of the law is punishable by a fine of up to $100,000 for individuals or $200,000 for organizations, and/or a prison term of 1 year. It is listed as a species of least concern by the IUCN Red List. Populations appear to remain stable, and it has not reached the threshold of inclusion as a threatened species, which requires a decline of more than 30 percent in 10 years or three generations.
