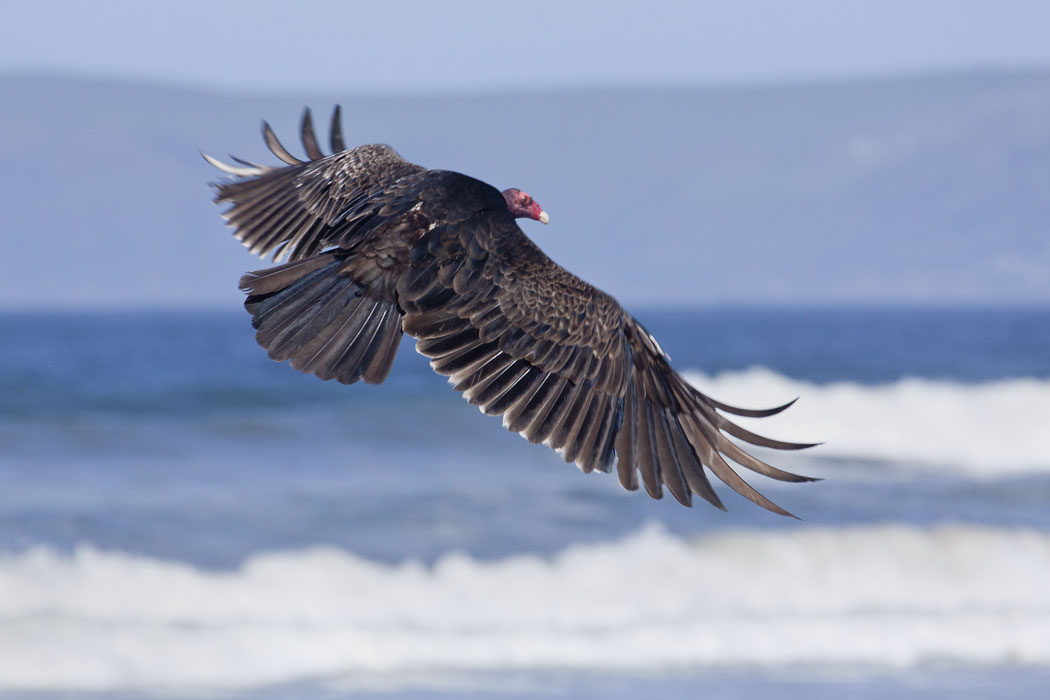
- Turkey vulture in Morro Bay, California

Scientific classification
- Kingdom: Animalia
- Phylum: Chordata
- Class: Aves
- Order: Accipitriformes
- Family: Cathartidae
- Genus: Cathartes; Illiger, 1811

Type species
- Vultur aura Linnaeus, 1758

Species
- C. aura (Linnaeus, 1758); C. burrovianus Cassin, 1845; C. melambrotus Wetmore, 1964; †C. emsliei Suárez and Olson, 2020
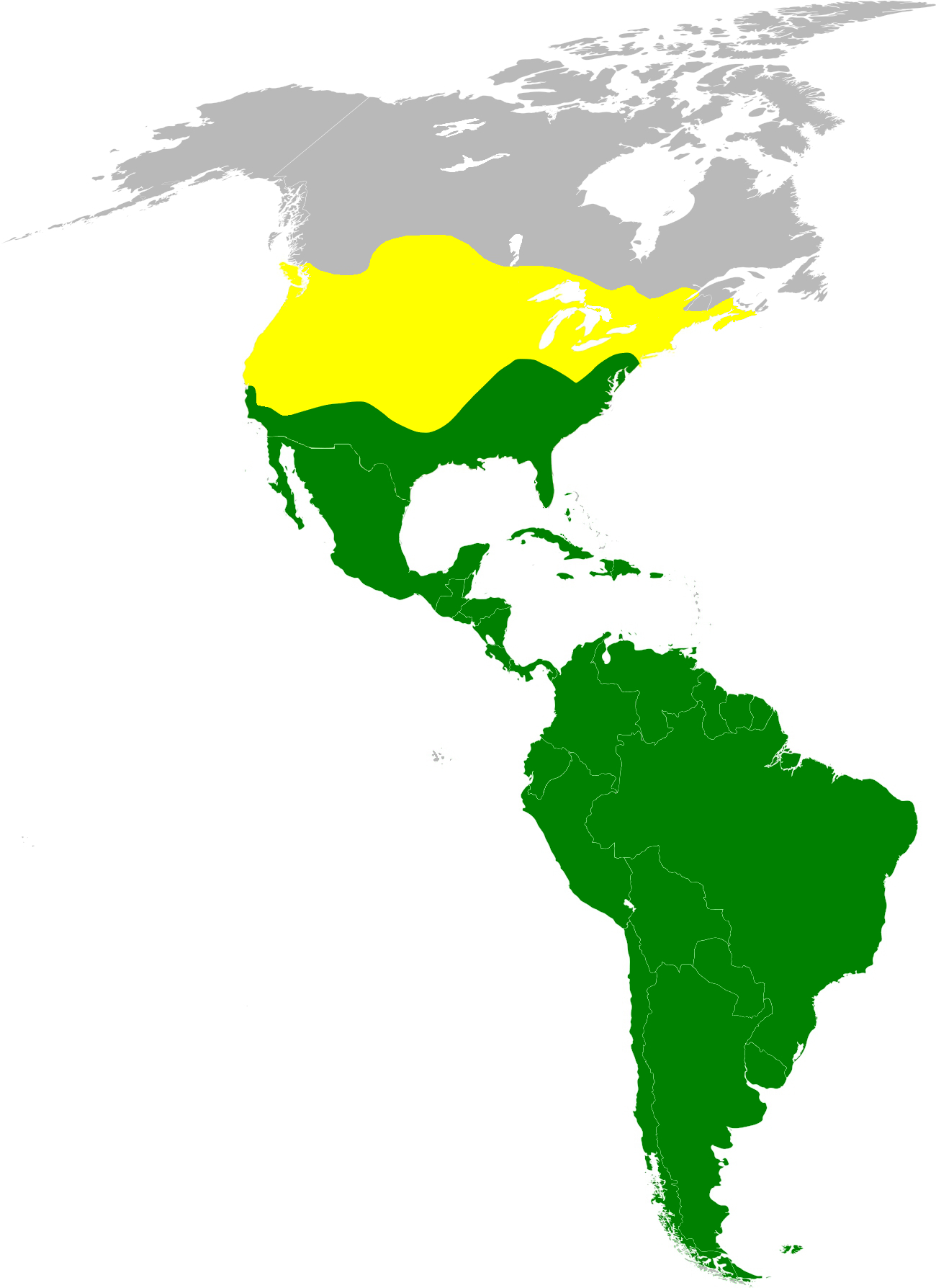
- Approximate distribution of the genus Cathartes. Green indicates that at least one species is resident year-round and yellow shows areas where one species, the turkey vulture, is a summer-only breeding visitor.

= Cathartes =

Genus of birds

The genus Cathartes includes medium-sized to large carrion-feeding birds in the New World vulture (Cathartidae) family. The three extant species currently classified in this genus occur widely in the Americas. There is one extinct species known from the Quaternary of Cuba.

Cathartes is the Greek word καθαρτής, for "purifier," referring to these vultures' role as "cleansers" that "tidy up" decomposing corpses in nature.

== Taxonomy ==
=== Description ===
The first member of this genus to be formally described, the turkey vulture, was named by Linnaeus as Vultur aura in his Systema Naturae in 1758, but was eventually moved to the current genus which had been created by German zoologist Johann Illiger in 1811. The yellow-headed birds first described in 1845 by John Cassin were not split into two species until 1964.

=== Systematics ===
Cathartes is one of the five genera of New World vultures. The taxonomic placement of these vultures remains unclear. It is the only genus in its family that is not monotypic. The New World and Old World vultures are similar in appearance and have similar ecological roles, but evolved from different ancestors in widely separated parts of the world. The relationships between the two vulture groups is a matter of debate, with some earlier authorities suggesting that the New World vultures are more closely related to storks.

In 2007 the American Ornithologists' Union's North American checklist moved Cathartidae back into the lead position in Falconiformes, but with an asterisk that indicates it is a taxon "that is probably misplaced in the current phylogenetic listing but for which data indicating proper placement are not yet available". The AOU's draft South American checklist places the Cathartidae in their own order, Cathartiformes. However, recent DNA study on the evolutionary relationships between bird groups also suggests that they are related to the other birds of prey and should be part of a new order Accipitriformes instead, a position adopted in 2010 by the AOU's North American check-list, and shared with the International Ornithological Congress.

=== Species ===
The genus Cathartes has three recognized extant species:

Genus Cathartes – Illiger, 1811 – three species
Common name	Scientific name and subspecies	Range	Size and ecology	IUCN status and estimated population
Turkey vulture	Cathartes aura (Linnaeus, 1758) Five subspecies: C. a. aura; C. a. jota Molina, GI 1782; C. a. meridionalis Swann, 1921; C. a. ruficollis Spix, 1824; C. a. septentrionalis Wied-Neuwied, 1839	the Americas from southern Canada to Cape Horn	Size: Habitat: Diet:	LC 18,000,000
Lesser yellow-headed vulture	Cathartes burrovianus Cassin, 1845	Argentina, Belize, Bolivia, Brazil, Chile, Colombia, Costa Rica, Ecuador, El Salvador, French Guiana, Guatemala, Guyana, Honduras, Mexico, Nicaragua, Panama, Paraguay, Peru, Suriname, Uruguay, and Venezuela	Size: Habitat: Diet:	LC 500,000-4,999,999
Greater yellow-headed vulture	Cathartes melambrotus Wetmore, 1964	South America	Size: Habitat: Diet:	LC between 100,000 and 1,000,000

One extinct species, Emslie's vulture (C. emsliei) is known from Late Quaternary fossil remains from Cuba, and it likely went extinct following the extinction of the megafauna whose carrion it would have fed on during the Quaternary extinction event, coupled with the subsequent loss of the savanna habitats it would have favored.

== Description ==
Turkey vultures coming in to the same roost they use for the season.

All Cathartes species have featherless heads with brightly colored skin, yellow to orange in the yellow-headed vultures, bright red in the turkey vulture. All three species share a well-developed sense of smell, which is rare in birds, that enables them to locate carrion under the canopy.

== Distribution and habitat ==
The vultures of Cathartes mostly occupy forests of the Americas, especially Mexico, Central America, and South America.

== Ecology and behaviour ==
While all species obtain most of their diet by scavenging, the lesser yellow-headed vulture is known to hunt live prey in wetland environments.
