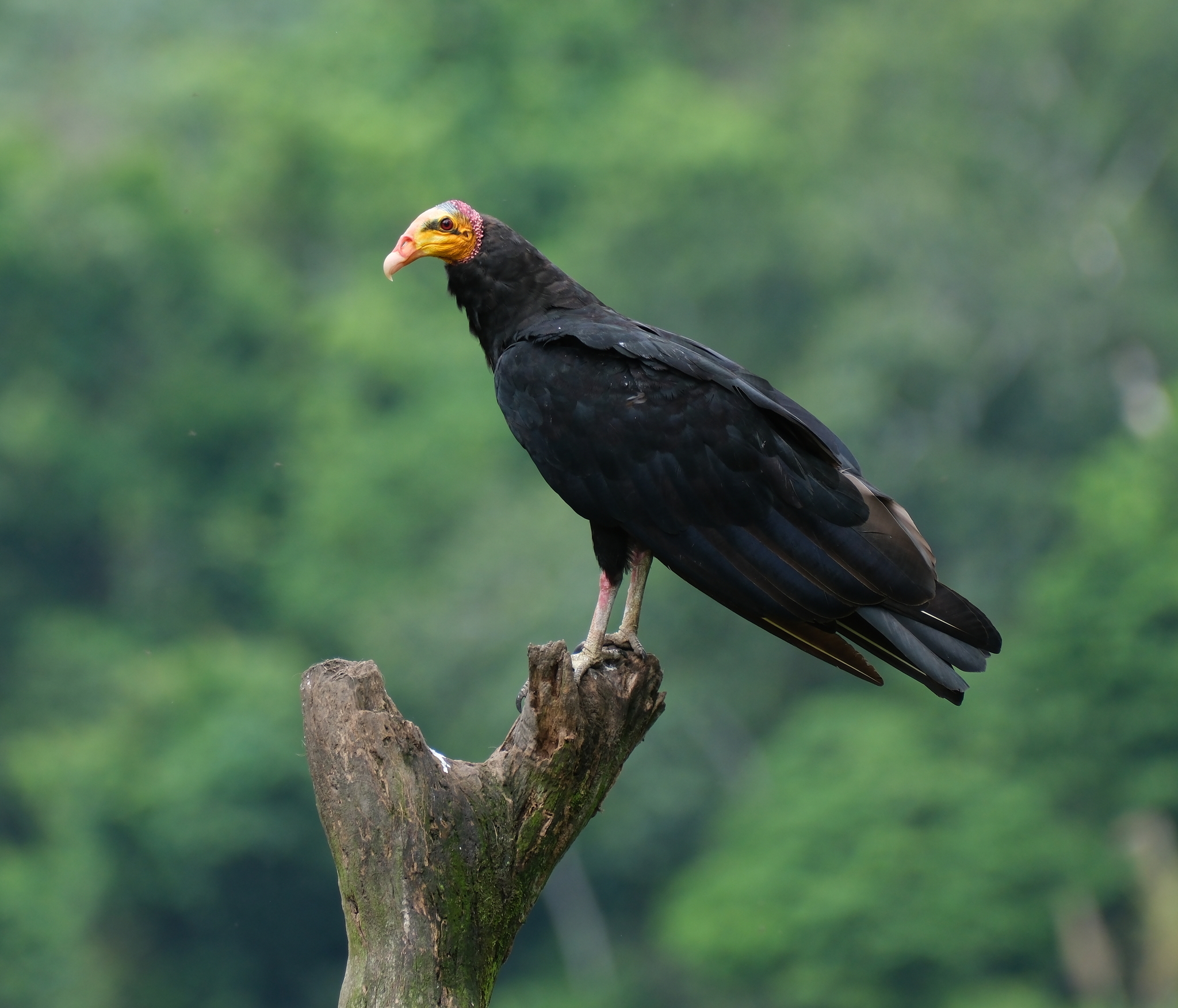
- In Peru

Conservation status
- Least Concern (IUCN 3.1)

Scientific classification
- Kingdom: Animalia
- Phylum: Chordata
- Class: Aves
- Order: Cathartiformes
- Family: Cathartidae
- Genus: Cathartes
- Species: C. melambrotus

Binomial name
- Cathartes melambrotus Wetmore, 1964
- Range/distribution map of the greater yellow-headed vulture IUCN data

= Greater yellow-headed vulture =

Species of bird

The greater yellow-headed vulture (Cathartes melambrotus), also known as the forest vulture, is a species of bird in the New World vulture family Cathartidae. It was considered to be the same species as the lesser yellow-headed vulture until they were split in 1964. It is found in South America in tropical moist lowland forests. It is a fairly large bird, with a wingspan of 166–178 cm (65–70 in), a weight of 1.65 kilograms (3.6 lb) and a body length of 64–75 cm (25–30 in). The body plumage is black, and the head and neck, which are featherless, range in color from deep yellow to pale orange. It lacks a syrinx, and its vocalizations are therefore limited to grunts or low hisses.

The greater yellow-headed vulture feeds on carrion and locates carcasses by sight and by smell, an ability which is rare in birds. It is dependent on larger vultures, such as the king vulture, to open the hides of larger animal carcasses, as its bill is not strong enough to do this. Like other New World vultures, the greater yellow-headed vulture utilizes thermals to stay aloft with minimal effort. It lays its eggs on flat surfaces, such as the floors of caves, or in the hollows of stumps. It feeds its young by regurgitation.

== Taxonomy ==
The greater yellow-headed and the lesser yellow-headed vulture were distinguished as separate species and described in 1964 by Alexander Wetmore; both species had earlier been known as yellow-headed vultures. The greater yellow-headed vulture's genus is Cathartes, which means "purifier", and is Latinized from the Greek kathartēs/καθαρτης. The common name, vulture, is derived from the Latin word vulturus, meaning "tearer," in reference to its feeding habits.

The exact taxonomic placement of the greater yellow-headed vulture and the remaining six species of New World vultures remains unclear. Although they are similar in appearance and have similar ecological roles, the New World and Old World vultures evolved from different ancestors in different parts of the world. Just how different the two are is currently under debate, with some earlier authorities suggesting that the New World vultures are more closely related to storks. More recent authorities assert their overall position in the order Falconiformes along with the Old World vultures or place them in their own order, Cathartiformes. The South American Classification Committee has removed the New World vultures from Ciconiiformes and instead placed them in Incertae sedis, but notes that a move to Falconiformes or Cathartiformes is possible.

== Distribution and habitat ==
The greater yellow-headed vulture is found in the Amazon Basin of tropical South America; specifically in south-eastern Colombia, southern and eastern Venezuela, Guyana, French Guiana, Suriname, northern and western Brazil, northern Bolivia, eastern Peru and eastern Ecuador. It is not found in the Andes, in the lowlands west or north of the Andes, in the relatively open regions of northern South America, eastern South America, or in the southern subtropical regions. It has a large range, with an estimated global extent of occurrence of 6,700,000 square kilometers (2,586,884.5 sq mi). Its natural habitat is tropical moist lowland forests. It is not generally found in high-altitude regions. It is common in heavily forested regions. It may wander over grasslands, but rarely strays far from forested areas, which provide shelter and nesting areas.

== Description ==
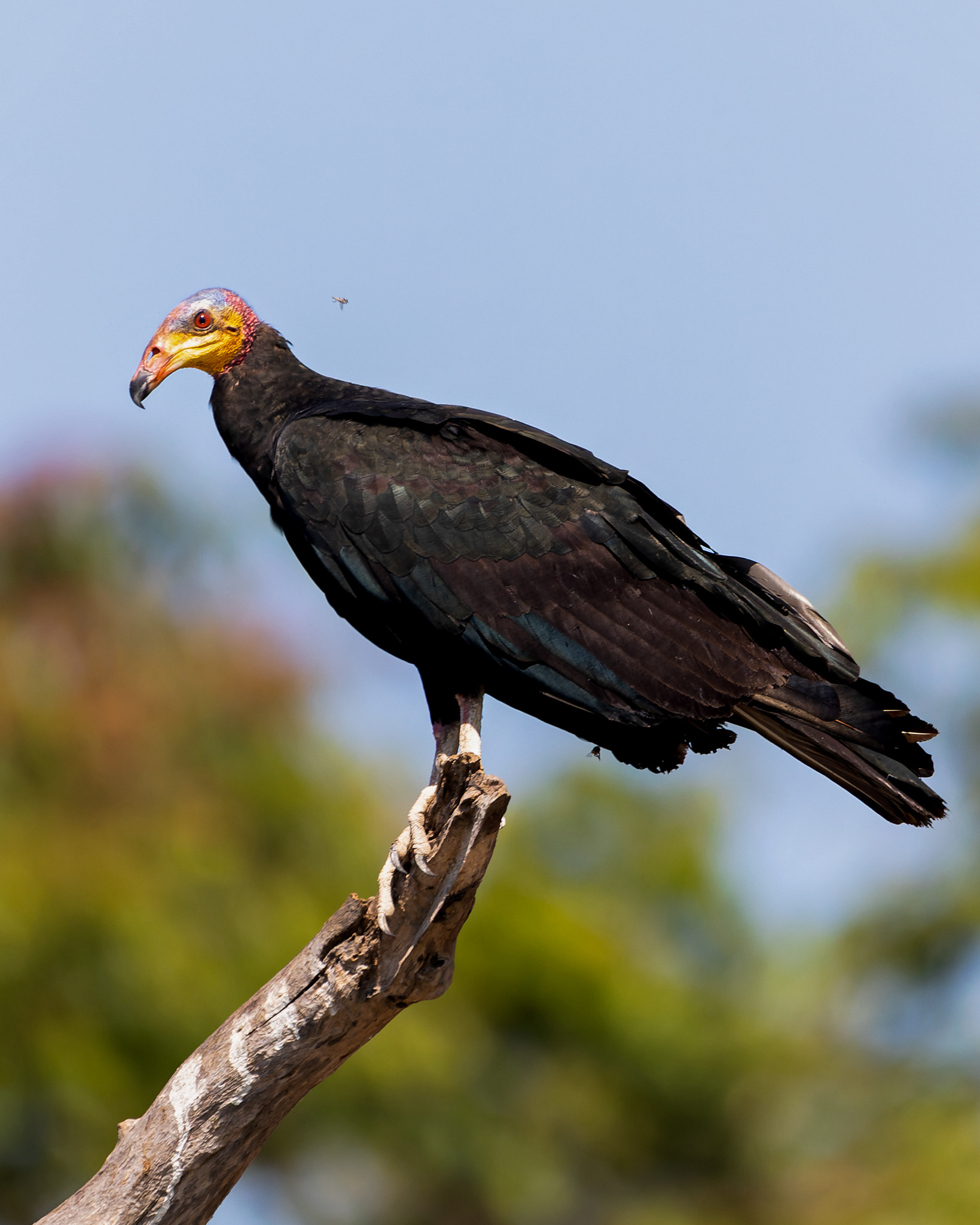
In Mato Grosso, Brazil

The greater yellow-headed vulture is 64–75 centimetres (25–30 in) in length, with a wingspan of 166–178 centimetres (65–70 in), a tail length of 25–29 centimetres (9.8–11.4 in) and a weight averaging 1.65 kilograms (3.6 lb). Its plumage is black with a green or purple sheen. The throat and the sides of the head are featherless. The skin on the head ranges in color from deep yellow to pale orange with a blue crown. The nape and the area near the nostrils are pale pinkish. The undersides of the wings are black, while the flight feathers are a lighter shade. The quills of the eleven primary feathers appear to be white when seen from above. The tail is rounded and long for a vulture, extending to or slightly beyond the tip of the closed wing. The sexes are outwardly similar. The head is dull greyish in juveniles, which otherwise resemble adults.

The irises of its eyes are red, its feet are black, and its beak is flesh-colored. The eye has a single incomplete row of eyelashes on the upper lid and two rows on the lower lid. Its beak is thick, rounded, and hooked at the tip. Because of its habit of urohidrosis, the scaly portions of its legs are often streaked white with uric acid. The front toes are long with small webs at their bases and are not adapted to grasping. The opening of the nostril is longitudinal and set in a soft cere, and the nostril lack a septum. Like all New World vultures, the greater yellow-headed vulture lacks a syrinx, and is therefore unable to make any sound other than grunts or a low hiss.

It differs in appearance from the similar lesser yellow-headed vulture in several ways. It is larger than the lesser yellow-headed vulture, with a longer, broader tail. The plumage is a dark, glossy black in contrast to the lesser yellow-headed vulture's browner plumage. Its legs are darker in color and its head is more yellow and less orange/pink than that of the lesser yellow-headed vulture. Its wings are broader and its flight is also steadier. Unlike the other members of the genus Cathartes, the greater yellow-headed vulture has relatively dark inner primaries, which contrast slightly with the paler secondaries and outer primaries. The greater yellow-headed vulture prefers to live in forests while the lesser yellow-headed vulture prefers to inhabit savannas, and it is more heavily built than the lesser yellow-headed vulture. The greater yellow-headed vulture is also somewhat larger than the turkey vulture. It can be distinguished from that species only at relatively close range by the differing head coloration. The underwing coloration is similar to the turkey vulture but the greater yellow-headed usually has a faint but broad and dark band vertically down the middle of the wings.

== Ecology and behavior ==
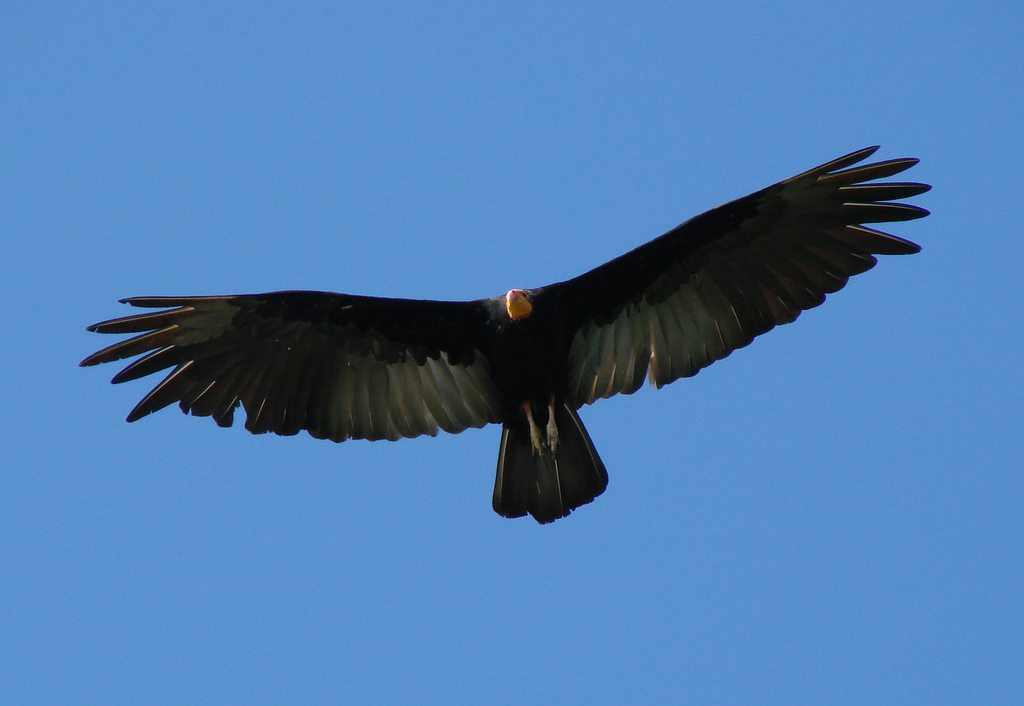
In flight, Tucuruí, Pará

The greater yellow-headed vulture roosts on high, exposed dead trees to observe surrounding terrain. When flying, it travels in pairs or alone and is rarely found in groups. Flight is heavy and steady. It flies with its wings held flat or very slightly above horizontal, in what is called the dihedral position. The flight of the greater yellow-headed is an example of static soaring flight, which uses thermals to maintain altitude without the need to flap its wings. The greater yellow-headed vulture also has the unusual habit of urohidrosis, in which it urinates or defecates on its legs to cool them evaporatively. This behavior is exhibited by storks and New World vultures.

=== Breeding ===
Greater yellow-headed vultures do not build nests, but rather lay their eggs directly on cliffs, the floors of caves, the ground, or in the hollows of stumps. Eggs are cream-colored and blotched with brown spots, particularly around the larger end. Clutch size ranges from one to three, though two is the norm. The chicks are altricial—blind, naked and relatively immobile upon hatching, and grow down feathers later. The parents feed their young by regurgitating pre-digested food into their beak, where the chicks then drink it. Young fledge after two to three months.

=== Feeding ===
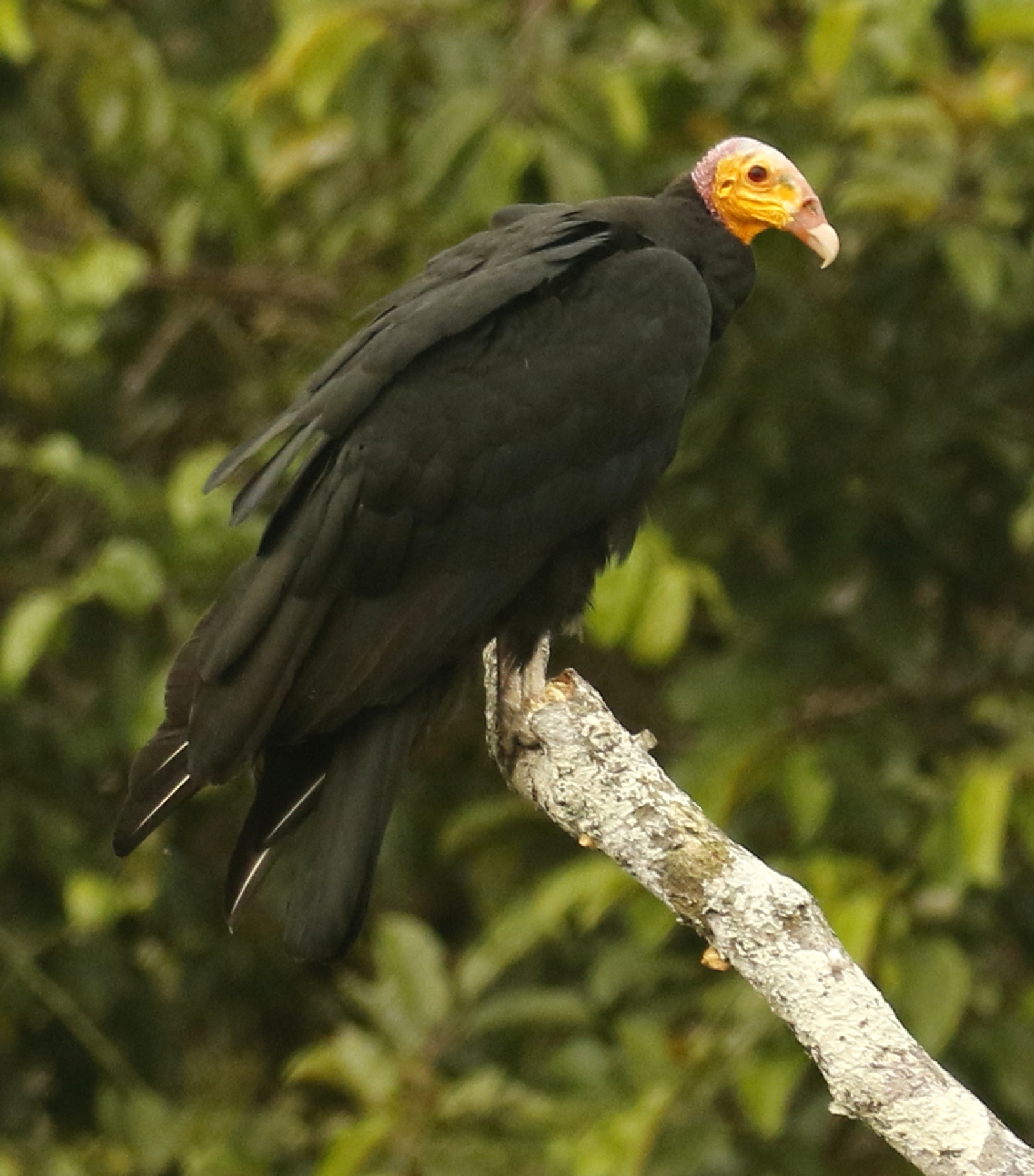
Sacha Lodge - Ecuador

The greater yellow-headed vulture is a scavenger and subsists entirely on carrion. It will eat roadkill or other animal carcasses, such as snakes, armadillos, dogs, foxes and cattle. Forest diet is likely to include high proportion of carcasses of the abundant sloths (Choloepus/Bradypus), whose combined total range coincides largely with those of this species and the lesser yellow-headed vulture, as well as monkeys, sloths, opossums, rats, birds and fish. It prefers fresh meat, but often cannot make the first cut into the carcass of a larger animal as its beak is not strong enough to tear into the tough hide. After a few days, the greater yellow-headed vulture will no longer feed on a piece of carrion, as the meat will begin to decay and become contaminated with microbial toxins. It will drink water from a pool, pond, or any receptacle provided. Like other vultures, they play an important role in the ecosystem by disposing of carrion which could otherwise be a breeding ground for disease.

The greater yellow-headed vulture forages using its keen eyesight to locate carrion on the ground, but also uses its sense of smell, an ability which is uncommon in the avian world. It locates carrion by detecting the scent of ethyl mercaptan, a gas produced by the beginnings of decay in dead animals. The olfactory lobe of its brain responsible for processing smells is particularly large compared to other animals. This characteristic of New World vultures has been used by humans: ethyl mercaptan is injected into pipelines, and engineers looking for leaks then follow the vultures.

King vultures, which lack the ability to smell carrion, follow the greater yellow-headed vultures to carcasses, where the king vulture tears open the skin of the dead animal. This allows the smaller greater yellow-headed vulture access to food, as it does not have a bill strong enough to tear the hide of larger animals. This is an example of mutual dependence between species. It is generally displaced from carcasses by both turkey vultures and king vultures, due to their larger size.

== Conservation ==
The greater yellow-headed vulture is listed as a species of least concern by the International Union for Conservation of Nature (IUCN). It has an estimated global range of 6,700,000 square kilometers (2,600,000 sq mi) and a population of between 100,000 and 1,000,000 individuals. There is evidence that suggests a decline in the species' population, but it is not significant enough to warrant an upgrade in conservation status.
