= Cube mold technology =

Type of plastics manufacturing process

- Process type: Injection moulding process

Cube mold technology (also known as Rotating cube mold technology or Stack-turning molding) is a molding process for the manufacture of plastics components. This molding process allows to manufacture circular parts. This technology was introduced by Foboha (a business unit of Barnes Group) and Arburg.

== Procedure ==
The cube mold technology is characterized by components that rotate vertically round the axis. The lower section of the mold runs on the machine base and the lower machine tie bars. The top section of the part runs on the upper machine tie bars. In this technology, components are molded within the rotating system at different steps. Below are the different steps:

- The initial moldings are performed in a cavity of the first parting line.
- When mold is fully open, components remain on the side of the movable middle block and can be turned into the range of the second parting line by a 90° or by a 180° turn of this middle block.
- After the mold closes again, the second component is injected into the cavity of the second parting line during which the pre-injection moldings area unit are set.
- The molded parts are removed at the fourth cycle of the operations. Cavity filling, cooling phase and parts removal are done in a parallel manner which eventually save cycle time.

== See also ==
- Molding (process)
- Metal injection molding
- Fusible core injection molding
- Multi-material injection molding
- Reaction injection molding
- Gas-assisted injection molding
- Micro injection molding
