= Gas-assisted injection molding =

Type of plastics manufacturing process

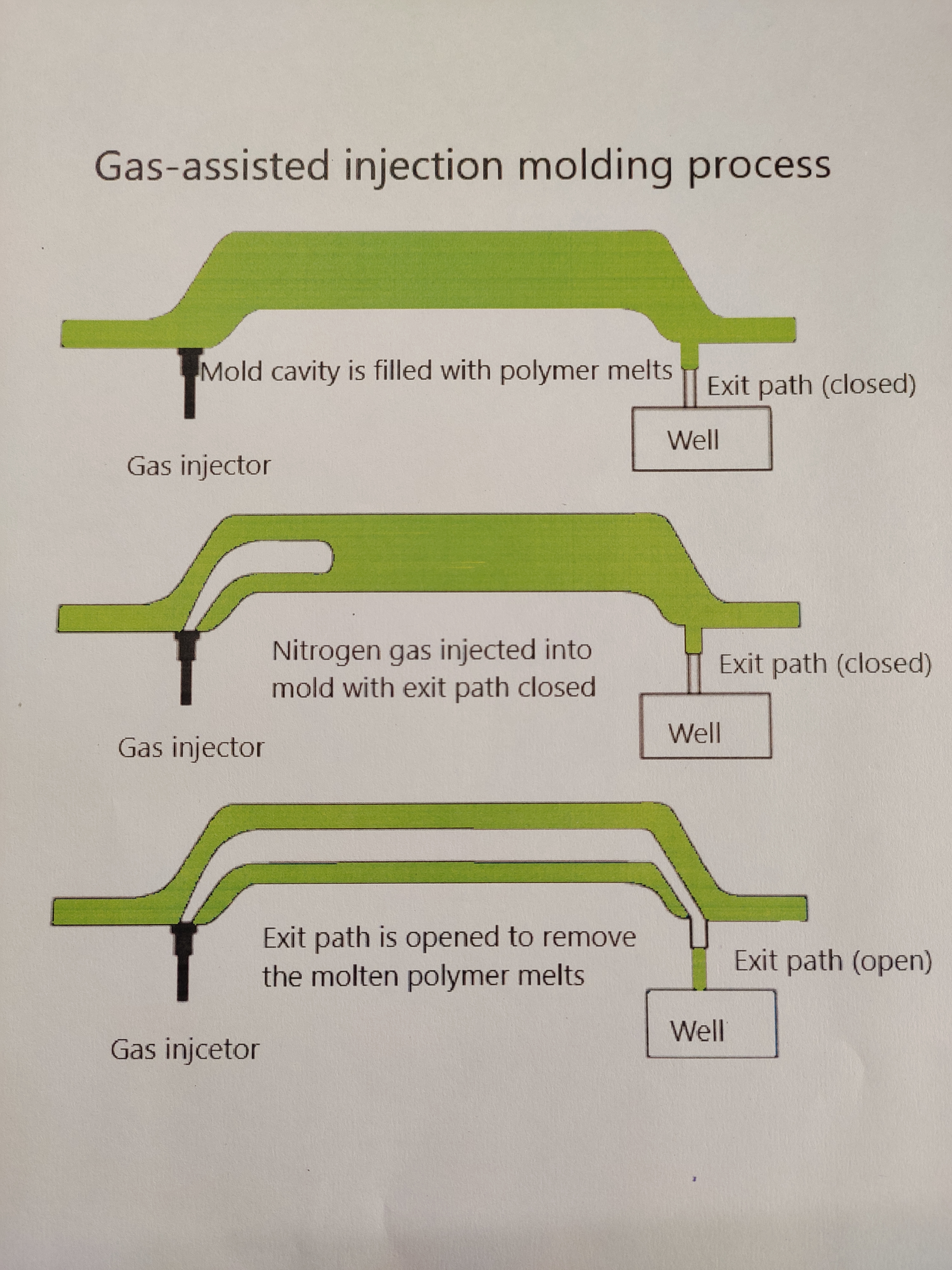
- Basic concept diagram of gas-assisted injection molding
- Process type: Injection molding process

Gas-assisted injection molding is a molding process where an inert gas is injected into the melted plastic pushing it further into the mold and resulting in hollow parts.

== Basic concept ==
Gas-assisted injection molding to provide an internal hollow shape (Green and blue colors indicate inert gas and polymer melt respectively)

The basic concept of the gas-assisted molding process is quite similar to the regular injection molding process. In gas-assisted molding, the plastic material is injected into the mold cavities like the regular injection molding process but only up to 70%~80% of the mold volume. The melted plastic in contact with the mold walls begins to solidify, then nitrogen gas is injected into the mold through strategically designed and placed gas inlets, providing pressure that pushes the plastic into the mold extremities. The path of the bubble is controlled by taking the path of least resistance through the hottest, least viscous plastic, which keeps it centered from the colder walls of the mold. Finally the molded part is ejected like the regular injection molding process.

== Advantages ==
This process forms hollow parts that are cheaper than traditionally injection molded equivalents. Molded parts also cool faster in this process. There is also usually less shrinkage as the thicker wall sections are hollow. Some of the benefits of this process are:

- Thicker parts
- Low clamp force
- Lightweight products
- Reduced part deformation (warpage)
- Minimal residual stresses
- No sink marks
- Greener

== Disadvantages ==
This molding technique is very difficult to apply to multi-cavity molds, especially if the cavity sizes are dissimilar. Clear or transparent plastic materials are an inappropriate option for this technique as the cosmetic-appearance can deteriorate.

== See also ==
- Rotational molding
- Metal injection molding
- Reaction injection molding
- Fusible core injection molding
- Multi-material injection molding
- Direct injection expanded foam molding
