= RJG =

RJG or rjg may refer to:

- Ready Jet Go!, a CGI animated television series
- RJG Inc., a training and consulting company
- Rajong language, by ISO 639 language code
- Rajgram railway station, West Bengal, by railway station code
- Robert John Godfrey, a British musician

== See also ==
- R. J. G. Savage (1927–1998), a British palaeontologist
