= Injection moulding =

Manufacturing process

Simplified diagram of the process

Injection moulding (U.S. spelling: Injection molding) is a manufacturing process for producing parts by injecting molten material into a mould, or mold. Injection moulding can be performed with a host of materials mainly including metals (for which the process is called die-casting), glasses, elastomers, confections, and most commonly thermoplastic and thermosetting polymers. Material for the part is fed into a heated barrel, mixed (using a helical screw), and injected into a mould cavity, where it cools and hardens to the configuration of the cavity. After a product is designed, usually by an industrial designer or an engineer, moulds are made by a mould-maker (or toolmaker) from metal, usually either steel or aluminium, and precision-machined to form the features of the desired part. Injection moulding is widely used for manufacturing a variety of parts, from the smallest components to entire body panels of cars. Advances in 3D printing technology, using photopolymers that do not melt during the injection moulding of some lower-temperature thermoplastics, can be used for some simple injection moulds.

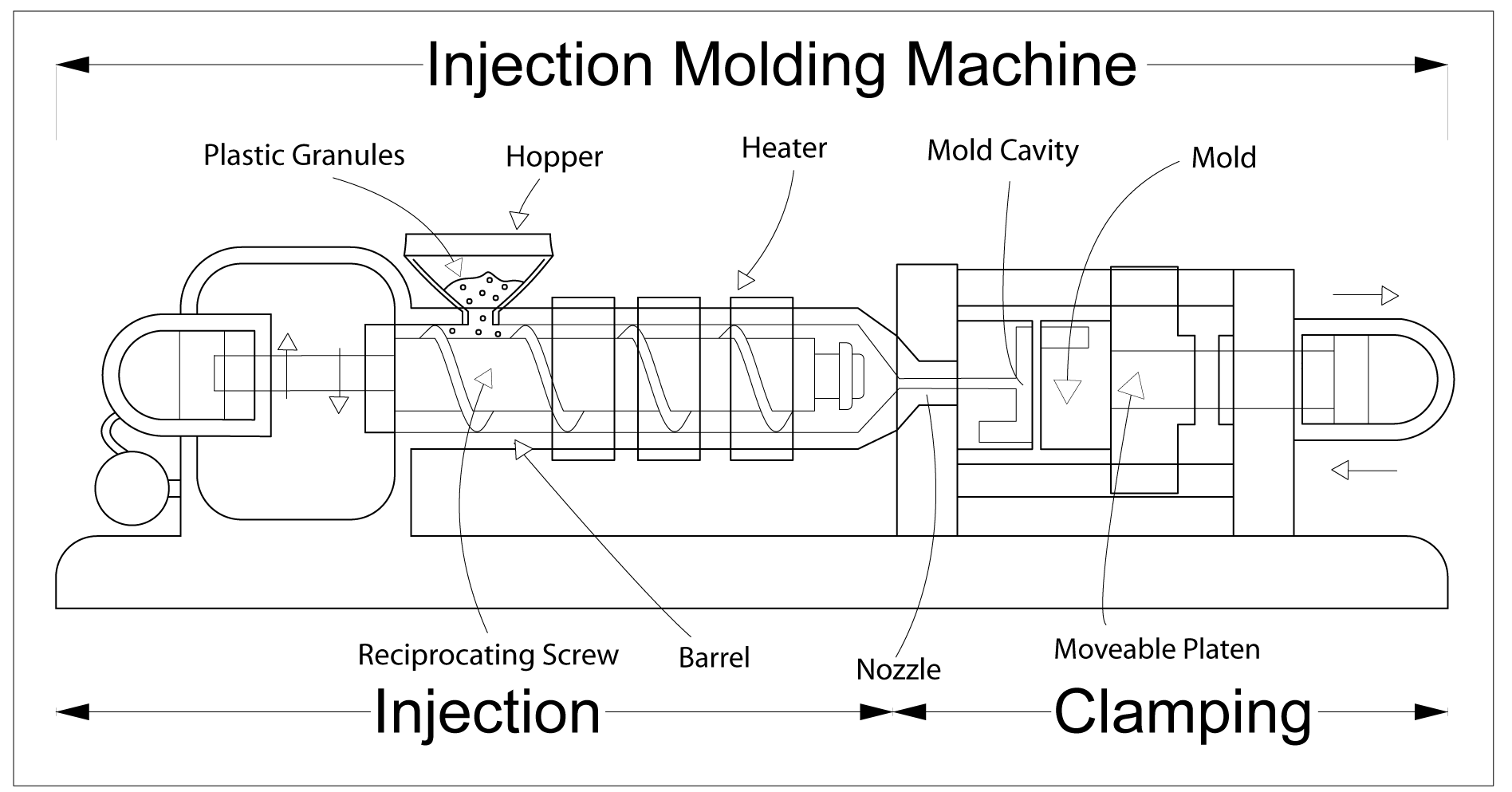
An injection moulding machine

Injection moulding uses a special-purpose machine that has three parts: the injection unit, the mould and the clamp. Parts to be injection-moulded must be carefully designed to facilitate the moulding process; the material used for the part, the desired shape and features of the part, the material of the mould, and the properties of the moulding machine must all be taken into account. The versatility of injection moulding is facilitated by this breadth of design considerations and possibilities.

== Applications ==
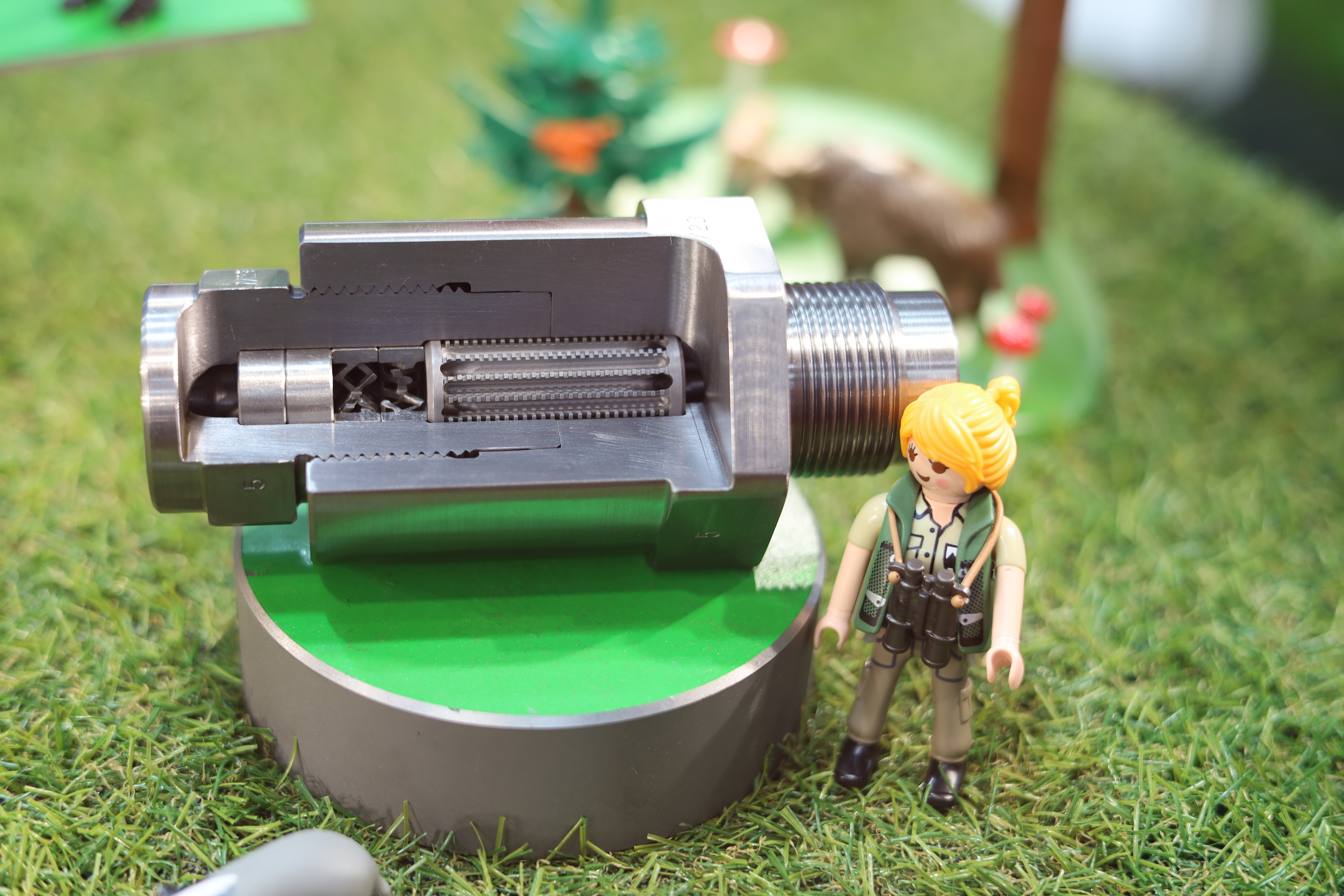
Filter for nozzle with a plastic toy next to it

Injection moulding is used to create many things such as wire spools, packaging, bottle caps, automotive parts and components, toys, pocket combs, some musical instruments (and parts of them), one-piece chairs and small tables, storage containers, mechanical parts (including gears), and most other plastic products available today. Injection moulding is the most common modern method of manufacturing plastic parts; it is ideal for producing high volumes of the same object.

== Process characteristics ==
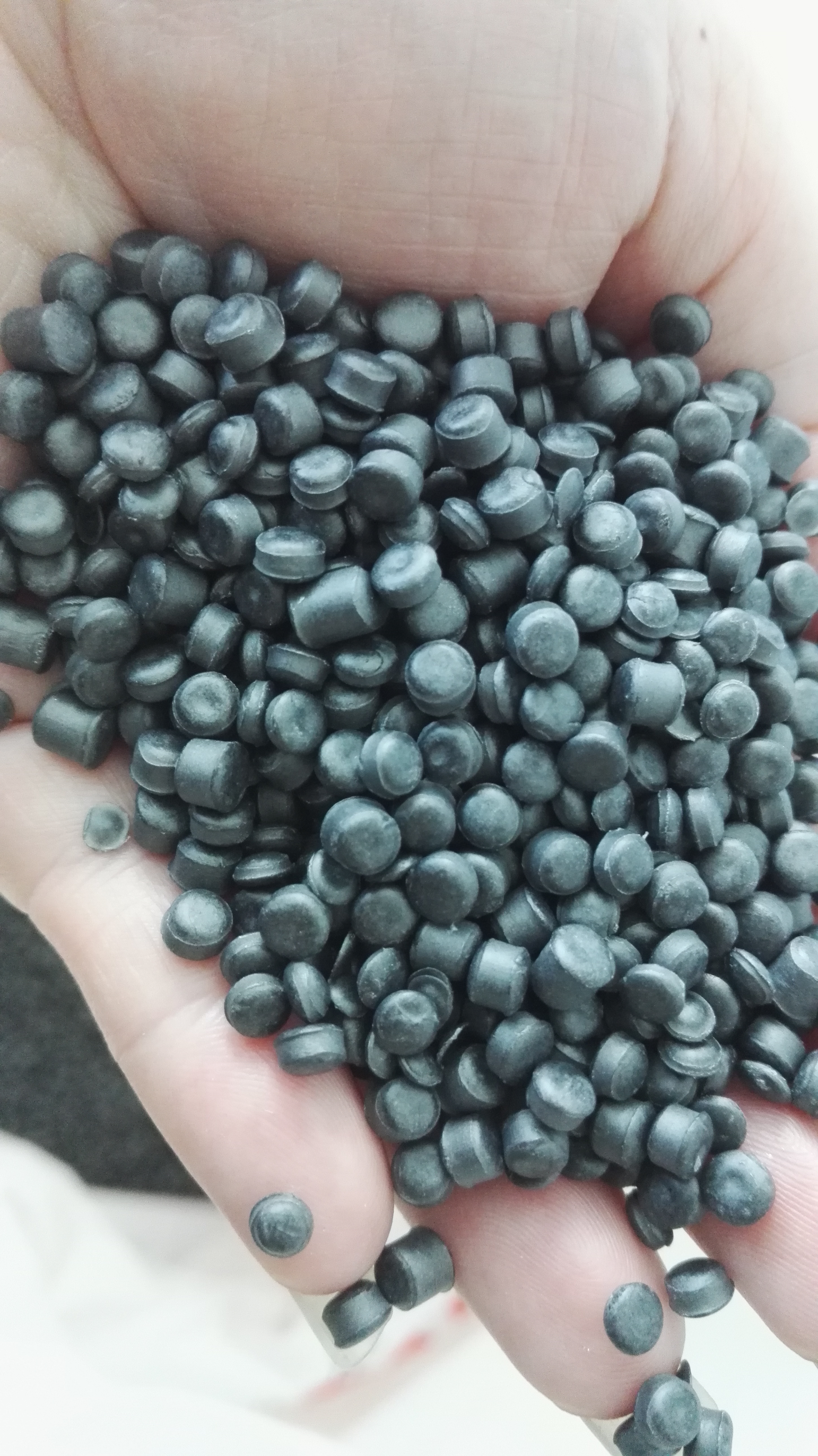
Thermoplastic resin pellets for injection moulding

Injection moulding uses a ram or screw-type plunger to force molten plastic or rubber material into a mould cavity; this solidifies into a shape that has conformed to the contour of the mould. It is most commonly used to process both thermoplastic and thermosetting polymers, with the volume used of the former being considerably higher. Thermoplastics are prevalent due to characteristics that make them highly suitable for injection moulding, such as ease of recycling, versatility for a wide variety of applications, and ability to soften and flow on heating. Thermoplastics also have an element of safety over thermosets; if a thermosetting polymer is not ejected from the injection barrel in a timely manner, chemical crosslinking may occur causing the screw and check valves to seize and potentially damaging the injection moulding machine.

Injection moulding consists of the high pressure injection of the raw material into a mould, which shapes the polymer into the desired form. Moulds can be of a single cavity or multiple cavities. In multiple cavity moulds, each cavity can be identical and form the same parts or can be unique and form multiple different geometries during a single cycle. Moulds are generally made from tool steels, but stainless steels and aluminium moulds are suitable for certain applications. Aluminium moulds are typically ill-suited for high volume production or parts with narrow dimensional tolerances, as they have inferior mechanical properties and are more prone to wear, damage, and deformation during the injection and clamping cycles; however, aluminium moulds are cost-effective in low-volume applications, as mould fabrication costs and time are considerably reduced. Many steel moulds are designed to process well over a million parts during their lifetime and can cost hundreds of thousands of dollars to fabricate.

When thermoplastics are moulded, typically pelletised raw material is fed through a hopper into a heated barrel with a reciprocating screw. Upon entrance to the barrel, the temperature increases and the Van der Waals forces that resist relative flow of individual chains are weakened as a result of increased space between molecules at higher thermal energy states. This process reduces its viscosity, which enables the polymer to flow with the driving force of the injection unit. The screw delivers the raw material forward, mixes and homogenises the thermal and viscous distributions of the polymer, and reduces the required heating time by mechanically shearing the material and adding a significant amount of frictional heating to the polymer. The material feeds forward through a check valve and collects at the front of the screw into a volume known as a shot. A shot is the volume of material that is used to fill the mould cavity, compensate for shrinkage, and provide a cushion (approximately 10% of the total shot volume, which remains in the barrel and prevents the screw from bottoming out) to transfer pressure from the screw to the mould cavity. When enough material has gathered, the material is forced at high pressure and velocity into the part forming cavity. The exact amount of shrinkage is a function of the resin being used, and can be relatively predictable. To prevent spikes in pressure, the process normally uses a transfer position corresponding to a 95–98% full cavity where the screw shifts from a constant velocity to a constant pressure control. Often injection times are well under 1 second. Once the screw reaches the transfer position the packing pressure is applied, which completes mould filling and compensates for thermal shrinkage, which is quite high for thermoplastics relative to many other materials. The packing pressure is applied until the gate (cavity entrance) solidifies. Due to its small size, the gate is normally the first place to solidify through its entire thickness. Once the gate solidifies, no more material can enter the cavity; accordingly, the screw reciprocates and acquires material for the next cycle while the material within the mould cools so that it can be ejected and be dimensionally stable. This cooling duration is dramatically reduced by the use of cooling lines circulating water or oil from an external temperature controller. Once the required temperature has been achieved, the mould opens and an array of pins, sleeves, strippers, etc. are driven forward to demould the article. Then, the mould closes and the process is repeated.

For a two-shot mould, two separate materials are incorporated into one part. This type of injection moulding is used to add a soft touch to knobs, to give a product multiple colours, or to produce a part with multiple performance characteristics.

For thermosets, typically two different chemical components are injected into the barrel. These components immediately begin irreversible chemical reactions that eventually crosslinks the material into a single connected network of molecules. As the chemical reaction occurs, the two fluid components permanently transform into a viscoelastic solid. Solidification in the injection barrel and screw can be problematic and have financial repercussions; therefore, minimising the thermoset curing within the barrel is vital. This typically means that the residence time and temperature of the chemical precursors are minimised in the injection unit. The residence time can be reduced by minimising the barrel's volume capacity and by maximising the cycle times. These factors have led to the use of a thermally isolated, cold injection unit that injects the reacting chemicals into a thermally isolated hot mould, which increases the rate of chemical reactions and results in shorter time required to achieve a solidified thermoset component. After the part has solidified, valves close to isolate the injection system and chemical precursors, and the mould opens to eject the moulded parts. Then, the mould closes and the process repeats.

Pre-moulded or machined components can be inserted into the cavity while the mould is open, allowing the material injected in the next cycle to form and solidify around them. This process is known as insert moulding and allows single parts to contain multiple materials. This process is often used to create plastic parts with protruding metal screws so they can be fastened and unfastened repeatedly. This technique can also be used for In-mould labelling and film lids may also be attached to moulded plastic containers.

A parting line, sprue, gate marks, and ejector pin marks are usually present on the final part. None of these features are typically desired, but are unavoidable due to the nature of the process. Gate marks occur at the gate that joins the melt-delivery channels (sprue and runner) to the part forming cavity. Parting line and ejector pin marks result from minute misalignments, wear, gaseous vents, clearances for adjacent parts in relative motion, and/or dimensional differences of the melting surfaces contacting the injected polymer. Dimensional differences can be attributed to non-uniform, pressure-induced deformation during injection, machining tolerances, and non-uniform thermal expansion and contraction of mould components, which experience rapid cycling during the injection, packing, cooling, and ejection phases of the process. Mould components are often designed with materials of various coefficients of thermal expansion. These factors cannot be simultaneously accounted for without astronomical increases in the cost of design, fabrication, processing, and quality monitoring. The skillful mould and part designer positions these aesthetic detriments in hidden areas if feasible.

== Advanced and Hybrid Injection Molding Techniques ==
Woven fabric reinforced thermoplastic composites are a result of embedding a composite material such as glass, carbon, or natural fibers that are made of woven fabric, in a thermoplastic polymer matrix. They are considered a lightweight alternative to metal in industries requiring high stiffness and strength. These composites are generally made using a two-step system involving prepreg and then molding the final product. With the advancements in injection molding processes, the composites can be fabricated in a single step process.

There are also hybrid approaches that combine injection molding and other techniques. A hybrid approach can encourage process flexibility, and can optimize the mechanical properties of the composites by extension. Some composites have a tensile strength increase of 4.18 times more compared to the base polymer matrix. For automotive applications, advances like these allow a better production of parts with customized properties.

== History ==
In 1834 a British patent for the injection moulding of candles was filed by a pewterer called Joseph Morgan.

In 1846 the British inventor Charles Hancock, a relative of Thomas Hancock, patented an injection moulding machine.

American inventor John Wesley Hyatt, together with his brother Isaiah, patented one of the first injection moulding machines in 1872. This machine was relatively simple compared to machines in use today: it worked like a large hypodermic needle, using a plunger to inject plastic through a heated cylinder into a mould. The industry progressed slowly over the years, producing products such as collar stays, buttons, and hair combs (generally though, plastics, in its modern definition, are a more recent development c. 1950s).

The German chemists Arthur Eichengrün and Theodore Becker invented the first soluble forms of cellulose acetate in 1903, which was much less flammable than cellulose nitrate. It was eventually made available in a powder form from which it was readily injection moulded. Arthur Eichengrün developed the first injection moulding press in 1919. In 1939, Arthur Eichengrün patented the injection moulding of plasticised cellulose acetate.

The industry expanded rapidly in the 1940s because World War II created a huge demand for inexpensive, mass-produced products. In 1946, American inventor James Watson Hendry built the first screw injection machine, which allowed much more precise control over the speed of injection and the quality of articles produced. This machine also allowed material to be mixed before injection, so that coloured or recycled plastic could be added to virgin material and mixed thoroughly before being injected. In the 1970s, Hendry went on to develop the first gas-assisted injection moulding process, which permitted the production of complex, hollow articles that cooled quickly. This greatly improved design flexibility as well as the strength and finish of manufactured parts while reducing production time, cost, weight and waste. By 1979, plastic production overtook steel production, and by 1990, aluminium moulds were widely used in injection moulding. Today, screw injection machines account for the vast majority of all injection machines.

The plastic injection moulding industry has evolved over the years from producing combs and buttons to producing a vast array of products for many industries including automotive, medical, aerospace, consumer products, toys, plumbing, packaging, and construction.

In France, 1979, St. Gobain-Vetrotex, Billon, and SEVA developed a new thermoset injection molding technique. The ZMC process is a significant advancement in composite manufacturing. It combines polymer compounds with a screw/plunger hybrid injection machine. The ZMC process allowed large scale productions in the automotive department, particularly the rear doors being produced at 1,000 per day. It also reduced labor requirements and enhanced surface quality.

== Examples of polymers best suited for the process ==
Most polymers, sometimes referred to as resins, may be used, including all thermoplastics, some thermosets, and some elastomers. Since 1995, the total number of available materials for injection moulding has increased at a rate of 750 per year; there were approximately 18,000 materials available when that trend began. Available materials include alloys or blends of previously developed materials, so product designers can choose the material with the best set of properties from a vast selection. Major criteria for selection of a material are the strength and function required for the final part, as well as the cost, but also each material has different parameters for moulding that must be taken into account. Other considerations when choosing an injection moulding material include flexural modulus of elasticity, or the degree to which a material can be bent without damage, as well as heat deflection and water absorption. Common polymers like epoxy and phenolic are examples of thermosetting plastics while nylon, polyethylene, and polystyrene are thermoplastic. Until comparatively recently, plastic springs were not possible, but advances in polymer properties make them now quite practical. Applications include buckles for anchoring and disconnecting outdoor-equipment webbing.

== Sustainability Aspects ==
Although plastics are not considered sustainable, efficient steps such as process improvements, material management, and design strategies can prove to be sustainable in production manufacturing. Some companies have taken the initiative to include automated regrind systems to the process. These systems can collect and recycle scrap materials, and feed it back into molding presses without major process changes. Companies have been able to reduce their landfill contributions to less than 1% of materials used.

The upgrade to modern injection molding presses, including electric and hybrid machines, reduces energy consumption while increasing production by 20% more than the traditional machines.

Adding filtration systems in the cooling systems will allow processed water to be recycled into the cooling towers, minimizing water, water consumption, and environmental impacts.

An important factor is the material selection. When designing parts, monomaterials allow assemblies to be recycled as a whole, reducing contamination issues and simplifying end-of-life processing.

== Equipment ==
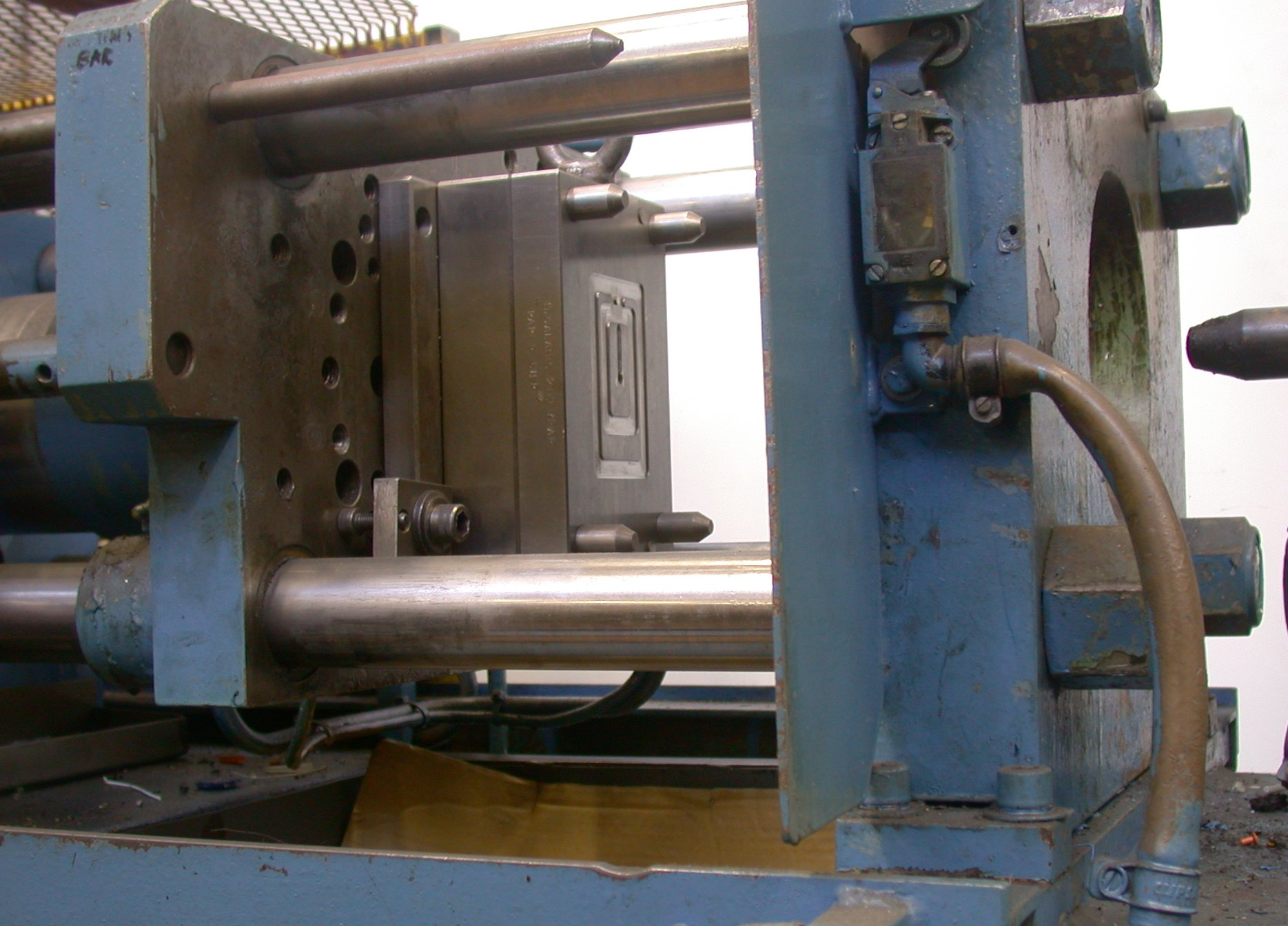
Paper clip mould opened in injection moulding machine; the nozzle is visible at right

Injection moulding machines consist of a material hopper, an injection ram or screw-type plunger, and a heating unit. Also known as platens, they hold the moulds in which the components are shaped. Presses are rated by tonnage, which expresses the amount of clamping force that the machine can exert. This force keeps the mould closed during the injection process. Tonnage can vary from less than 5 tons to over 9,000 tons, with the higher figures used in comparatively few manufacturing operations. The total clamp force needed is determined by the projected area of the part being moulded. This projected area is multiplied by a clamp force of from 1.8 to 7.2 tons for each square centimetre of the projected areas. As a rule of thumb, 4 or 5 tons/in^{2} can be used for most products. If the plastic material is very stiff, it requires more injection pressure to fill the mould, and thus more clamp tonnage to hold the mould closed. The required force can also be determined by the material used and the size of the part. Larger parts require higher clamping force.

=== Mould ===
Mould or die are the common terms used to describe the tool used to produce plastic parts in moulding.

Since moulds have been expensive to manufacture, they were usually only used in mass production where thousands of parts were being produced. Typical moulds are constructed from hardened steel, pre-hardened steel, aluminium, and/or beryllium-copper alloy. The choice of material for the mold is not only based on cost considerations, but also has a lot to do with the product life cycle. In general, steel moulds cost more to construct, but their longer lifespan offsets the higher initial cost over a higher number of parts made before wearing out. Pre-hardened steel moulds are less wear-resistant and are used for lower volume requirements or larger components; their typical steel hardness is 38–45 on the Rockwell-C scale. Hardened steel moulds are heat treated after machining; these are by far superior in terms of wear resistance and lifespan. Typical hardness ranges between 50 and 60 Rockwell-C (HRC). Aluminium moulds can cost substantially less, and when designed and machined with modern computerised equipment can be economical for moulding tens or even hundreds of thousands of parts. Beryllium copper is used in areas of the mould that require fast heat removal or areas that see the most shear heat generated. The moulds can be manufactured either by CNC machining or by using electrical discharge machining processes.

Injection moulding die with side pulls

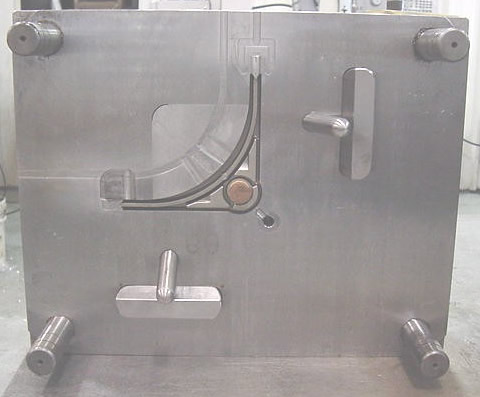
"A" side of die for 25% glass-filled acetal with 2 side pulls

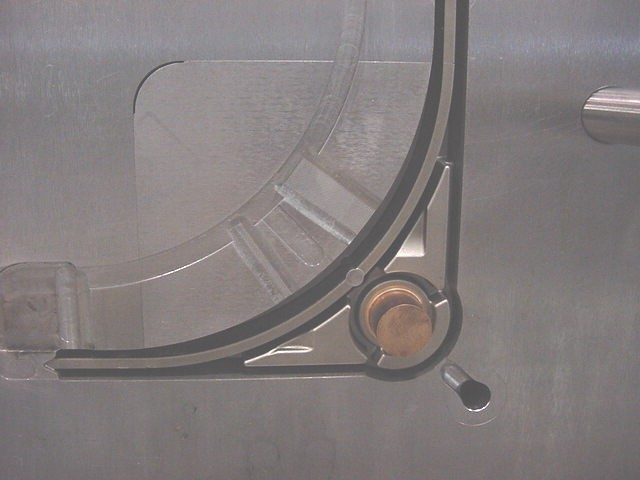
Close up of removable insert in "A" side

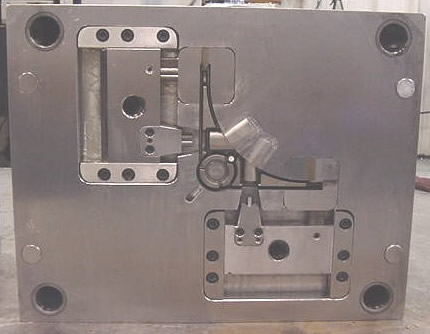
"B" side of die with side pull actuators

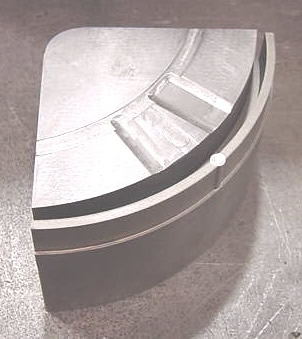
Insert removed from die

==== Mould design ====
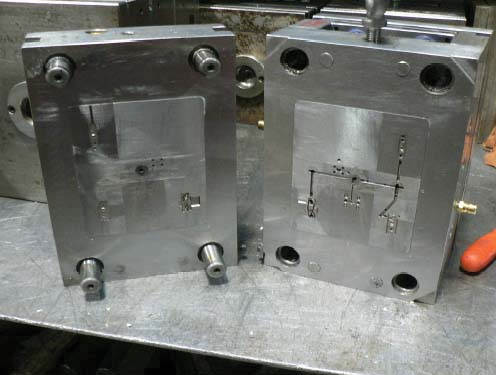
Standard two plates tooling – core and cavity are inserts in a mould base – "family mould" of five different parts.

The mould consists of two primary components, the injection mould (A plate) and the ejector mould (B plate). These components are also referred to as moulder and mouldmaker. Plastic resin enters the mould through a sprue or gate in the injection mould; the sprue bushing is to seal tightly against the nozzle of the injection barrel of the moulding machine and to allow molten plastic to flow from the barrel into the mould, also known as the cavity. The sprue bushing directs the molten plastic to the cavity images through channels that are machined into the faces of the A and B plates. These channels allow plastic to run along them, so they are referred to as runners. The molten plastic flows through the runner and enters one or more specialised gates and into the cavity geometry to form the desired part.

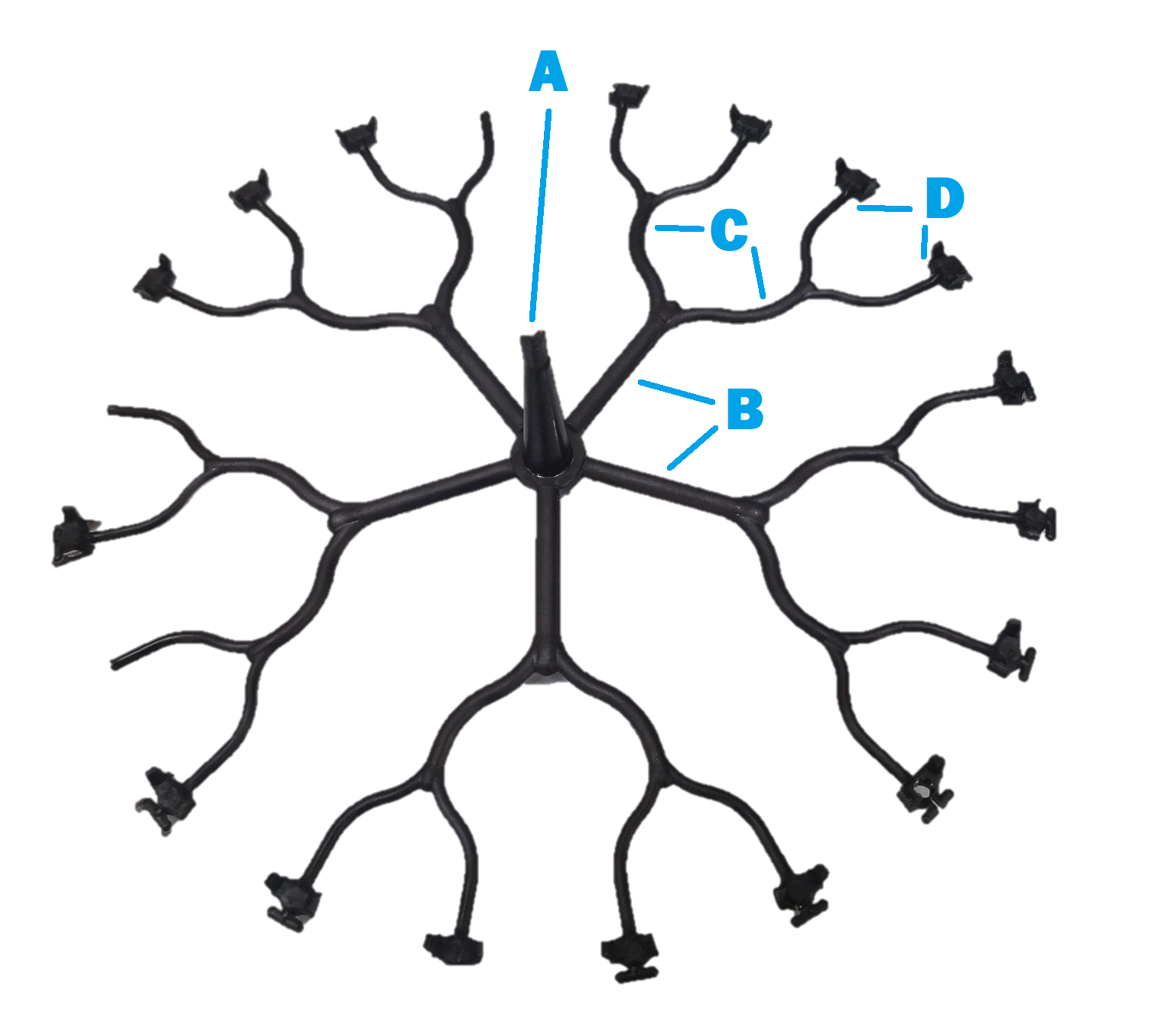
(A) Sprue, (B)&(C)runner and (D)gates in actual injection moulding product for toys

The amount of resin required to fill the sprue, runner and cavities of a mould comprises a "shot". Trapped air in the mould can escape through air vents that are ground into the parting line of the mould, or around ejector pins and slides that are slightly smaller than the holes retaining them. If the trapped air is not allowed to escape, it is compressed by the pressure of the incoming material and squeezed into the corners of the cavity, where it prevents filling and can also cause other defects. The air can even become so compressed that it ignites and burns the surrounding plastic material.

To allow for removal of the moulded part from the mould, the mould features must not overhang one another in the direction that the mould opens, unless parts of the mould are designed to move from between such overhangs when the mould opens using components called Lifters.

Sides of the part that appear parallel with the direction of draw (the axis of the cored position (hole) or insert is parallel to the up and down movement of the mould as it opens and closes) are typically angled slightly, called draft, to ease release of the part from the mould. Insufficient draft can cause deformation or damage. The draft required for mould release is primarily dependent on the depth of the cavity; the deeper the cavity, the more draft necessary. Shrinkage must also be taken into account when determining the draft required. If the skin is too thin, then the moulded part tends to shrink onto the cores that form while cooling and cling to those cores, or the part may warp, twist, blister or crack when the cavity is pulled away.

A mould is usually designed so that the moulded part reliably remains on the ejector (B) side of the mould when it opens, and draws the runner and the sprue out of the (A) side along with the parts. The part then falls freely when ejected from the (B) side. Tunnel gates, also known as submarine or mould gates, are located below the parting line or mould surface. An opening is machined into the surface of the mould on the parting line. The moulded part is cut (by the mould) from the runner system on ejection from the mould. Ejector pins, also known as knockout pins, are circular pins placed in either half of the mould (usually the ejector half), which push the finished moulded product, or runner system out of a mould. The ejection of the article using pins, sleeves, strippers, etc., may cause undesirable impressions or distortion, so care must be taken when designing the mould.

The standard method of cooling is passing a coolant (usually water) through a series of holes drilled through the mould plates and connected by hoses to form a continuous pathway. The coolant absorbs heat from the mould (which has absorbed heat from the hot plastic) and keeps the mould at a proper temperature to solidify the plastic at the most efficient rate.

To ease maintenance and venting, cavities and cores are divided into pieces, called inserts, and sub-assemblies, also called inserts, blocks, or chase blocks. By substituting interchangeable inserts, one mould may make several variations of the same part.

More complex parts are formed using more complex moulds. These may have sections called slides, that move into a cavity perpendicular to the draw direction, to form overhanging part features. When the mould is opened, the slides are pulled away from the plastic part by using stationary "angle pins" on the stationary mould half. These pins enter a slot in the slides and cause the slides to move backward when the moving half of the mould opens. The part is then ejected and the mould closes. The closing action of the mould causes the slides to move forward along the angle pins.

A mould can produce several copies of the same parts in a single "shot". The number of "impressions" in the mould of that part is often incorrectly referred to as cavitation. A tool with one impression is often called a single impression (cavity) mould. A mould with two or more cavities of the same parts is usually called a multiple impression (cavity) mould. (Not to be confused with "Multi-shot moulding" {which is dealt with in the next section.}) Some extremely high production volume moulds (like those for bottle caps) can have over 128 cavities.

In some cases, multiple cavity tooling moulds a series of different parts in the same tool. Some toolmakers call these moulds family moulds, as all the parts are related—e.g., plastic model kits.

Some moulds allow previously moulded parts to be reinserted to allow a new plastic layer to form around the first part. This is often referred to as overmoulding. This system can allow for production of one-piece tires and wheels.

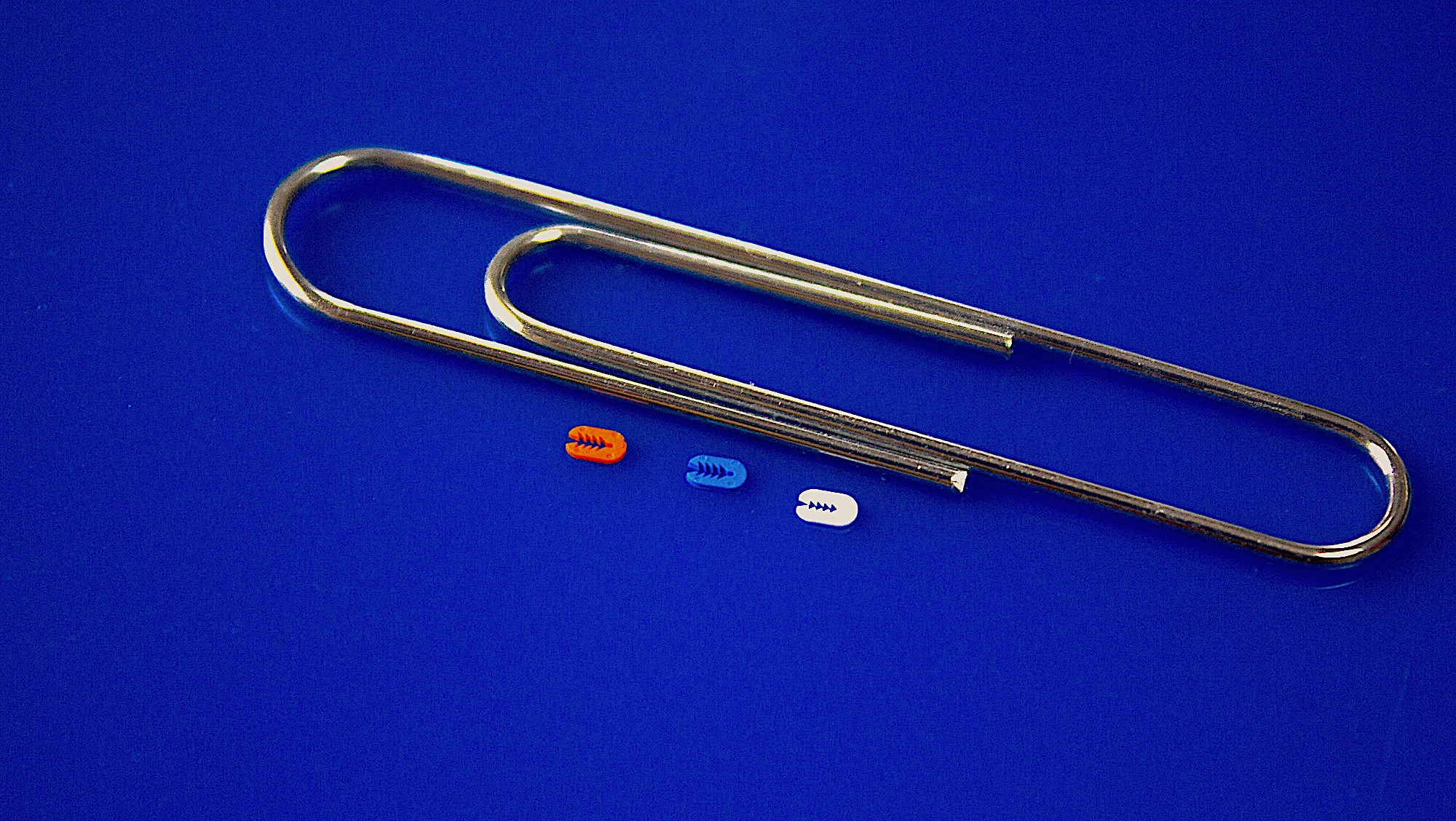
Micro injection molding can help create extremely precise part with micro features.

Moulds for highly precise and extremely small parts from micro injection molding requires extra care in the design stage, as material resins react differently compared to their full-sized counterparts where they must quickly fill these incredibly small spaces, which puts them under intense shear strains.

===== Multi-shot moulding =====
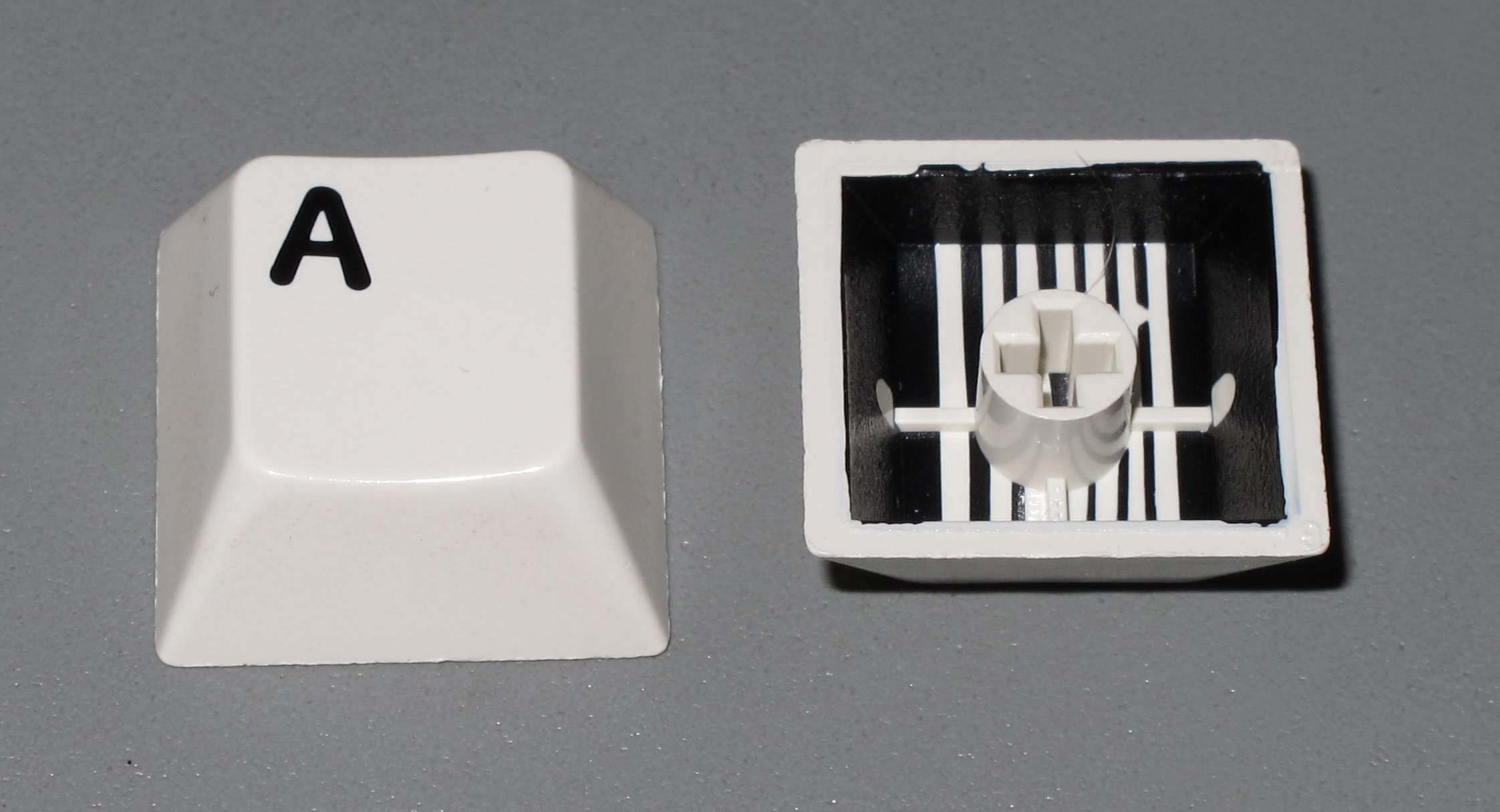
Two-shot injection moulded keycaps from a computer keyboard

Two-shot, double-shot or multi-shot moulds are designed to "overmould" within a single moulding cycle and must be processed on specialised injection moulding machines with two or more injection units. This process is actually an injection moulding process performed twice and therefore can allow only for a much smaller margin of error. In the first step, the base colour material is moulded into a basic shape, which contains spaces for the second shot. Then the second material, a different colour, is injection-moulded into those spaces. Pushbuttons and keys, for instance, made by this process have markings that cannot wear off, and remain legible with heavy use.

==== Mould storage ====
Manufacturers take extreme measures to protect custom moulds due to their high average costs. The optimal temperature and humidity levels are maintained to ensure the longest possible lifespan for each custom mould. Custom moulds, such as those used for rubber injection moulding, are stored in temperature and humidity controlled environments to prevent warping.

=== Tool materials ===
Tool steel is often used. Mild steel, aluminium, nickel or epoxy are suitable only for prototype or very short production runs. Modern hard aluminium (7075 and 2024 alloys) with proper mould design, can easily make moulds capable of 100,000 or more part life with proper mould maintenance.

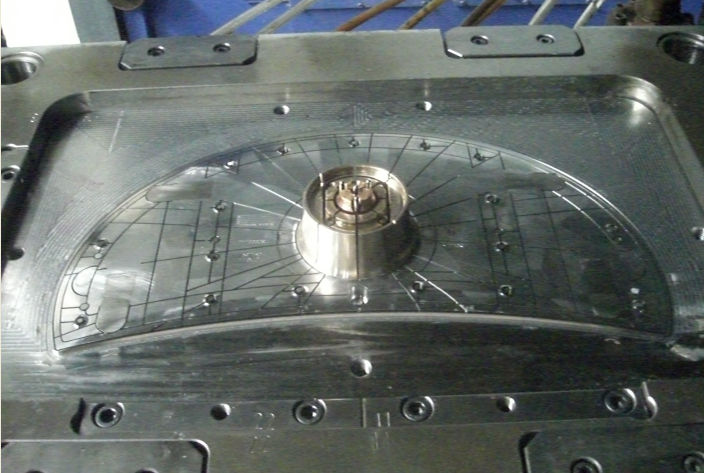
Beryllium-copper insert (yellow) on injection moulding mould for ABS resin

=== Machining ===
Moulds are built through two main methods: standard machining and EDM. Standard machining, in its conventional form, has historically been the method of building injection moulds. With technological developments, CNC machining became the predominant means of making more complex moulds with more accurate mould details in less time than traditional methods.

The electrical discharge machining (EDM) or spark erosion process has become widely used in mould making. As well as allowing the formation of shapes that are difficult to machine, the process allows pre-hardened moulds to be shaped so that no heat treatment is required. Changes to a hardened mould by conventional drilling and milling normally require annealing to soften the mould, followed by heat treatment to harden it again. EDM is a simple process in which a shaped electrode, usually made of copper or graphite, is very slowly lowered onto the mould surface over a period of many hours, which is immersed in paraffin oil (kerosene). A voltage applied between tool and mould causes spark erosion of the mould surface in the inverse shape of the electrode.

=== Cost ===
The number of cavities incorporated into a mould directly correlate in moulding costs. Fewer cavities require far less tooling work, so limiting the number of cavities lowers initial manufacturing costs to build an injection mould.

As the number of cavities play a vital role in moulding costs, so does the complexity of the part's design. Complexity can be incorporated into many factors such as surface finishing, tolerance requirements, internal or external threads, fine detailing or the number of undercuts that may be incorporated.

Further details, such as undercuts, or any feature that needs additional tooling, increases mould cost. Surface finish of the core and cavity of moulds further influences cost.

Rubber injection moulding process produces a high yield of durable products, making it the most efficient and cost-effective method of moulding. Consistent vulcanisation processes involving precise temperature control significantly reduces all waste material.

== Injection process ==
Video explanation

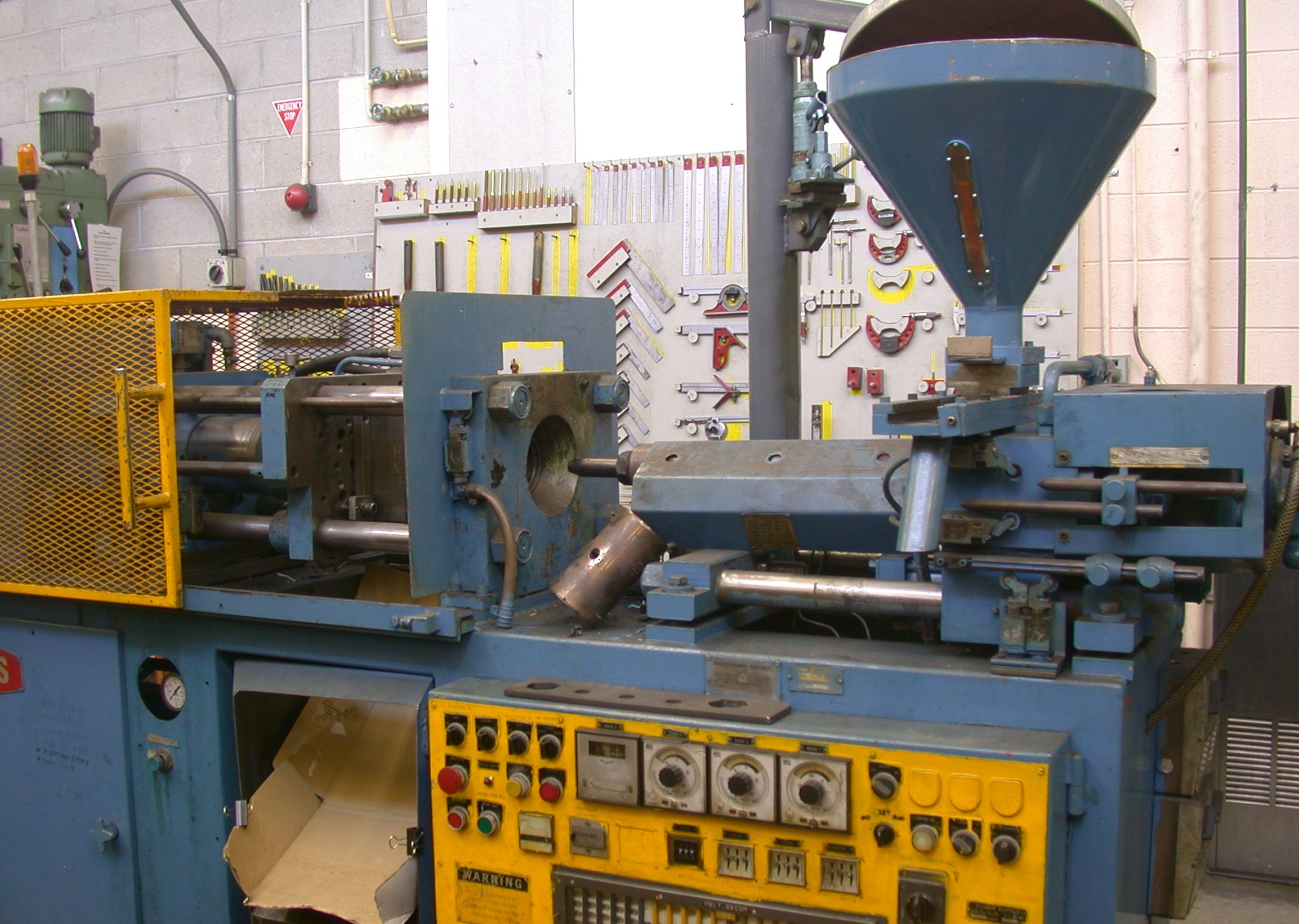
Small injection moulding machine showing hopper, nozzle and die area

Usually, the plastic materials are formed in the shape of pellets or granules and sent from the raw material manufacturers in paper bags. With injection moulding, pre-dried granular plastic is fed by a forced ram from a hopper into a heated barrel. As the granules are slowly moved forward by a screw-type plunger, the plastic is forced into a heated chamber, where it is melted. As the plunger advances, the melted plastic is forced through a nozzle that rests against the mould, allowing it to enter the mould cavity through a gate and runner system. The mould remains cold so the plastic solidifies almost as soon as the mould is filled.

=== Injection moulding cycle ===
The sequence of events during the injection mould of a plastic part is called the injection moulding cycle. The cycle begins when the mould closes, followed by the injection of the polymer into the mould cavity. Once the cavity is filled, a holding pressure is maintained to compensate for material shrinkage. In the next step, the screw turns, feeding the next shot to the front screw. This causes the screw to retract as the next shot is prepared. Once the part is sufficiently cool, the mould opens and the part is ejected.

=== Scientific versus traditional moulding ===
Traditionally, the injection portion of the moulding process was done at one constant pressure to fill and pack the cavity. This method, however, allowed for a large variation in dimensions from cycle-to-cycle. More commonly used now is scientific or decoupled moulding, a method pioneered by RJG Inc. In this the injection of the plastic is "decoupled" into stages to allow better control of part dimensions and more cycle-to-cycle (commonly called shot-to-shot in the industry) consistency. First the cavity is filled to approximately 98% full using velocity (speed) control. Although the pressure should be sufficient to allow for the desired speed, pressure limitations during this stage are undesirable. Once the cavity is 98% full, the machine switches from velocity control to pressure control, where the cavity is "packed out" at a constant pressure, where sufficient velocity to reach desired pressures is required. This lets workers control part dimensions to within thousandths of an inch or better.

=== Different types of injection moulding processes ===
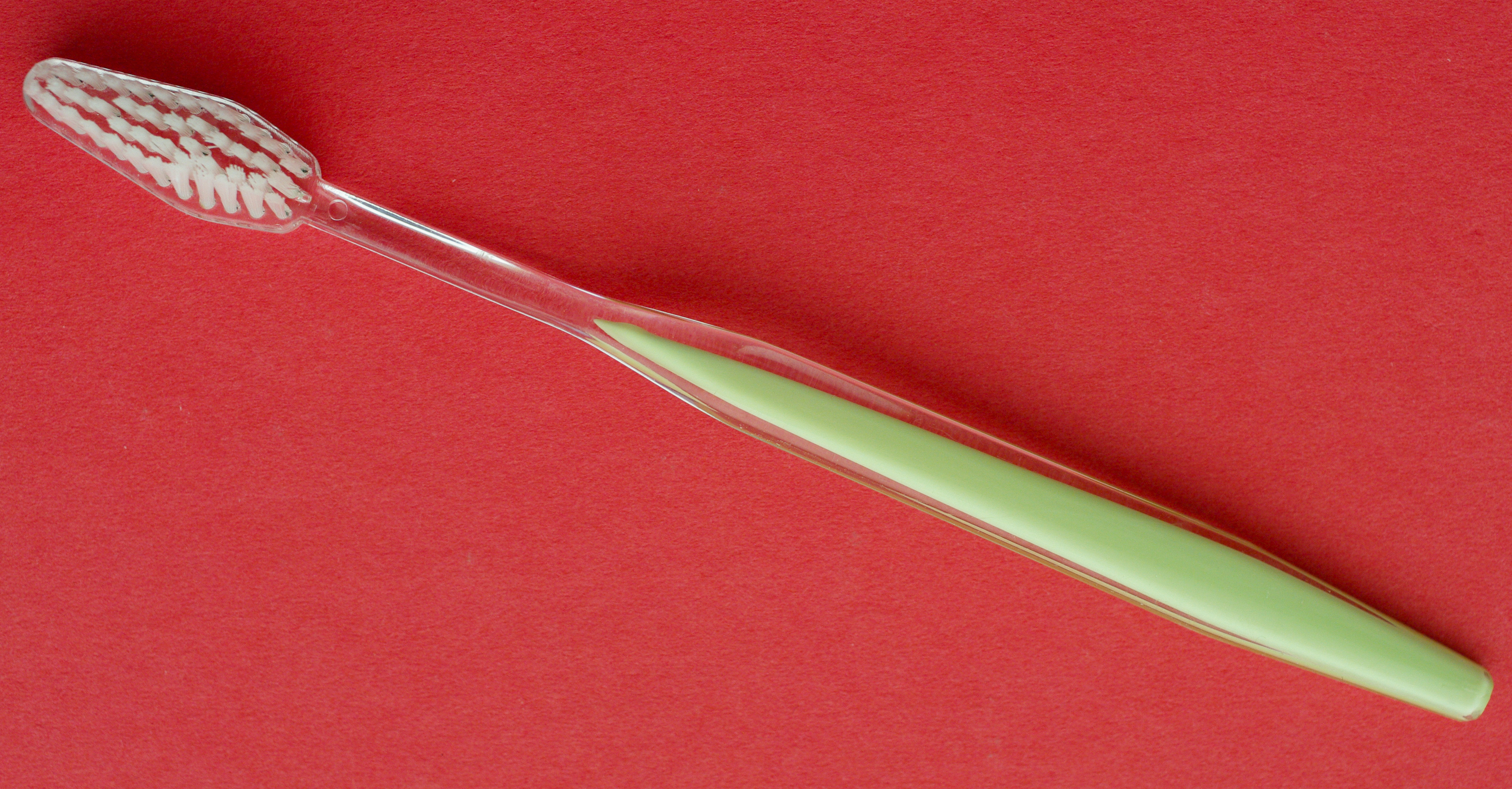
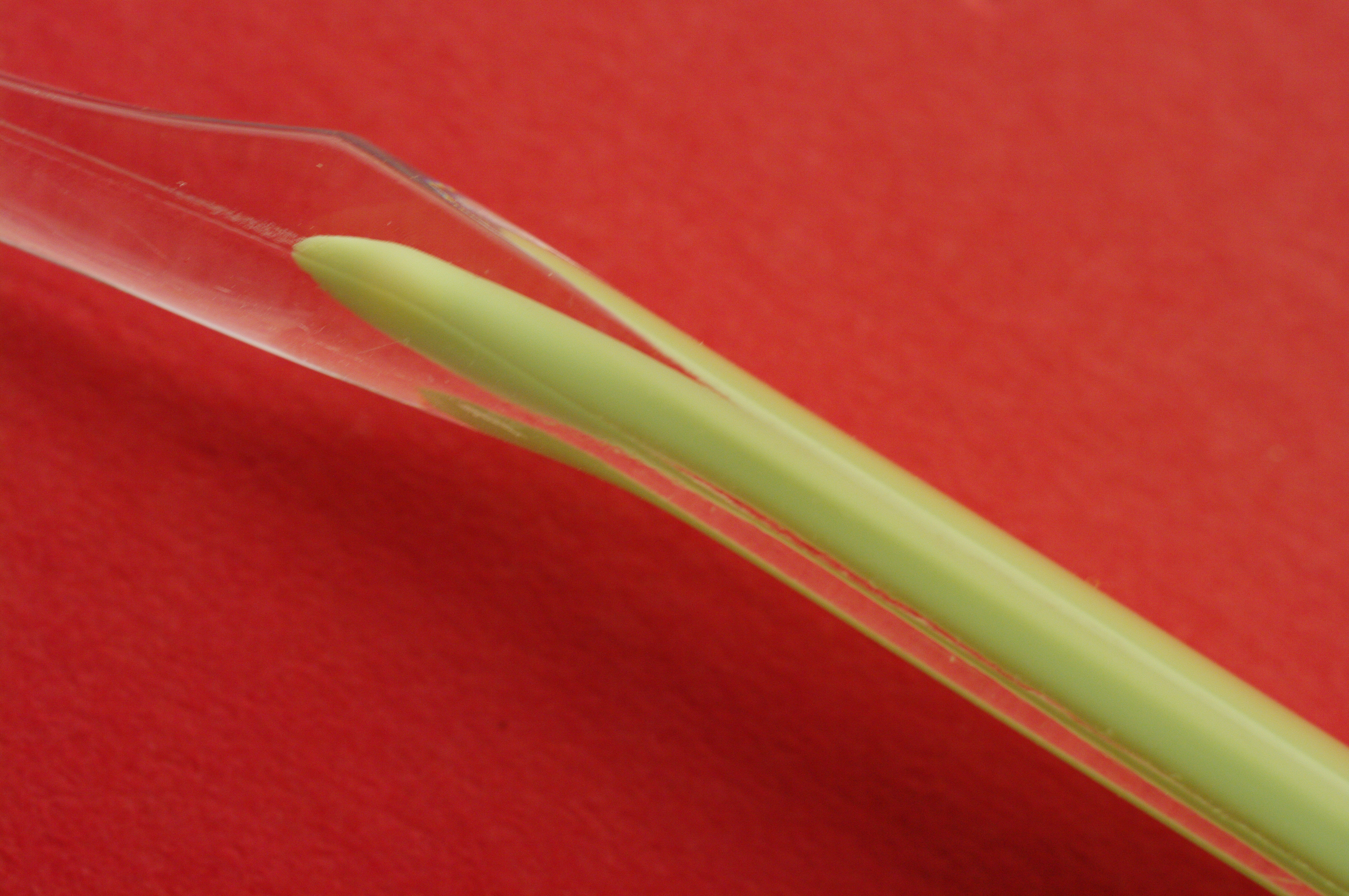
Sandwich-moulded toothbrush handle

Although most injection moulding processes are covered by the conventional process description above, there are several important moulding variations including, but not limited to:

- Die casting
- Metal injection moulding
- Thin-wall injection moulding
- Injection moulding of liquid silicone rubber
- Reaction injection moulding
- Micro injection moulding
- Gas-assisted injection moulding
- Cube mold technology
- Multi-material injection molding

A more comprehensive list of injection moulding processes may be found here: Injection Molding Handbook

== Process troubleshooting ==
Like all industrial processes, injection molding can produce flawed parts, even in toys. In the field of injection moulding, troubleshooting is often performed by examining defective parts for specific defects and addressing these defects with the design of the mould or the characteristics of the process itself. Trials are often performed before full production runs in an effort to predict defects and determine the appropriate specifications to use in the injection process.

When filling a new or unfamiliar mould for the first time, where shot size for that mould is unknown, a technician/tool setter may perform a trial run before a full production run. They start with a small shot weight and fills gradually until the mould is 95 to 99% full. Once they achieve this, they apply a small amount of holding pressure and increase holding time until gate freeze off (solidification time) has occurred. To determine the gate freeze-off time, gradually increase the hold time and weigh the resulting part. Once the part's weight stops changing, the gate has fully solidified, preventing any additional material from entering. Gate solidification time is critical because it dictates your overall cycle time, product quality, and dimensional consistency, which itself is an important issue in the economics of the production process. Holding pressure is increased until the parts are free of sinks and part weight has been achieved.

=== Material impacts ===
Injection moulding can have effects on the integrity and composition of a material. In some cases, it can effect physical properties such as their impact tolerance. Therefore, compression molding can be considered an advantage depending on the requirements of a product. Fiber-reinforced composites are usually negatively impacted in injection molding processes due to fiber degradation and the direction of the fiber. Although injection molding has been used for automotive parts such as the rear end doors, and the front-end panels, since the eighties, compression molding can be considered with that specific material. There are technical strategies to reduce the loss of physical properties with the cost of affecting the surface texture.

Some have found that the integration of fiberglass, low-profile additives, and different resin techniques to thermosets can reduce the loss of impact strength and final texture. These advancements could potentially lead to automotive parts being produced through injection molding only.

=== Moulding defects ===
Injection moulding is a complex technology with possible production problems. They can be caused either by defects in the moulds, or more often by the moulding process itself.

Moulding defects	Alternative name	Descriptions	Causes
Blister	Blistering	Raised or layered zone on surface of the part	Tool or material is too hot, often caused by a lack of cooling around the tool or a faulty heater.
Burn marks	Air burn/gas burn/dieseling/gas marks/Blow marks	Black or brown burnt areas on the part located at furthest points from gate or where air is trapped	Tool lacks venting, injection speed is too high.
Colour streaks		Localised change of colour	Masterbatch isn't mixing properly, or the material has run out and it's starting to come through as natural only. Previous coloured material "dragging" in nozzle or check valve.
Contamination	Unwanted or foreign material	Different colour matter seen in product, weakening the product	Poor material introduced by bad recycling or regrind policy; may include floor sweepings, dust and debris.
Delamination		Thin mica like layers formed in part wall	Contamination of the material e.g. PP mixed with ABS, very dangerous if the part is being used for a safety critical application as the material has very little strength when delaminated as the materials cannot bond.
Flash		Excess material in thin layer exceeding normal part geometry	Mould is over packed or parting line on the tool is damaged, too much injection speed/material injected, clamping force too low. Can also be caused by dirt and contaminants around tooling surfaces.
Embedded contaminates	Embedded particulates	Foreign particle (burnt material or other) embedded in the part	Particles on the tool surface, contaminated material or foreign debris in the barrel, or too much shear heat burning the material prior to injection.
Flow marks	Flow lines	Directionally "off tone" wavy lines or patterns	Injection speeds too slow (the plastic has cooled down too much during injection, injection speeds should be set as fast as is appropriate for the process and material used).
Gate Blush	Halo or Blush Marks	Circular pattern around gate, normally only an issue on hot runner molds	Injection speed is too fast, gate/sprue/runner size is too small, or the melt/mold temp is too low.
Jetting		Jetting is a snake-like stream which occurs when polymer melt is pushed at a high velocity through restrictive areas.	Poor tool design, gate position or runner. Injection speed set too high. Poor design of gates, which causes too little die swell and result jetting.
Knit lines	Weld lines	Small lines on the backside of core pins or windows in parts that look like just lines.	Caused by the melt-front flowing around an object standing proud in a plastic part as well as at the end of fill where the melt-front comes together again. Can be minimised or eliminated with a mould-flow study when the mould is in design phase. Once the mould is made and the gate is placed, one can minimise this flaw only by changing the melt and the mould temperature.
Polymer degradation		Polymer breakdown from hydrolysis, oxidation etc.	Excess water in the granules, excessive temperatures in barrel, excessive screw speeds causing high shear heat, material being allowed to sit in the barrel for too long, too much regrind being used.
Sink marks	Sinks	Localised depression (In thicker zones)	Holding time/pressure too low, cooling time too short, with sprueless hot runners this can also be caused by the gate temperature being set too high. Excessive material or walls too thick.
Short shot	Short fill, nonfill, or short mould	Partial part	Lack of material, injection speed or pressure too low, mould too cold, lack of gas vents.
Splay marks	Splash mark or silver streaks	Usually appears as silver streaks along the flow pattern, however depending on the type and colour of material it may represent as small bubbles caused by trapped moisture.	Moisture in the material, usually when hygroscopic resins are dried improperly. Trapping of gas in "rib" areas due to excessive injection velocity in these areas. Material too hot, or is being sheared too much.
Stringiness	Stringing or long-gate	String like remnant from previous shot transfer in new shot	Nozzle temperature too high. Gate hasn't frozen off, no decompression of the screw, no sprue break, poor placement of the heater bands inside the tool.
Voids		Empty space within part (air pocket is commonly used)	Lack of holding pressure (holding pressure is used to pack out the part during the holding time). Filling too fast, not allowing the edges of the part to set up. Also mould may be out of registration (when the two halves don't centre properly and part walls are not the same thickness). The provided information is the common understanding, Correction: The Lack of pack (not holding) pressure (pack pressure is used to pack out even though is the part during the holding time). Filling too fast does not cause this condition, as a void is a sink that did not have a place to happen. In other words, as the part shrinks the resin separated from itself as there was not sufficient resin in the cavity. The void could happen at any area or the part is not limited by the thickness but by the resin flow and thermal conductivity, but it is more likely to happen at thicker areas like ribs or bosses. Additional root causes for voids are un-melt on the melt pool.
Weld line	Knit line / Meld line / Transfer line	Discoloured line where two flow fronts meet	Mould or material temperatures set too low (the material is cold when they meet, so they don't bond). Time for transition between injection and transfer (to packing and holding) is too early.
Warping	Twisting	Distorted part	Cooling is too short, material is too hot, lack of cooling around the tool, incorrect water temperatures (the parts bow inwards towards the hot side of the tool) Uneven shrinking between areas of the part.
Cracks	Crazing	Improper fusion of two fluid flows, a state before weld line.	Threadline gap in-between part due to improper gate location in complex design parts including excess of holes (multipoint gates to be provided), process optimization, proper air venting.

Methods such as industrial CT scanning can help with finding these defects externally as well as internally.

=== Tolerances ===
Tolerance depends on the dimensions of the part. An example of a standard tolerance for a 1-inch dimension of an LDPE part with 0.125 inch wall thickness is +/- 0.008 inch (0.2 mm).

== Power requirements ==
The power required for this process of injection moulding depends on many things and varies between materials used. Manufacturing Processes Reference Guide states that the power requirements depend on "a material's specific gravity, melting point, thermal conductivity, part size, and molding rate." Below is a table from page 243 of the same reference as previously mentioned that best illustrates the characteristics relevant to the power required for the most commonly used materials.

Material	Specific gravity	Melting point (°F)	Melting point (°C)
Epoxy	1.12 to 1.24	248	120
Phenolic	1.34 to 1.95	248	120
Nylon	1.01 to 1.15	381 to 509	194 to 265
Polyethylene	0.91 to 0.965	230 to 243	110 to 117
Polystyrene	1.04 to 1.07	338	170

== Robotic moulding ==
Automation means that the smaller size of parts permits a mobile inspection system to examine multiple parts more quickly. In addition to mounting inspection systems on automatic devices, multiple-axis robots can remove parts from the mould and position them for further processes.

Specific instances include removing of parts from the mould immediately after the parts are created, as well as applying machine vision systems. A robot grips the part after the ejector pins have been extended to free the part from the mould. It then moves them into either a holding location or directly onto an inspection system. The choice depends upon the type of product, as well as the general layout of the manufacturing equipment. Vision systems mounted on robots have greatly enhanced quality control for insert moulded parts. A mobile robot can more precisely determine the placement accuracy of the metal component, and inspect faster than a human can.

== Gallery ==
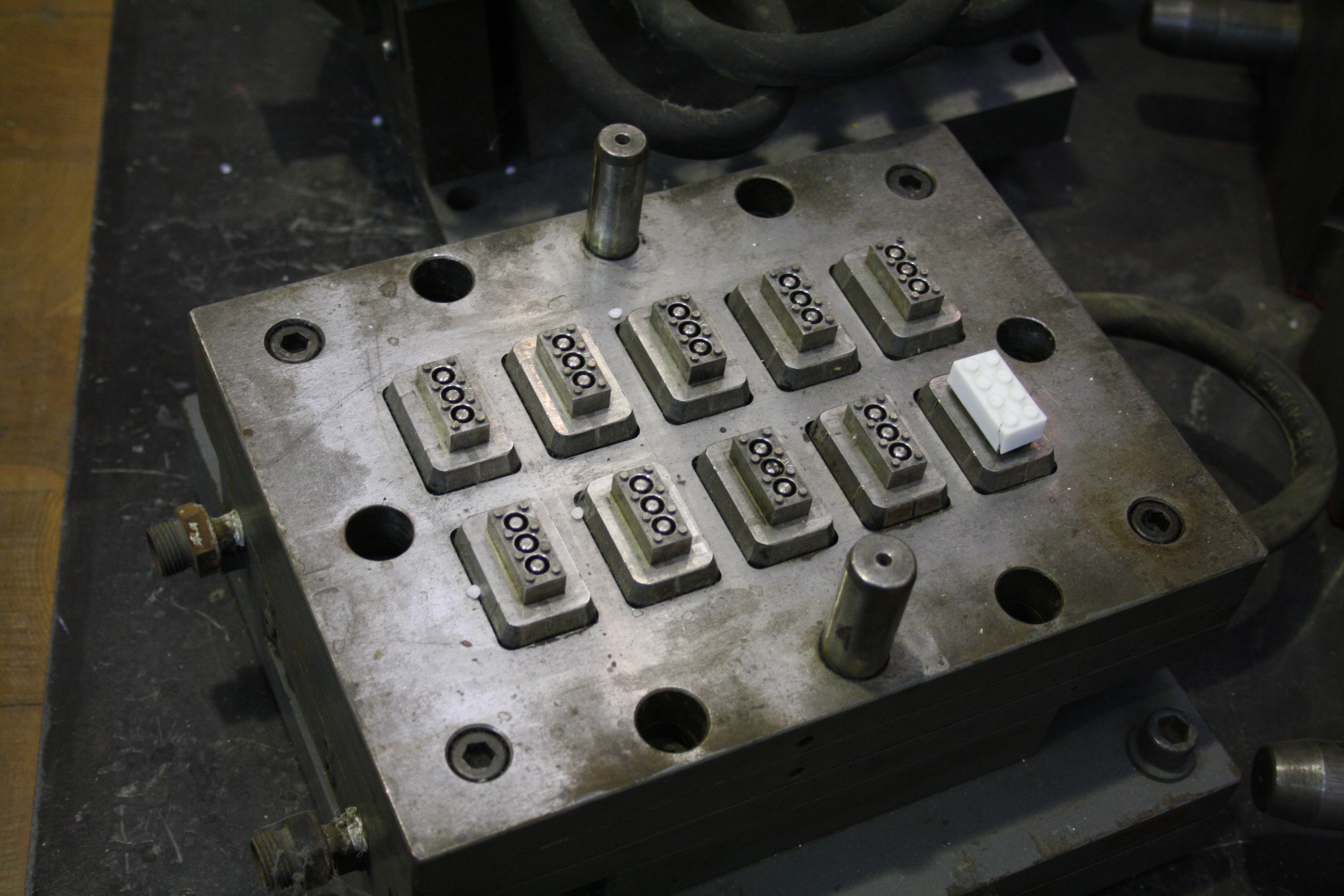
Lego injection mould, lower side

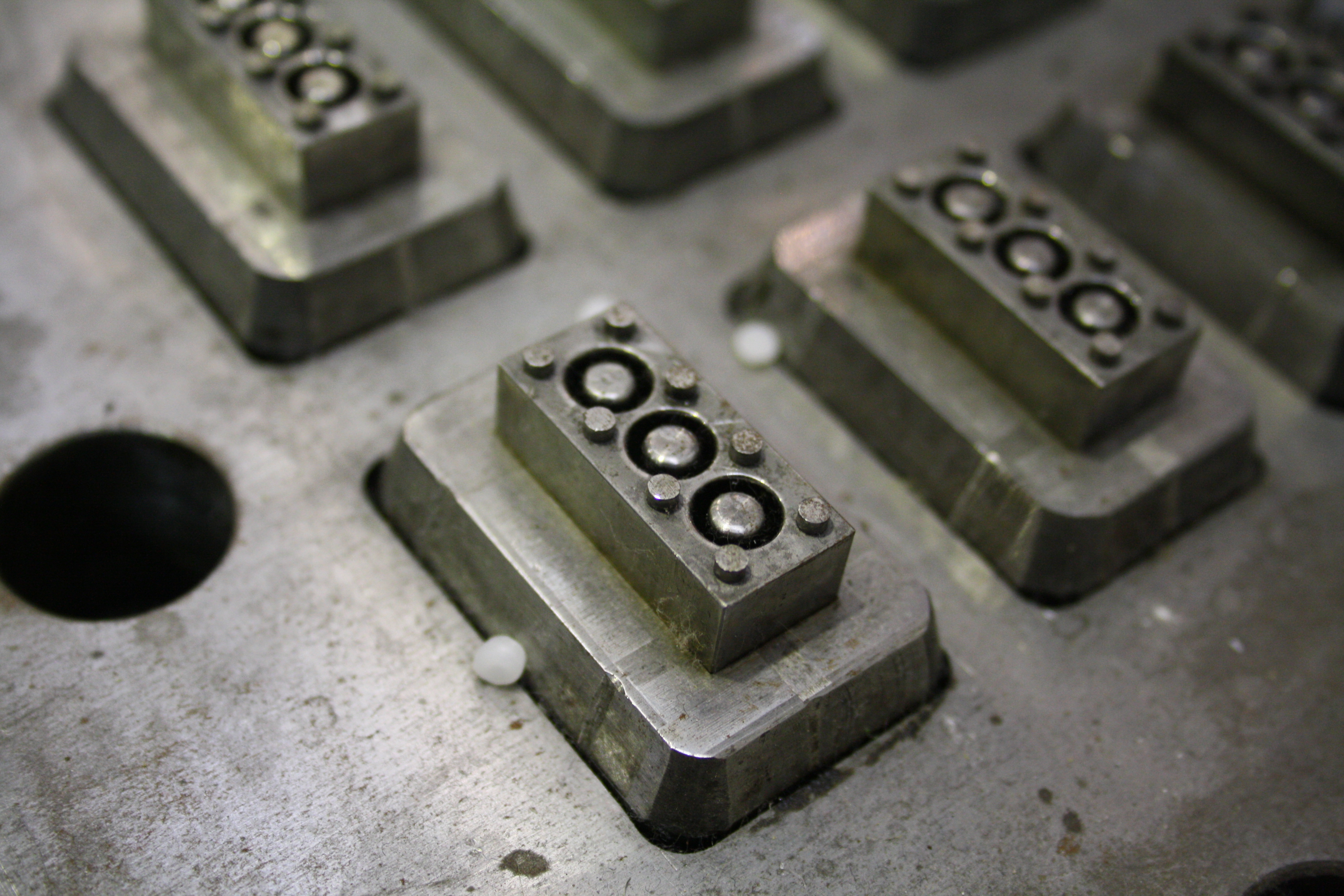
Lego injection mould, detail of lower side

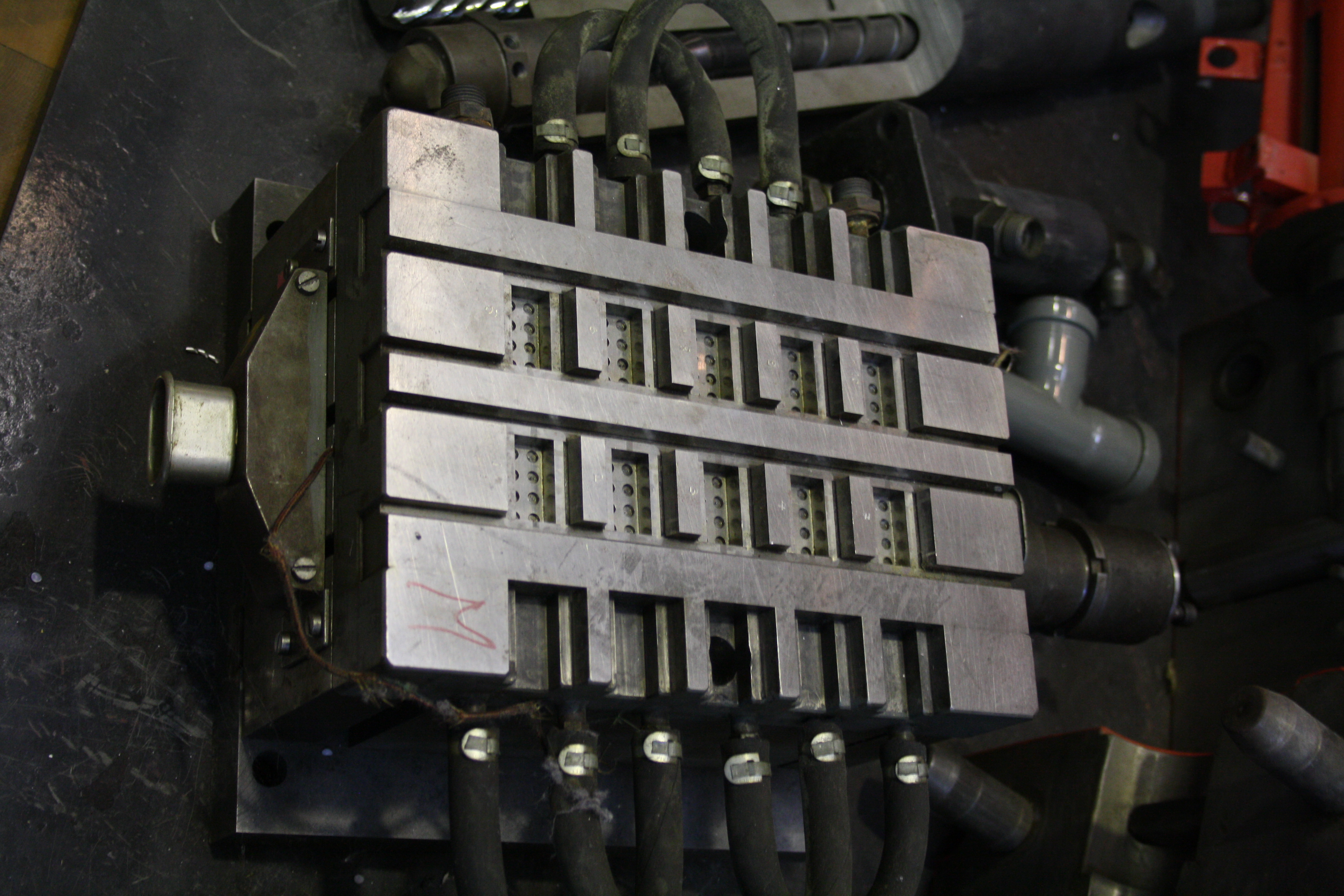
Lego injection mould, upper side

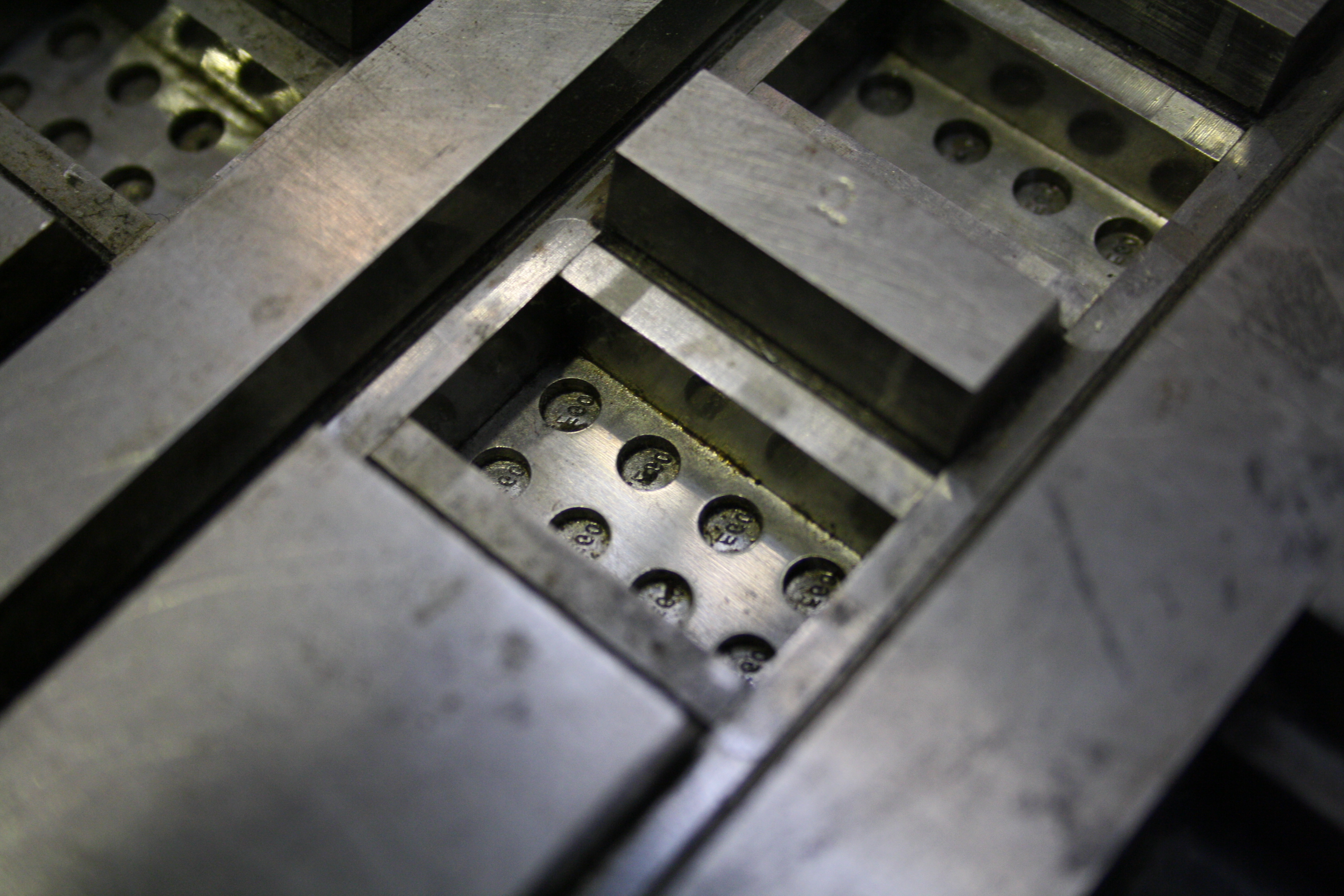
Lego injection mould, detail of upper side

== Plastic injection molding simulation software ==
Plastic injection molding simulation software enables engineers to digitally predict how molten plastic will fill the mold cavity, helping to prevent costly manufacturing defects before physical mold cutting. These tools analyze the entire process fill, pack, cool, and deform (FPCW) cycle to optimize gate placement, runway systems, and cooling channels.

Molding simulation helps designers and engineers understand risks early in the design process, allowing them to address these risks before full implementation. Simulation software provides engineers, mold makers, and other product design and manufacturing professionals with accurate digital prototyping solutions, helping to bring better products to market faster.

Injection molding simulation can be used in conjunction with other simulation tools, including mechanical stress, vibration, motion, computational fluid dynamics (CFD), and multiphysics.

=== Advantages of Plastic Injection Molding Software ===
- Predict surface treatment defects
- Predict and prevent deformation
- Optimize design for lightweighting
- Reduce cycle time

== Health and Safety ==
Manufacturing molded plastics involves the release of volatile organic compounds, styrene, and formaldehyde, which pose a threat to workers' health. Employees exposed to persistent fumes from common molding resins such as acrylonitrile butadiene styrene (ABS) or polystyrene may be at risk of developing cancer. Burns are one of the leading injuries in the plastics manufacturing industry. High-temperature surfaces, nozzles, and molds all pose risks. Mold-making machines can also cause crushing and pinching injuries, and the risk of slipping, tripping, and falling is very high during daily operations. Prolonged work can lead to fatal occupational asthma.

== See also ==
- Craft
- Design of plastic components
- Direct injection expanded foam molding
- Extrusion moulding
- Fusible core injection moulding
- Gravimetric blender
- Hobby injection moulding
- Injection mould construction
- Matrix moulding
- Multi-material injection moulding
- Rapid Heat Cycle Molding
- Reaction injection moulding
- Rotational moulding
- Urethane casting
- Hot runner
