= Hobby injection molding =

Small scale, individual use of injection molding technology

Hobby injection molding machines, also known as benchtop injectors, hold injection molds on a smaller scale. Benchtop injectors have become more common as inexpensive CNC milling machines have reduced the cost of producing molds in a home workshop.

In hobby injectors, injection pressure is generated manually by the operator, with a lever or gear translating the operator's effort to the required pressure. The most common hobby injection machine uses a handle to press down with. This enables the user to generate roughly 250 pounds-force (1.1 kN) of downward force, through the use of leverage.

== History ==
It is not known when the first hobby injection molder was constructed. Before the development of inexpensive CNC milling machines, producing a metal mold was prohibitively expensive for most hobbyists. With a small CNC mill and personal CAD tools, though, even complex shapes can be cut easily and accurately.

== Applications ==
Hobby injection molding has a variety of applications including the creation of low cost prototypes, new inventions, replication of lost or broken parts, and provides homeowners the opportunity to build anything. Hobby injection molding is a low cost method of repeatable production.

== Materials ==
Polyethylene (both LDPE and HDPE), polypropylene, and polystyrene (including HIPS) have all been used successfully with lever-actuated benchtop injectors.

== Equipment ==
Benchtop injectors are smaller and simpler than their larger industrious counterparts because they rely on the operator to manually inject melted polymer into the mold and remove the finished part from the mold. Production injectors automatically inject melted polymer at a prescribed rate into the mold, cool the mold to rapidly solidify the polymer, then eject the part from the mold once it cools. The two halves of the mold must be pressed together with great force to prevent a flash in the part where the two halves meet, and the nozzle of the injector must be pressed tightly against the inlet port of the mold to prevent the escape of melted polymer and a defect in the finished part. In a benchtop injector, this is done manually by clamping or bolting the mold together and clamping the complete mold into the injector. In a production injector this is accomplished with hydraulic or pneumatic actuators, which increase the cost of the machine but dramatically reduce the labor required to produce a finished part.

== Molds ==
=== Metal molds ===
Low cost benchtop CNC milling machines allow home enthusiasts to machine molds out of softer metals. Rather than P20 tool steel, most grades of aluminum can be machined into working molds capable of 1000 plus cycles. Mic 6 cast aluminum is more stable post machining and during cycles than hot extruded grades like 6061 and is easy to machine however it has worse mechanical properties. 7000 series like 7050 and 7075 are preferred for the best mechanical properties in aluminum, they are comparable to low to mid carbon steel molds. Copper alloys, like pewter, or bismuth alloy molds can be cast around a model to create strong molds with higher molding temperatures than epoxy molds. The casting around a model to create each mold part produces complex molds quickly. The parts can also capture detailed surface finishes.

=== Epoxy molds ===
Epoxy molds typically mix epoxy with a metal powder (generally aluminum) to form a mold. Atomized aluminum allows for the distribution of heat from the mold surface outward toward the edges. This typically preserves the surface quality for 50-100 cycles on a single epoxy mold.

Due to the nature of oxygen entrapment in epoxy during the pouring and curing period, it is common to have distortions and cavitation in the final injection mold. Pressurizing the epoxy during the curing period is a form of surface quality retention. External pressures can be created with the use of a pressure pot connected to an air compressor to crush air trapped inside the epoxy mold during curing. As time passes over a 24-hour period the oxygen bubbles will not be able to escape and will cure directly inside the mold. With sufficient pressure, these small cavities will be invisible to the naked eye.

Degassing the epoxy during the curing period can also be done using a vacuum chamber and will require a pressure of 100 kPa (29 inHg) in order to create near vacuum conditions. This can be achieved with the use of a 2-stage vacuum pump that is capable of 2 Pa (15 μmHg).

=== Single-use molds ===
Single-use injection molds can be achieved through the use of plaster of Paris. The mold breaks down after the first shot and will rarely allow for the injection of a second shot.

== See also ==
- Injection molding
- Computer numerical control (CNC)
