= 3D metal moulding =

3D metal moulding, also referred to as metal injection moulding or (MIM), is used to manufacture components with complex geometries. The process uses a mixture of metal powders and polymer binders – also known as "feedstock" – which are then injection moulded.

After moulding, the parts are thermally processed in order to remove the binding agent. They are then sintered to a high-density metal component which has mechanical properties comparable to wrought materials.

3D metal moulding is mainly used to achieve intricate and complex shapes that are very difficult or expensive to produce using conventional manufacturing methods.

== Applications ==
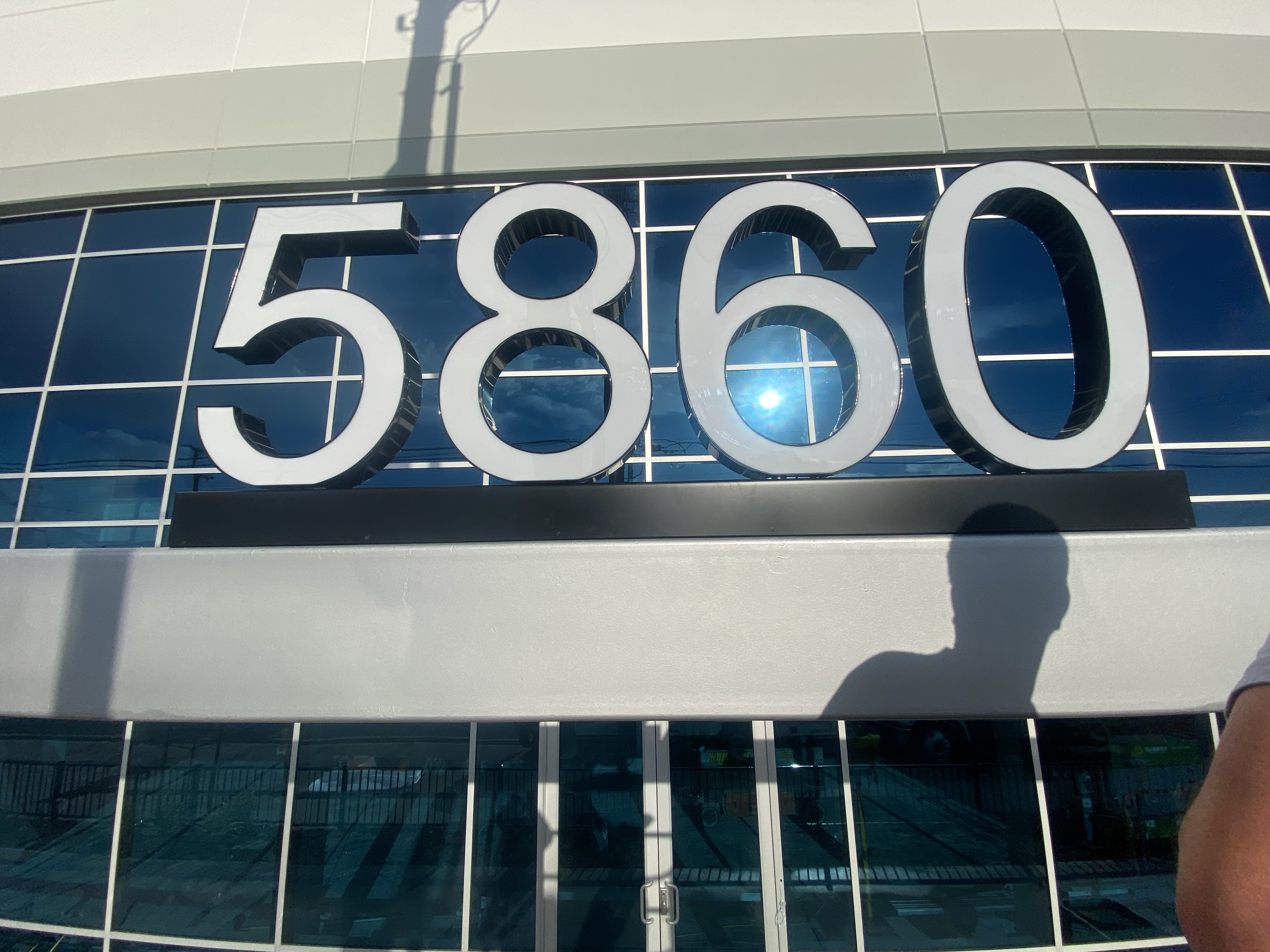
Large 3D letters displaying address number anchored on building facade

3D metal molding is used in aerospace, medical and other industries. Its popularity is due to its strength in the form of a custom shape or part. More commonly found as a 3D mold are thermoplastic and thermosetting polymers. Both of these processes are used in the following industries:

- Environmental
- Marine
- Oil and gas
- Housing
- Construction
- Food equipment/handling
- Appliance
- Automotive
- Waste water treatment
- HVAC
- Medical
- Consumer
- Commercial
- Recreational
- Aerospace
- Telecommunications
- Dental

== Benefits ==
- Reducing costs by using the exact volume of material required to create the part.
- Once the tooling is created huge volumes of high quality parts can be produced with little lead time.
- MIM can achieve intricate parts with complex geometries reducing the requirement for secondary operations, such as brand engravings.
- Parts can be moulded from a wide range of materials including 'exotic' metals.
- 3D Metal Moulding is best suited for volumes of 1000 plus parts – though can also be cost effective for smaller quantities, depending on the material and design.

== 3D metal printing ==
3D metal printing builds components by delivering the powdered metal and binder in alternative layers through a nozzle controlled by a computer system, working to a CAD drawing. The initial process does not achieve the required strength so parts must go through a secondary process which involves fusing another type of metal into the shape.

There are multiple methods used in 3D metal printing. Selective laser sintering, or SLS, uses heat from a powerful laser to fuse tiny ceramic, glass or plastic particles together, forming a 3D part. Carl Deckard and Joe Beaman of the University of Texas developed and patented the process in the 1980s.

Direct metal laser sintering, or DMLS, uses a laser to sinter powdered metal into a solid object in gradual layers built upon each other. Cooling channels can be printed to any shape in this process, which lessens time and waste and improves quality.

Selective laser melting, or SLM, completely melts the powder to form a homogeneous part. This process can only be used for single materials, so is not suitable for alloys.
