= Weld line =

In manufacturing, the weld line or knit line or meld line is the line where two flow fronts meet when there is the inability of two or more flow fronts to "knit" together, or "weld", during the molding process. These lines usually occur around holes or obstructions and cause locally weak areas in the molded part. Knit lines are considered molding defects, and occur when the mold or/and material temperatures are set too low: thus the materials will be cold when they meet, so that they do not bond perfectly. This can cause a weak area in the part which can cause breakage when the part is under stress. Weld lines therefore occur during machine start-up, when equilibrium conditions have not been met. Mouldings made in this setting-up period must be rejected.

There are many computer-aided engineering tools that are available that can predict where these areas could occur, but a skilled designer will be able to predict where such defects can be found by examining the tool or product.

Weld lines are not found in other manufacturing methods such as rotational moulding, but can exist in extrusion, especially where there are internal metal supports for a die. The defects are then known as spider lines.

== Causes ==
Weld lines can be caused by several different problems:

- Low temperature of injection moulding machine barrel
- Inadequate back pressure
- Injection pressure or injection speed is too low
- Low mold temperature
- Small injection gates and/or runners
- Improper location of injection gate
- Too many gates
- Excessive gate land length
- Improper flow rate of injected materials
- Inconsistent process cycle
- poor product design
