= Rapid Heat Cycle Molding =

Rapid Heat Cycle Molding (RHCM) is also known as steam injection molding. Dr. Chao-Tsai Huang has written an extensive 68 page paper outlining, among other things, a case study on RHCM. His paper is entitled In-depth Study of RHCM and IHM Technologiesand Industrial Applications.

In general, ABS material is used as the raw material. The primary advantage of steam injection is that it eliminates weld-lines on molded parts. This allows companies to eliminate future processes such as painting. In non-steam molding, water will heat the tool to a constant temperature. Plastic will be injected to the warm tool.

In steam molding, steam is injected at 160 degrees to heat the tool. When the tool reaches a predetermined temperature (about 140 degrees), the plastic is injected. Cold water is immediately added to the process to cool the plastic down to around 40 degrees. Because the mold is so hot when the plastic is injected, there are no weld lines, and a "perfect" product results. Steam injection molding is now being extensively used to produce the front covers of LCD TVs.
