= Flow mark =

Injection molding manufacturing defect

Flow marks, also known as flow lines, are molding defects that can occur in the manufacturing process of injection molding. They are best described as "off tone" wavy lines/streaks or patterns in the molded part around the injection ports. They commonly occur when there is a large variation between cooling speeds of sections of the material as it flows through the mold.

== Prevention Methods ==
Flow mark causes vary for specific parts and production lines due to the variability in molds, machines, and materials. For the most part they are due to varying cooling speeds of the material as it flows through the mold. The different prevention methods for varying cooling speeds are as follows:

=== Injection Speed/Pressure ===
Insufficient Injection speed and pressure can cause the injected material to cool and become stiffer during the injection process which can lead to a dull finish on the surface of the part. Increasing the speed will allow the material shot to fill the mold before it cools.

=== Material/Mold Temperature ===
A low temperature will have a similar effect as a slow injection speed due to both causing the material to stiffen before the cycle completes. Increasing the temperature of the material or mold allows the material to flow without stiffening before the cycle completes.

If the temperature is increased too high, there is a chance to cause a different type of injection molding defect referred to as a burn mark.

=== Mold Design ===
The design of a mold is one of the most important factors in correcting defects due to it controlling most of the process. For flow marks specifically, some causes that can be addressed are varying wall thicknesses, mold gate locations, and rough flow paths. Prevention for varying wall thicknesses is to round the corner where the thickness varies. This prevents the flow rate from suddenly decreasing or changing direction. Moving the location of mold gates away from mold coolant allows the material to flow more evenly and prevent premature cooling. Flow paths in the mold should allow the material to flow smoothly through the mold to prevent drastic variation in flow rate.
