= RJG Inc. =

RJG Incorporated
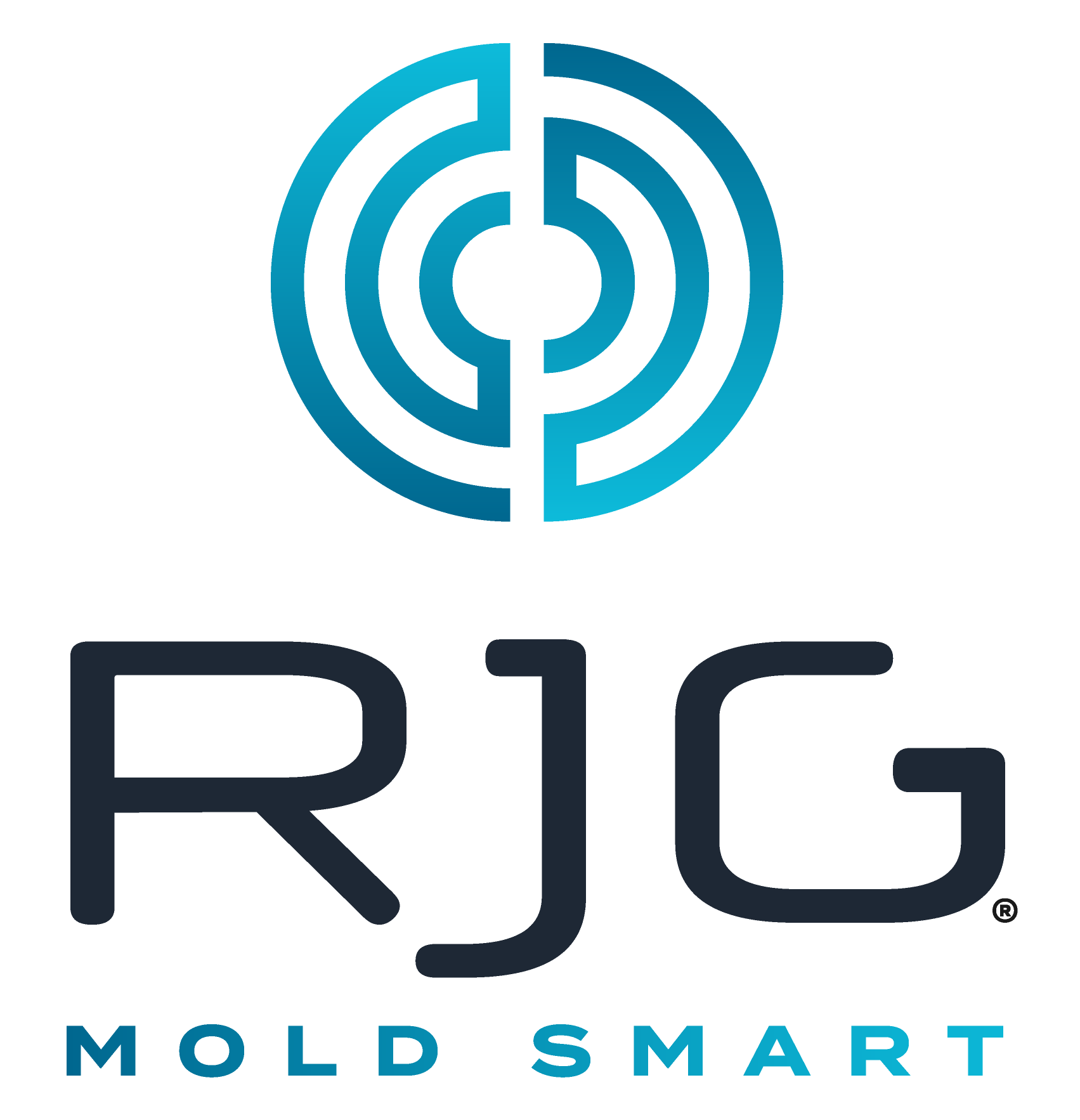
- Company type: Privately held
- Industry: Injection Molding
- Founded: Traverse City, Michigan (1985)
- Founder: Rod Groleau
- Headquarters: Traverse City, United States of America
- Key people: Rod Groleau, Director; Dale Westerman, President & CEO
- Products: CoPilot, eDart, Sensors, Training, & Consulting
- Website: rjginc.com

RJG Inc. is a training, technology, and consulting company that specializes in the injection molding industry. They offer training courses around the globe, including Master Molder I and II, Systematic Molding, Injection Molding Essentials, and more. They also offer CoPilot, a process control system that allows for data extraction of plastic conditions inside the mold using pressure sensors, transducers and strain gauges. The company is responsible for pioneering DECOUPLED MOLDING® techniques which have since become industry standard.

== History ==
In 1985, Rod Groleau started a training and consulting company (then named RJG Associates, Inc.), where he developed techniques for retrieving data for plastic conditions inside the mold, previous to this only data from the molding machine itself was used for processing techniques. By 1999, the company developed controls allowing for different "stages" of molding and the "DART" (Data Acquisition and Retrieval with Transducers) system, which allowed for data to be retrieved by personal computers. In 1998, the company began offering Master molder certifications, a training program of robust scientific techniques which is highly valuable to employers in the industry. Since then, the company has continued to develop further innovations that have a major impact on the industry.

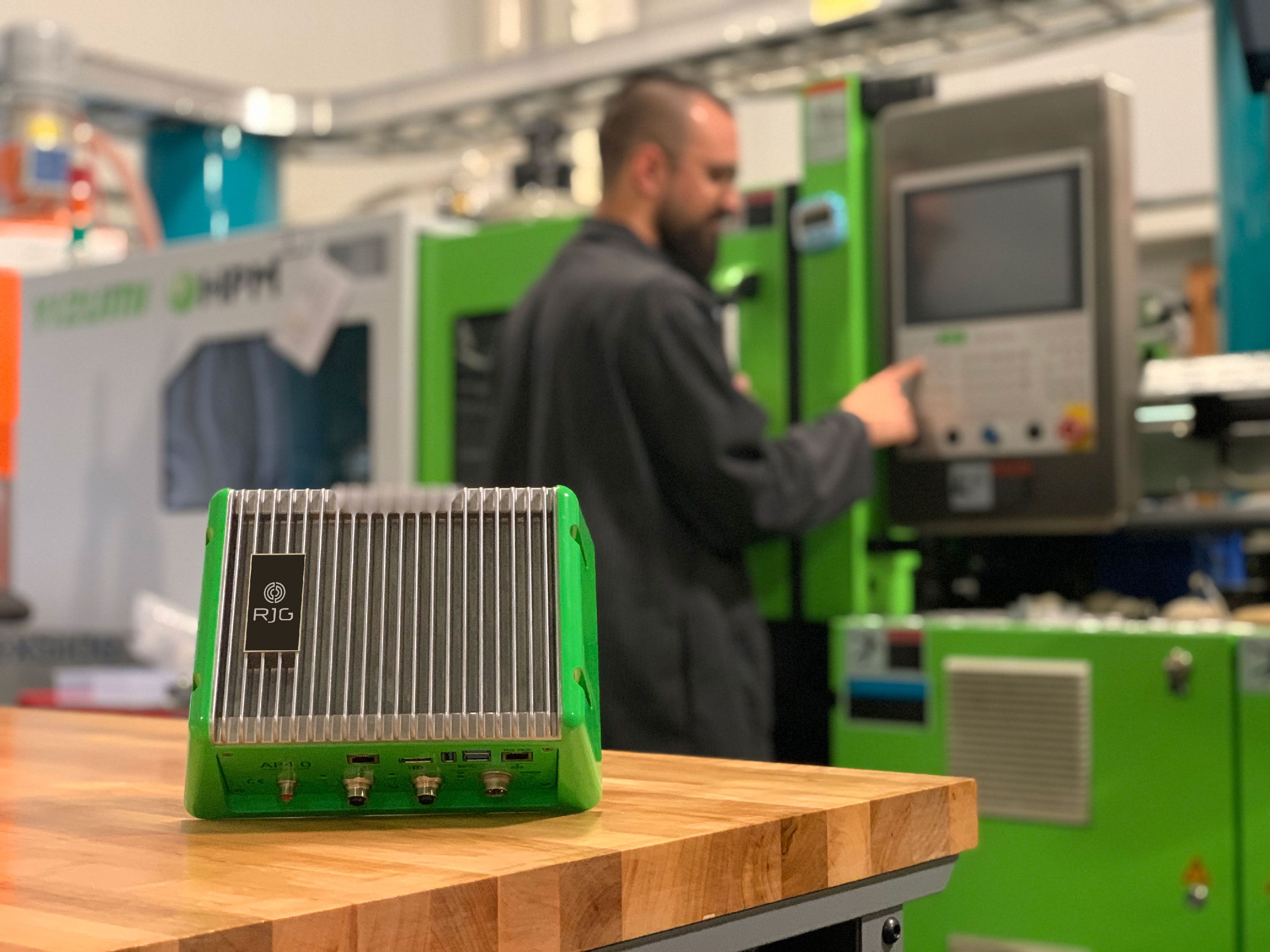
RJG's CoPilot® System is the injection molding industry's latest process control technology.

== Awards ==
1996 - Michigan Top 100 Fastest Growing Companies

1997 - Michigan Top 100 Fastest Growing Companies

1998 - Michigan Top 100 Fastest Growing Companies

1999 - Michigan Top 100 Fastest Growing Companies (award discontinued after 1999)
