= Multi-material injection molding =

Process of molding two or more different materials into one plastic part at one time

Multi-material injection molding (MMM) is the process of molding two or more different materials into one plastic part at one time. As is the case in traditional injection molding, multi material injection molding uses materials that are at or near their melting point so that the semi-liquidous (viscous) material can fill voids and cavities within a pre-machined mold, thus taking on the desired shape of designed tooling. In general, advantages of MMM over other production techniques include, but are not limited to, creating parts that have an elastic modulus that varies with location on the part (different regional polymer hardness), creating a single-structure part with different regional materials (similar to the previous advantage, but more focused on joining different types of polymers like rubber and plastic), and also creating a single part with multiple independent polymer colors. Applications range from simple household items like a toothbrush to more heavy duty construction of items like power tools.

The three most widely used methods of MMM fabrication are:

- multi-component
- multi-shot
- over-molding

Each MMM primary subset can also be further subdivided into secondary and tertiary subsets, and even further in some cases. This can be advantageous when fine tuning or other general calibration of a specific MMM process is desired. Each primary subset is outlined further in the following sections.

== Multi-component injection molding ==
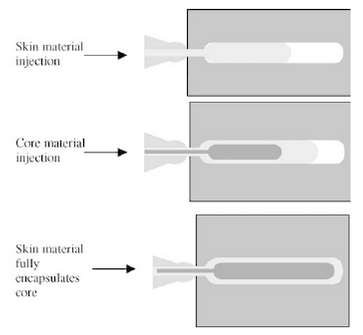
Co- Injection Molding Process

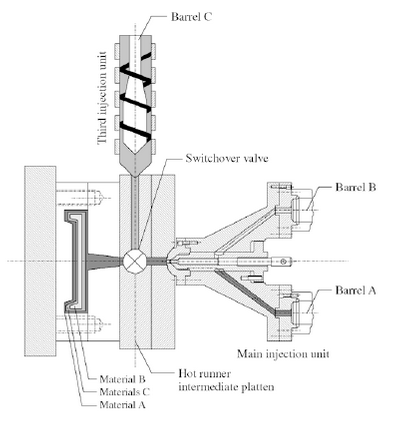
Battenfield three-channel MMM technique used for MMM of three materials at one time

Also referred to as co-injection molding, multi-component injection molding describes insertion of multiple viscous materials injected simultaneously, as opposed to placing one material as an additional layer relative to another. In other words, it creates a sandwich-like structure where both materials mold around each other as dissimilar liquids, and exist in such a state at the same time. Relative to the part center, materials can be injected concentrically using the same mold/gate, or regionally using gates at different locations.

== Multi-shot injection molding (MSM) ==
Also referred to as sequential injection molding, multi-shot injection molding refers to creation of multiple layers relative to the starting axis of the initial mold. In other words, the warm, heated materials are inserted into the mold in a very specific sequence one after another. This creates a layering effect between materials while maintaining relatively high-energy interactions at material boundaries. This is important because it implies that the inter-layer bonds are stronger in many cases than when the layers are applied to a previously cooled part, as is more closely the case of over molding. While there are other applications, this operation is preferred when varying molds (different geometries) are desired between material layers.

== Over-molding ==
Over molding is effectively the use of layering effects in polymer application techniques. This process is centered around the use of a liquidous resin to add additional layers of shape and structure to an existing component. An example of such a resin could be a polymer that has been heated to a temperature just above its glass transition temperature. The existing component to which the resin is being added is often injection molded as well, and may be near its own glass transition temperature. This process works well when layers with varying geometric profiles are desired around a central "core" structure.

== Benefits ==
If the desired object is manufacturable using MMM, it is definitely best to use MMM over traditional injection molding. Some of the key features that makes MMM a better approach are:

- lower cost
- higher-quality product
- significant reduction in assembly operations
- reduction in cycle times
