= Direct injection expanded foam molding =

Foam manufacturing process

Direct injection expanded foam molding (also known as injection molded foam) is a manufacturing process that creates soft foam products direct from a compound into a final product. This process eliminates the steps normally required for die-cutting and compression molding, because it manufactures the foam and the product, simultaneously.

The base resin, used in a complex formula, is an ethylene-based polyolefin elastomer (like polyethylene and EVA). Foam that is manufactured with these resins has many physical benefits. Unlike a sponge, foams from this process are closed-cell, meaning it's waterproof and resists mold, mildew, and bacteria from entering the material.

It is also cross-linked, which means that the cells are connected in a way that makes the foam strong and durable with high tear and tensile strength.

All polyolefin elastomers are also resistant to most chemicals, which allows the products to not only be used in a chemical environment but also with most household cleaners.

The process itself is known to be very interesting because the injected compound is not foam, until an endothermic reaction in a hot mold activates the blowing agents, resulting in an expanded foam part. This requires the mold cavity size to be smaller than the final part. The actual known expansion is created within the formula, so that when the part "self-ejects" from the mold at the end of the cycle, it grows to the required part size.

The cavity for a tire is considerably smaller than the final tire size. This process is valuable for any foam product that needs to have lots of detail. It needs to be very durable.
