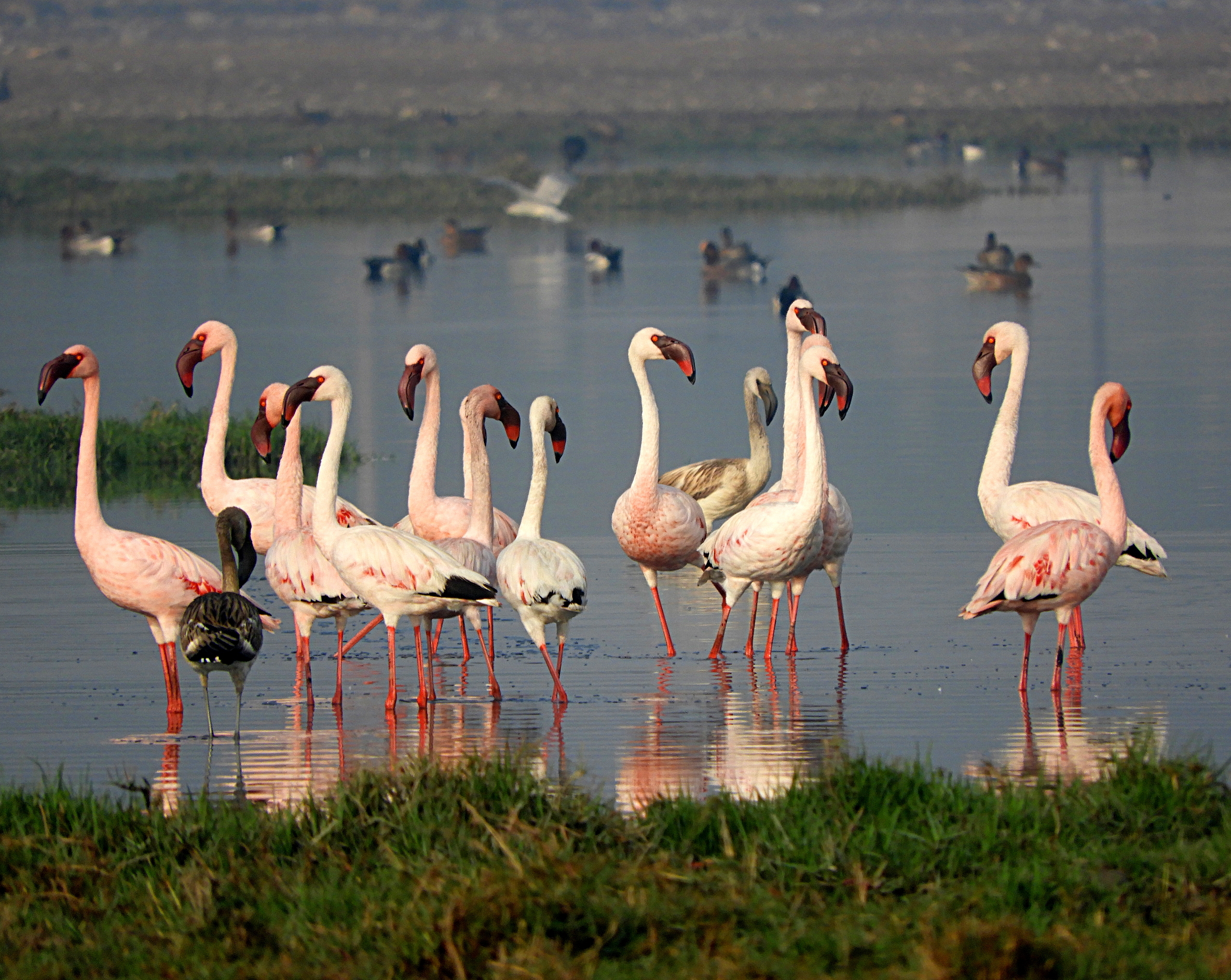
- Adults and two juveniles at Jamnagar, India

Conservation status
- Near Threatened (IUCN 3.1)
- CITES Appendix II

Scientific classification
- Kingdom: Animalia
- Phylum: Chordata
- Class: Aves
- Order: Phoenicopteriformes
- Family: Phoenicopteridae
- Genus: Phoeniconaias
- Species: P. minor

Binomial name
- Phoeniconaias minor (Geoffroy Saint-Hilaire, É, 1798)
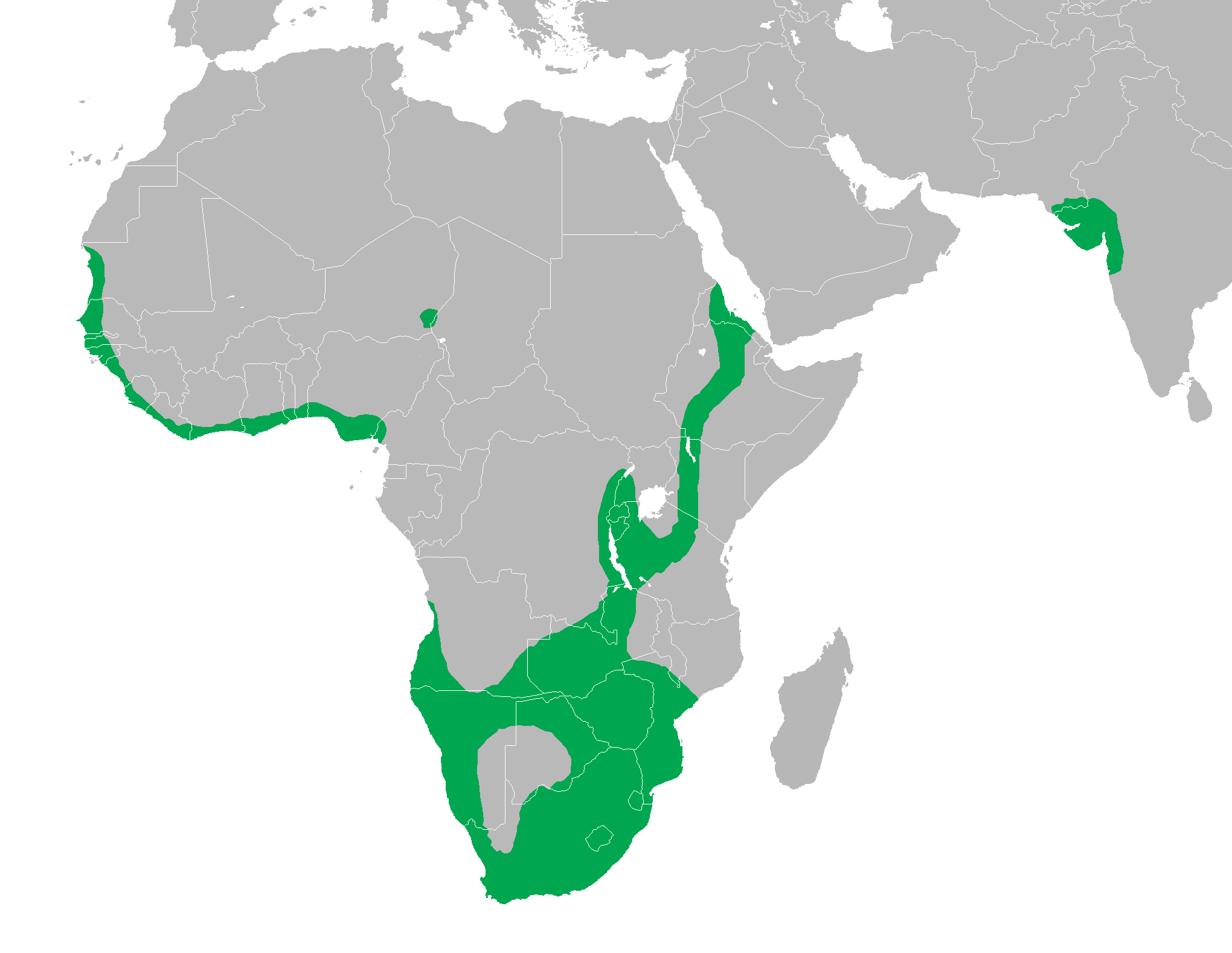
- native range

Synonyms
- Phoenicopterus minor Geoffroy Saint-Hilaire, 1798; Phoeniconaias minor George Robert Gray, 1869

= Lesser flamingo =

Species of bird

The lesser flamingo (Phoeniconaias minor) is a species of flamingo occurring in sub-Saharan Africa and western India. Birds are occasionally reported from farther north, but these are generally considered vagrants.

== Description ==
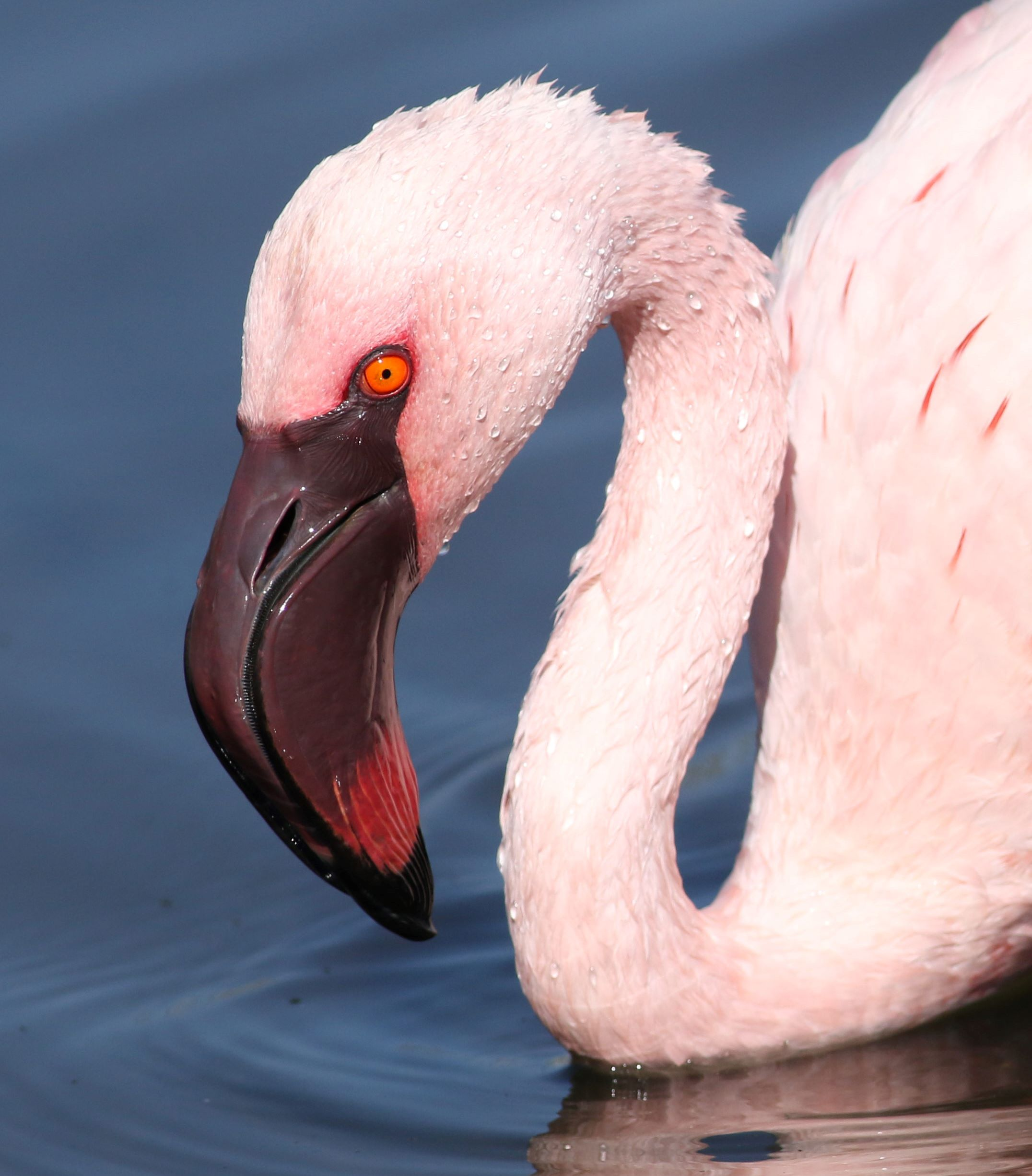
A close-up of the head at Marievale, South Africa

The lesser flamingo is the smallest species of flamingo, though it is a tall and large bird by most standards. The species can weigh from 1.2 to 2.7 kg (2.6 to 6.0 lb). The standing height is around 80 to 90 cm (31 to 35 in). The total length (from beak to tail) and wingspan are in the same range of measurements, from 90 to 105 cm (35 to 41 in).

Most of the plumage is pinkish white. The clearest difference between this species and the greater flamingo, the only other Old World species of flamingo, is the much more extensive black on the bill. Size is less helpful to distinguish the two species, unless they occur together, since the sexes of each species also differ in height.

The extinct species Phoeniconaias proeses in the same genus, from the Pliocene of Australia, is thought to have been even smaller.

== Ecology ==
The lesser flamingo may be the most common species of flamingo, with a population that (at its peak) probably numbered up to two million individual birds. This species feeds primarily on Spirulina, algae which grow only in very alkaline lakes. Presence of flamingo groups near water bodies is an indication of sodic alkaline water which is not suitable for irrigation use. Although blue-green in colour, the algae contain the photosynthetic pigments that give the birds their pink colour. Their deep bill is specially adapted for filtering tiny food items. Other forms of algae taken are Synechocystis minuscula, Synechococcus pevalekii, Synechococcus elongatus, Monoraphidium minutum, Oscillatoria sp. and Lyngbya sp. This species will also feed, to a lesser extent, on small invertebrates: copepods (Paradiaptomus africanus), diatoms (Navicula) and rotifers (Brachionus), as well as microscopic alkaliphilic cyanobacteria (Arthrospira fusiformis, A. maxima).

=== Predators ===
Lesser flamingos are prey to a variety of species, including marabou storks, vultures, baboons, African fish eagles, jackals, hyenas, foxes, great white pelicans, martial eagles, and big cats.

=== Breeding ===
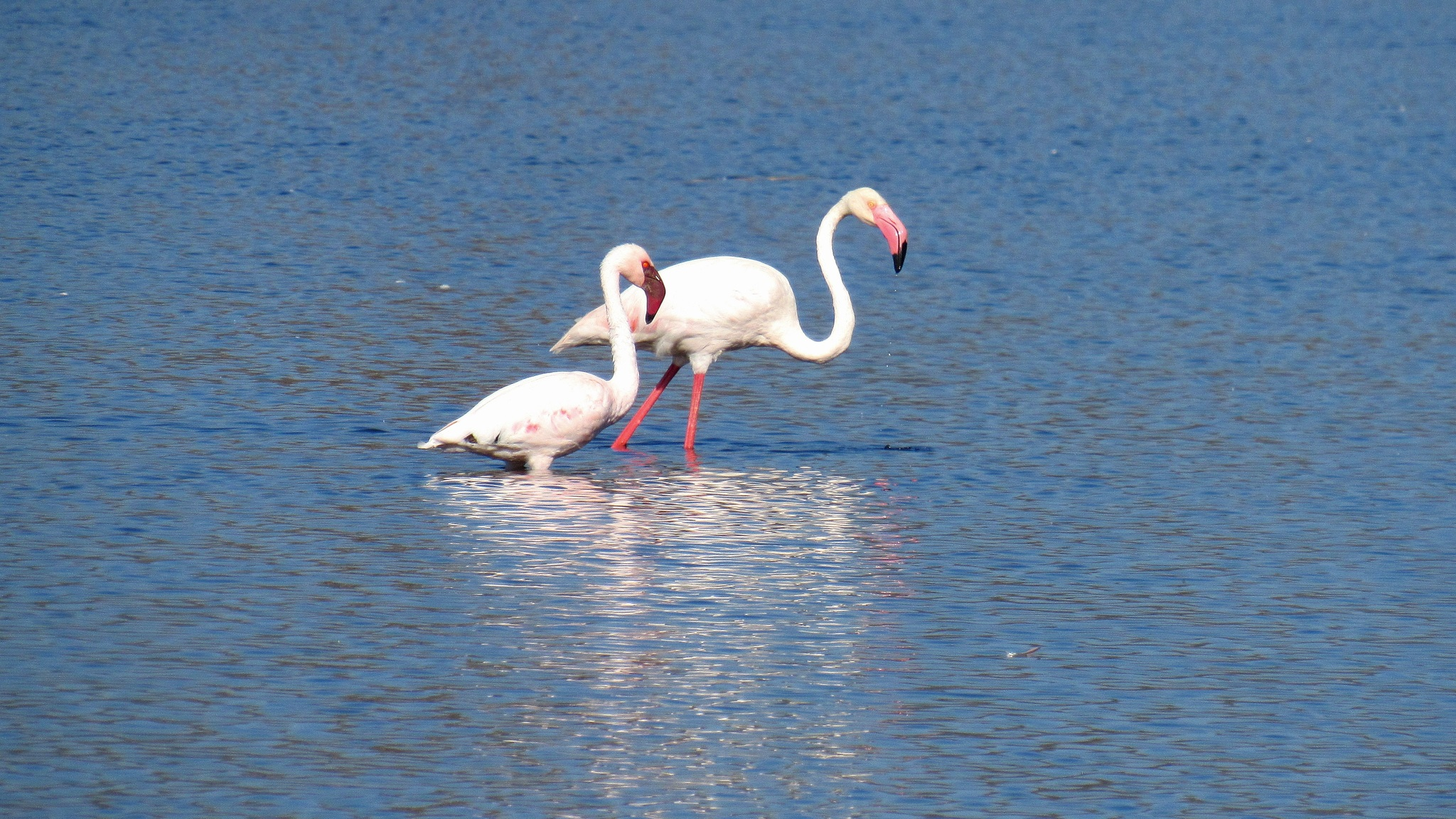
Comparison between greater and lesser flamingos, in Nakuru, Kenya

In Africa, where they are most common, the lesser flamingos breed principally on the highly caustic Lake Natron in northern Ngorongoro District in Arusha Region of Tanzania. Their other African breeding sites are at Etosha Pan, Makgadikgadi Pan, and Kamfers Dam. The last confirmed breeding season at Aftout es Saheli in coastal Mauritania was in 1965. Breeding occurred at Lake Magadi in Kenya in 1962 when Lake Natron was unsuitable due to flooding. In the early 20th century, breeding was also observed at Lake Nakuru.

The species also breeds in southwestern and southern Asia. In 1974, they bred at the Rann of Kutch, but since then, only at the Zinzuwadia and Purabcheria salt pans in northwestern India. Some movement of individuals occurs between Africa and India.

Like all flamingos, they lay a single chalky-white egg on a mound they build of mud. Chicks join creches soon after hatching, sometimes numbering over 100,000 individuals. The creches are marshalled by a few adult birds that lead them by foot to fresh water, a journey that can reach over 32 km (20 mi).

== Threats ==
Despite being the most common species of flamingo, it is classified as near threatened due to its declining population and the low number of breeding sites, some of which are threatened by human activities.

The population in the two key East African lakes, Lake Nakuru and Lake Bogoria, have been adversely affected in recent years by suspected heavy metal poisoning, while its primary African breeding area in Lake Natron is currently under threat by a proposed soda ash plant by Tata Chemicals. The only breeding site in South Africa, situated at Kamfers Dam, is threatened by pollution and encroaching development. East African soda lake productivity declines due to rising water levels are another threat to the lesser flamingo.
