= Spirulina major =

Scientific classification
- Domain: Bacteria
- Phylum: Cyanobacteria
- Class: Cyanophyceae
- Order: Spirulinales
- Family: Spirulinaceae
- Genus: Spirulina
- Species: S. major

Binomial name
- Spirulina major Kützing ex Gomont, 1892

Species of bacterium

Spirulina major is a species of cyanobacteria in the family Spirulinaceae. It's found primarily in the Gulf of Mexico and sparsely on the shores of South America, Africa, Europe, the Middle East, and India.

== Uses ==
Like other species of spirulina, Spirulina Major can be used as a highly nutritional food. Native cultures in Mexico and Africa in particular have used spirulina as a source of protein, especially for athletes.
