= Trichodesmium thiebautii =

Scientific classification
- Domain: Bacteria
- Kingdom: Bacillati
- Phylum: Cyanobacteriota
- Class: Cyanophyceae
- Order: Oscillatoriales
- Family: Microcoleaceae
- Genus: Trichodesmium
- Species: T. thiebautii

Binomial name
- Trichodesmium thiebautii M.A. Gomont, 1892

Species of bacterium

Trichodesmium thiebautii is a cyanobacteria that is often found in open oceans of tropical and subtropical regions and is known to be a contributor to large oceanic surface blooms. This microbial species is a diazotroph, meaning it fixes nitrogen gas (N_{2}), but it does so without the use of heterocysts. T. thiebautii is able to simultaneously perform oxygenic photosynthesis. T. thiebautii was discovered in 1892 by M.A. Gomont. T. thiebautii are important for nutrient cycling in marine habitats because of their ability to fix N_{2}, a limiting nutrient in ocean ecosystems.

== Discovery ==
In 1830 the cyanobacteria genus Trichodesmium was first found in samples collected in marine waters surrounding Egypt and Syria, and described based on morphological features. In 1892, approximately sixty years following the initial discovery of the genus, Gomont described two new species, T. thiebautii and T. hildebrandtii, based on specific morphological characteristics, particularly trichome shape. T. thiebautii was first cultured in a lab in 1993, from water samples collected in North Carolina coastal waters, using a sterilized oligotrophic seawater solution with an addition of 25 mg liter^{−1} Tricine buffer and adjusted to a pH of 8.17.

== Taxonomy ==
The highly diverse colonial and cellular morphologies among Trichodesmium species have caused much debate about the phylogeny of the genus. Upon initial discovery by Ehrenberg in 1830, the genus Trichodesmium was placed in the family Oscillatoriaceae. More recently, an examination of several key morphological characteristics, including colony formation associated with sheath production, cell differentiation along the trichome, and fatty acid composition, led to the placement of Trichodesmium thiebautii into the family Phormidiaceae and order Oscillatoriales. Many species originally placed into the family Phormidiaceae, including Trichodesmium spp., were taxonomically relocated in 2005 by two researchers, J. Komárek and K. Anagnostidis, into the family Microcoleaceae, where they remain today.

Analysis of the 16s rRNA from Trichodesmium sp. strain NlBB 1067 indicated that its closest phylogenetic neighbor is Oscillatoria PCC 7515 with 94.9% sequence similarity. This close sequence similarity did not resolve the debate on the separation of Trichodesmium into a separate genus from Oscillatoria. However, a genetic analysis of the nitrogenase nifH gene sequences of Trichodesmium spp, including T. thiebautii, revealed a distinct cluster within the cyanobacteria clade with very deep branches indicating an early evolutionary radiation. Capone et al. (1997) suggested that the large genetic distance of the nifH gene between Trichodesmium spp. and other species of cyanobacteria, including those in the genus Oscillatoria, may be due to the structural requirements of aerobic N_{2} fixation.

== Characterization ==
=== Physical characteristics ===
Members of the family Microcoleaceae have a distinct radial arrangement of their thylakoids that distinguishes them from other closely related families of cyanobacteria. Trichodesmium thiebautii is usually composed of a few to hundreds of cells in a colony and has trichomes that appear to be twisted together much like a rope with radiating ends. Researchers examining Trichodesmium spp. in surface waters across the world also observed the rope-like twisted trichomes mentioned by Gomont, under the scanning electron microscope (SEM). In the original description of T. thiebautii, each cell was said to be twice as long as it was wide. More than 100 years later, researchers were able to cultivate T. thiebautii and saw various colony morphologies ranging from solitary cells to spherical and fusiform (spindle-shaped) aggregates. T. thiebautii's most distinct physical cellular structures are a series of gas vesicles found within the cell that allow it to be naturally buoyant and remain at the ocean's surface. In lab cultures, T. thiebautii exhibits growth of 0.23 division per day, and individual cells are 4–6 μm with trichomes ranging in width from 8 to 10 μm.

=== Metabolism ===
Trichodesmium thiebautii is a simultaneous diazotroph and autotroph. These bacteria perform daily cycling of their nitrogenase enzyme. New molecules of nitrogenase are synthesized every morning, inactivated in the afternoon, and degraded at night, with a peak in enzyme activity at midday. T. thiebautii is also capable of taking up combined nitrogen (i.e., nitrate, nitrite, ammonia, urea) and will experience a reduction in nitrogenase activities when these other nitrogen sources are available to it.

=== Ecology ===
Trichodesmium species are ubiquitous to oligotrophic tropical and subtropical aquatic environments that are known for deep light penetration, clear waters and a stable water column. A key feature to the genus is the presence of gas vesicles, which allow it to stay closer to the surface for photosynthesis. They’re important ecologically due to their significant contribution of new nitrogen input for the planet’s oceans. This species is capable of forming large surface blooms that occur when wind stresses are low and Trichodesmium thiebautii is able to accumulate, undisturbed, on the surface of the water.

=== Genomics ===
Trichodesmium thiebautii has a genome size of approximately 3.29 Mb with 3370 genes of which 3335 are protein-coding. It has a G-C content of 35.35%.

== Importance ==
Trichodesmium species are known for creating surface blooms in aquatic environments under the right conditions. T. thiebautii and T. erythraeum are often the main cyanobacteria associated with production of the large blooms, though other Trichodesium species can also be found contributing to process. The blooms may cause an increase in inorganic and organic nutrients that can effect light penetration, which influences phytoplankton successions and productivity. Trichodesmium is a genus of non-heterocystous cyanobacteria with a unique metabolism that allows them to that fix N_{2} while also undergoing oxygenic photosynthesis. It has been estimated that Trichodesmium spp. are responsible for a significant portion, perhaps as much as 25%, of the nitrogen cycling in oceanic ecosystems. The role of T. thiebautii, and other members of its genus, in oceanic nitrogen cycling is significant because nitrogen is an essential element for life. Nitrogen is present in microbial cell structures and used for nucleic acid as well as protein synthesis. In aquatic habitats, nitrogen is often a limiting nutrient in regards to productivity and fixing it from the atmosphere is necessary to allow organisms to utilize it for the biosynthesis of molecules necessary for life.
