= Spirulina abbreviata =

Scientific classification
- Domain: Bacteria
- Phylum: Cyanobacteria
- Class: Cyanophyceae
- Order: Spirulinales
- Family: Spirulinaceae
- Genus: Spirulina
- Species: S. abbreviata

Binomial name
- Spirulina abbreviata Lemmermann 1895

Species of bacterium

Spirulina abbreviata is a marine cyanobacterium from the genus Spirulina.
