= Kamfers Dam =

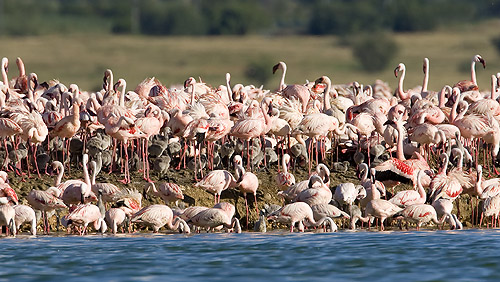
- Lesser flamingos on Kamfers Dam's artificial breeding island, 2008

- Location within Northern Cape
- Coordinates: 28°40′22″S 24°45′48″E
- Type: reservoir
- Basin countries: South Africa
- Surface elevation: 1,180 m (3,870 ft)

Kamfers Dam is a privately owned permanent water body of 400 ha, situated to the immediate north of Kimberley, South Africa. The wetland was originally an ephemeral pan, often dry and dependent on rain water. In recent times its water level rose due to the input of constant runoff and treated water from the growing city of Kimberley.

The area of water at the dam has become a major breeding site for lesser flamingos since the construction of an artificial island. The dam and surrounding 380ha wetland area are designated as a conservation zone in the city's draft spatial development plan. In 2008, pollution and rezoning of nearby land for the proposed Northgate development became a contentious issue, with conservationists raising alarm.

== Lesser flamingos ==
The dam harbours high concentrations of blue-green algae (Spirulina spp) and diatoms (Cyclotella spp.), the main food sources for its plentiful lesser flamingos. The dam typically supports 20,000 lesser flamingos, but occasionally over 50,000 individuals are present, a large proportion of the subregion's total population. The birds are mobile and commute between the major feeding sites in southern Africa.

=== Construction of island ===
The dam has become an important breeding site for lesser flamingos since an artificial S-shaped breeding island was constructed in September 2006. Ornithologist Mark D. Anderson enlisted the help of a local company Ekapa Mining, who moved 26,000 tons of material to create the island. All was delivered along a narrow 200m causeway, and deposited in an S-shape to create two bays.

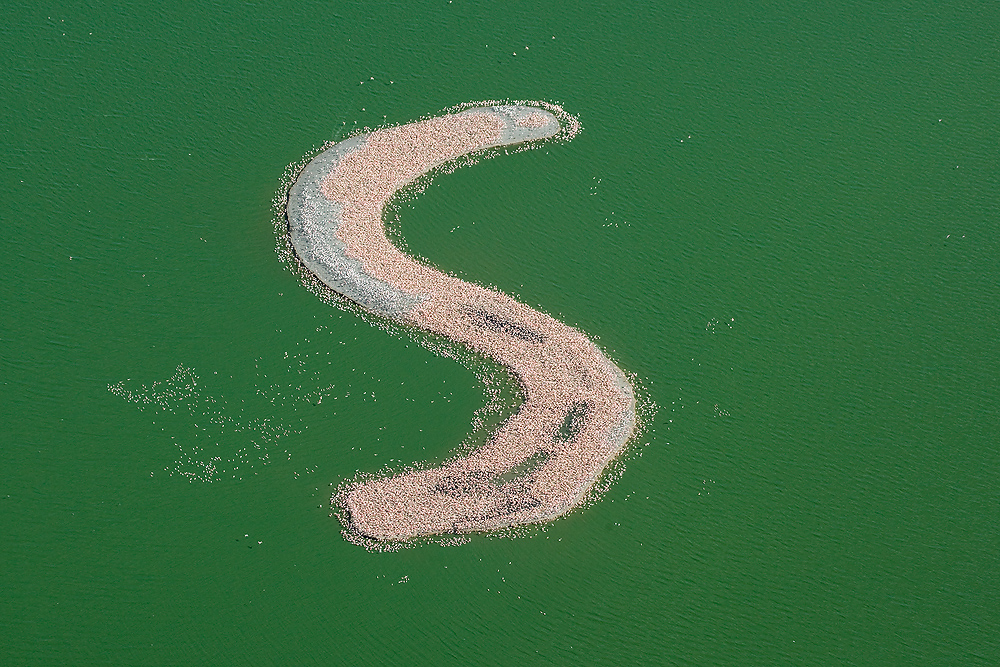
2,000 adult lesser flamingos assembled on an artificial S-shaped breeding island in Kamfers Dam

A submerged pump driven by solar panels delivers water to four ponds where the flamingos can collect clay to build their nest turrets. A thousand artificial nest turrets were constructed in the hope that flamingos would settle on the island, and within weeks some 10,000 birds had arrived. These birds departed for winter but a larger flock of some 20,000 returned in September 2007 and commenced breeding over the midsummer months, ignoring the man-made turrets and building their own.

=== Conservation value ===
In the summer season of 2007/8 almost two thousand pairs of lesser flamingo bred on the island, producing an estimated 9,000 chicks. The breeding success is expected to reverse the recent negative population trend in the southern population. This breeding colony became the first for the species in South Africa, the fourth in Africa and one of only 6 globally (3 in Africa and 3 in India).

The new breeding site is considered to be of special importance as the most important Lake Natron is threatened by proposed soda ash mining, while Etosha Pan is only productive once every 9 years. The island also offers unusual insight into flamingo biology since typical breeding sites are much less accessible. Webcams are to be installed when the flamingos vacate the island, to facilitate observations and to increase public awareness.

== Conservation controversies ==
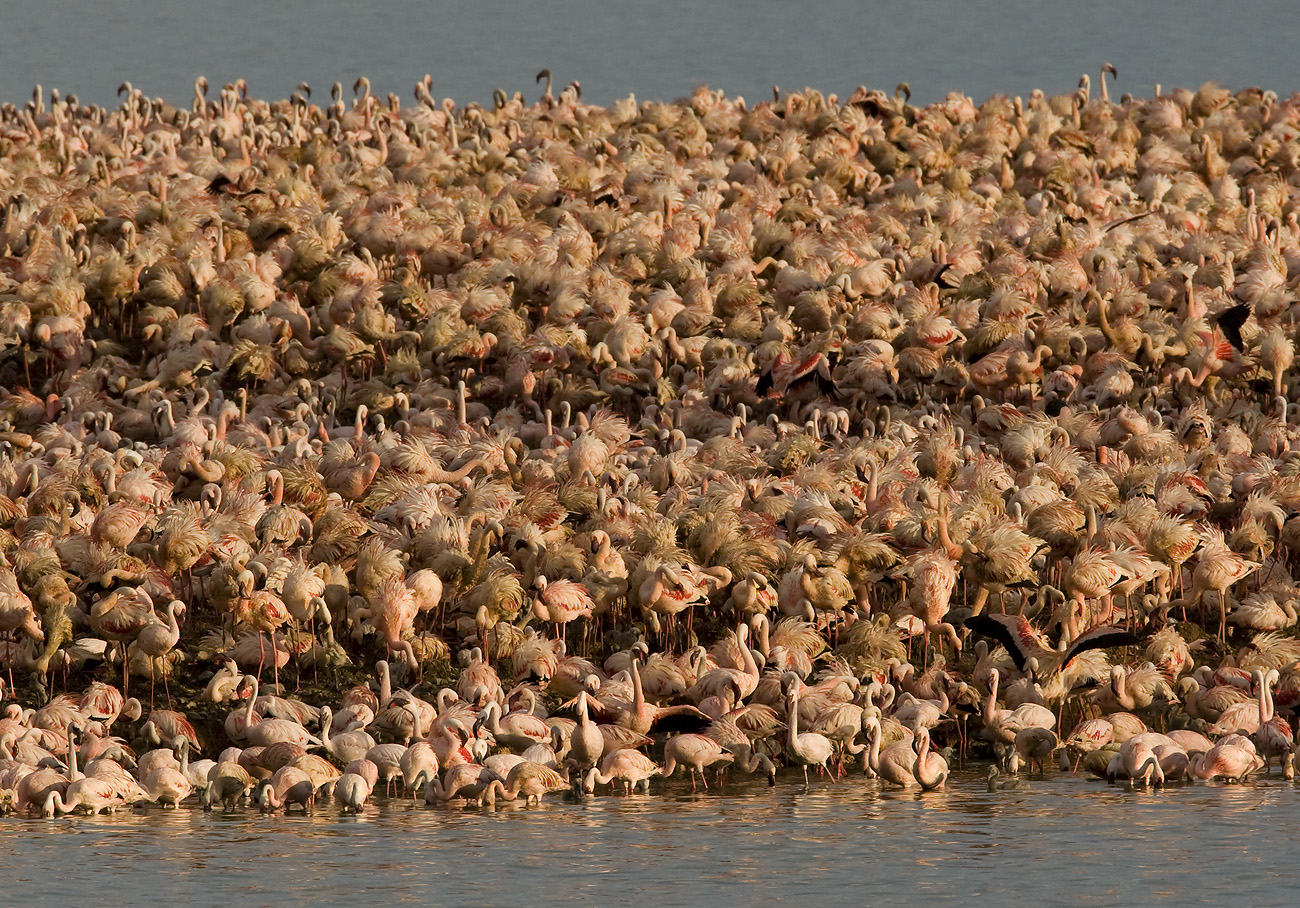
Lesser flamingos on Kamfers Dam's artificial breeding island, 2006

As of 2008 conservationists are at odds with city officials and developers due to pollution and plans for nearby residential and business development. Conservationists appealed to the public to oppose the developers and proposed a solution to the pollution problem.

=== Pollution ===
Severe algal bloom was noticed in the dam during February 2008, raising fears of an outbreak of toxic Microcystis algae. Observed abnormalities in some birds were ascribed to the poor water quality. In June 2008 it was found that the sewage plant of the Homevale municipal works was ineffective and leaking sewage into the dam, in contravention of South African water legislation. City conservationists and engineers proposed a solution, solicited help from the public and raised general awareness. Discussions with the Sol Plaatje Local Municipality were deadlocked on the issue.

=== Northgate development ===
A contentious rezoning of adjacent land, predicted to increase pollution and disturbance, was once again opposed by conservationists and the like-minded public. The proposed developments along the shore of the dam would include both residential and business properties.

The controversy escalated in August 2008 when the city of Kimberley suspended three officials of the Northern Cape department of conservation and tourism, pending disciplinary hearings. By doing so the city also effectively sidelined these officials from discussions about the Northgate development's EIA.

== History note ==
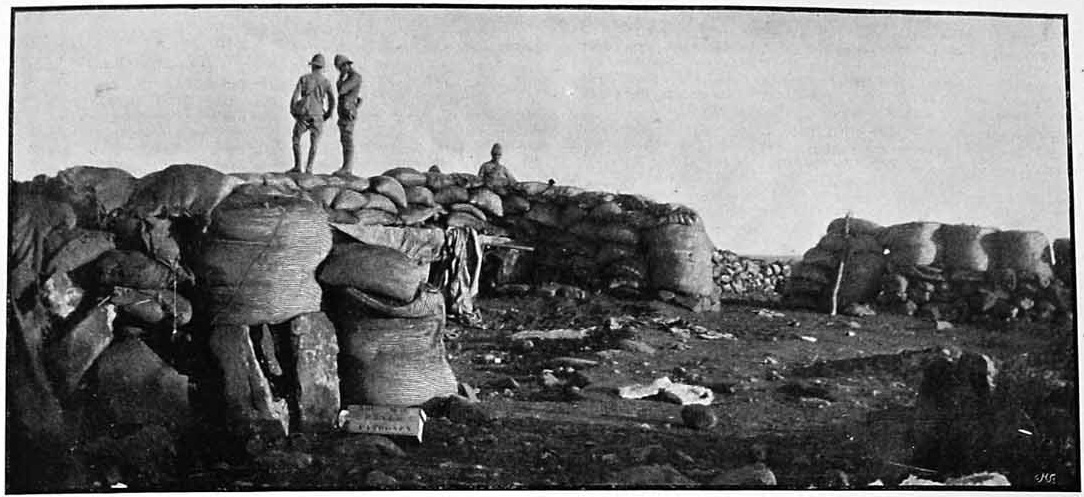
Vacated Boer firing position at Kamfers Dam

During the Siege of Kimberley, Kamfers Dam was the scene of a skirmish on December 9, 1899. Subsequently a large Boer cannon which started firing 96 lb. shells at the town on February 7, 1900 was stationed at Kamfers Dam. A number of cavalry sorties were made from Kimberley in attempts to capture it. The heavy gun and its crew however evaded capture after the relief of the siege, when its retreat was covered by Boer defensive positions at Dronfield.

== Mass Flamingo Exodus ==
According to 2025 report, once home to tens of thousands of breeding flamingos, Kamfers Dam has been abandoned after years of pollution. The local sewage treatment plant became progressively dysfunctional over time which discharged approximately 36 megaliters of untreated sewage into the dam each day. This influx of contaminated water devastated the habitat and thus forcing the flamingos to flee. The population of flamingos gathered to breed in May 2020 reached around 71,000 with up to 5,000 chicks hatching during the breeding season.

Despite earlier successes, the ecological health of Kamfers Dam has rapidly deteriorated. Outbreaks of botulism which is a lethal disease linked to polluted water have earlier also claimed the lives of many birds.

Earlier in 2019, harsh summer heat combined with a reported halt in water being pumped into Kamfers Dam caused the area to dry up. Around 2,000 baby flamingos were left stranded in sweltering conditions when their habitat disappeared. To save them, the chicks had to be airlifted with help of a mining company aircraft to a conservation center nearly 950 km (590 mi) away in Cape Town.
