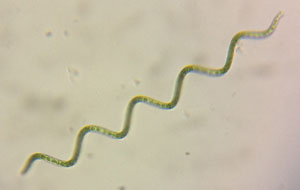
- A single Limnospira platensis colony

Scientific classification
- Domain: Bacteria
- Kingdom: Bacillati
- Phylum: Cyanobacteriota
- Class: Cyanophyceae
- Order: Oscillatoriales
- Family: Sirenicapillariaceae
- Genus: Limnospira; Nowicka-Krawczyk et al. 2019 emend. Pinchart et al. 2024

Type species
- Limnospira maxima (Setchell and Gardner) Nowicka-Krawczyk et al. 2019

Species
- L. maxima; Heterotypic synonyms: L. fusiformis, L. indica; L. platensis; "L. erdosensis"

= Limnospira =

Genus of Cyanobacteria

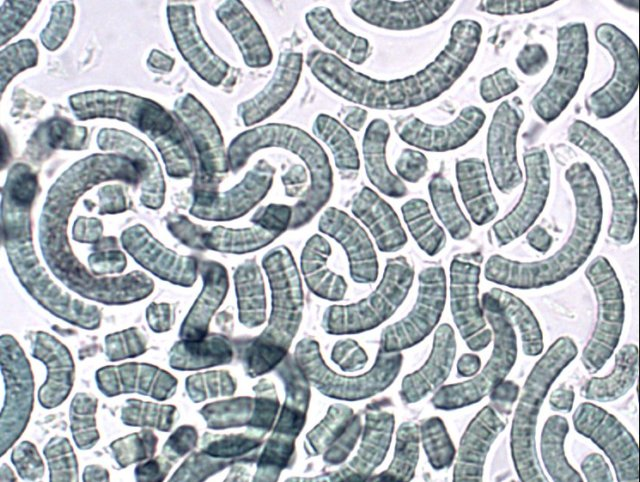
Spirulina powder, from the genus Limnospira, on unstained wet mount under 400x magnification

Limnospira is a genus of free-floating filamentous cyanobacteria characterized by cylindrical, multicellular trichomes in an open left-hand helix. A dietary supplement is made from L. platensis and L. maxima, known as spirulina. It was split from Arthrospira in 2019.

The two species were commonly treated as if they are in the genus Spirulina since 1932, even though they were originally proposed in Arthorospira in 1892 and 1917. The distinction was restored in the late 20th century. Although the introduction of the two separate genera Arthrospira and Spirulina is now generally accepted, there has been much dispute in the past and the resulting taxonomical confusion is tremendous. To add to the problem, it was shown in 2019 that the type species for Arthrospira, A. jenneri, was very distantly related to the species used in food production. This necessitated the creation of yet another genus, Limnospira, to hold these economically-important species.

== Taxonomy ==
The common name, spirulina, refers to the dried biomass of Arthrospira platensis (now L. platensis), a type of Cyanobacteria, which are oxygenic (produce oxygen) photosynthetic bacteria. These photosynthetic organisms were first considered to be algae, a very large and diverse group of eukaryotic organisms, until 1962 when they were reclassified as prokaryotes and named Cyanobacteria. This designation was accepted and published in 1974 by Bergey's Manual of Determinative Bacteriology.

Scientifically, quite a distinction exists between the Spirulina and Arthrospira genera. Stizenberger, in 1852, gave the name Arthrospira based on the presence of septa, its helical form, and its multicellular structure, and Gomont, in 1892, confirmed the aseptate form of the genus Spirulina. Geitler in 1932 reunified both members designating them as Spirulina without considering the septum. Research on microalgae was carried out in the name of Spirulina, but the original species used to produce the dietary supplement spirulina belongs to the genus Arthrospira. This misnomer has been difficult to correct.

As of 2010, taxonomy states that the name spirulina for strains which are used as food supplements is inappropriate, and agreement exists that Arthrospira is a distinct genus, consisting of over 30 different species, including A. platensis and A. maxima.

A 2019 analysis of Arthrospira species using 16S rRNA gene sequence suggests that the type species of this genus (A. jenneri) is much closer to Planktothrix clade than previously thought. It also lacks characteristics of mass produced species (such as preference of alkaline habitats). As a result, researchers proposed a new genus closer to Limnoraphis and Neolyngbya called Limnospira comprising L. fusiformis, L. maxima and L. indica. A further 2024 study confirmed that L. platensis should be in this genus, but also found that L. fusiformis and L. indica are insufficiently different from L. maxima to be their own species.

== Morphology ==
The genus Arthrospira comprises helical trichomes of varying size and with various degrees of coiling, including tightly-coiled morphology to a straight form.

The helical parameters of the shape of Arthrospira is used to differentiate between and even within the same species. These differences may be induced by changing environmental conditions, such as temperature. The helical shape of the trichomes is only maintained in a liquid environment. The filaments are solitary and reproduce by binary fission, and the cells of the trichomes vary in length from 2 to 12 μm and can sometimes reach 16 μm.

== Biochemical composition ==
Limnospira is very rich in proteins, and constitute 53 to 68 percent by dry weight of the contents of the cell. Its protein harbours all essential amino acids. Limnospira also contain high amounts of polyunsaturated fatty acids (PUFAs), about 1.5–2 percent, and a total lipid content of 5–6 percent. These PUFAs contain the γ-linolenic acid (GLA), an omega-6 fatty acid. Further contents of Limnospira include vitamins, minerals and photosynthetic pigments.

== Occurrence ==
Species of the genera Limnospira have been isolated from alkaline brackish and saline waters in tropical and subtropical regions. Among the various species included in the genus, L. platensis is the most widely distributed and is mainly found in Africa, but also in Asia. L. maxima is believed to be found in California and Mexico. L. platensis and L. maxima occur naturally in tropical and subtropical lakes with alkaline pH and high concentrations of carbonate and bicarbonate. L. platensis occurs in Africa, Asia and South America, whereas L. maxima is confined to Central America. Most cultivated spirulina is produced in open-channel raceway ponds, with paddle-wheels used to agitate the water. The largest commercial producers of spirulina are located in the United States, Thailand, India, Taiwan, China, Pakistan, Myanmar, Greece and Chile.

An invalid name "Arthrospira pacifica" has been used to describe an algae found in Hawaii, also used for "spirulina" production through cultivation in raceway ponds. Although no sequence data is available, its use suggests that it is likely some form of Limnospira.

== Present and future uses ==
Spirulina is widely known as a food supplement, but there are other possible uses for this cyanobacterium. As an example, it is suggested to be used medically for patients for whom it is difficult to chew or swallow food, or as a natural and cheap drug delivery system. Further, promising results in the treatment of certain cancers, allergies and anemia, as well as hepatotoxicity and vascular diseases were found. Spirulina may also be used as a healthy addition to animal feed if the price of its production can be further reduced

Spirulina can be used in technical applications, such as the biosynthesis of silver nanoparticles, which allows the formation of metallic silver in an environmentally friendly way. In the creation of textiles it harbors some advantages, since it can be used for the production of antimicrobial textiles and paper or polymer materials.

They also may have an antioxidant effect and may maintain the ecological balance in aquatic bodies and reduces various stresses in the aquatic environment.

== Cropping systems ==
Growth of L. platensis depends on several factors. To achieve maximum output, factors such as the temperature, light and photoinhibition, nutrients and carbon dioxide level, need to be adjusted.

In summer the main limiting factor of spirulina growth is light. When growing in water depths of 12–15 cm, self-shading governs the growth of the individual cell. However, research has shown, that growth is also photoinhibited, and can be increased through shading. The level of photoinhibition versus the lack of light is always a question of cell concentration in the medium.

The optimal growth temperature for L. platensis is 35–38 °C. This poses a major limiting factor outside the tropics, confining growth to the summer months. L. platensis has been grown in fresh water, as well as in brackish water and sea water. Apart from mineral fertilizer, various sources such as waste effluents, and effluents from fertilizer, starch and noodle factories have been used as a nutrient source.

Waste effluents are more readily available in rural locations, allowing small scale production. One of the major hurdles for large scale production is the complicated harvesting process which accounts for 20–30% of the total production costs. Due to their small cell size, and diluted cultures (mass concentration less than 1 g/L) with densities close to that of water microalgae, they are difficult to separate from their growing medium.

== Cultivation systems ==
=== Open pond ===
Open pond systems are the most common way to grow L. platensis due to their comparatively low cost. Typically, channels are built in form of a raceway from concrete or PVC coated earth walls, and water is moved by paddle wheels. The open design, however allows contamination by foreign algae and/or microorganisms.

Another problem includes water loss due to evaporation. Both of these problems can be addressed by covering the channels with transparent polyethylene film.

=== Closed system ===
Closed systems have the advantage of being able to control the physical, chemical and biological environment. This allows for increased yield, and more control of the nutrient level. Typical forms such as tubes or polyethylene bags, also offer a larger surface-to-volume ratios than open pond systems, thus increasing the amount of sunlight available for photosynthesis. These closed systems help expanding the growing period into the winter months, but often lead to overheating in summer.

== Market potentials and feasibility ==
Cultivation of Limnospira has occurred for a long period of time, especially in Mexico and around Lake Chad on the African continent. During the 21st century however, its beneficial properties were rediscovered and therefore studies about Limnospira and its production increased. In the past decades, large-scale production of the cyanobacterium developed. Japan started in 1960, and in the following years Mexico and several other countries over all continents, such as China, India, Thailand, Myanmar and the United States started to produce on large-scale. In little time, China has become the largest producer worldwide. A particular advantage of the production and use of spirulina is that its production can be conducted at a number of different scales, from household culture to intensive commercial production over large areas.

Especially as a small-scale crop, Limnospira still has considerable potential for development, for example for nutritional improvement. New countries where this could happen, should dispose of alkaline-rich ponds on high altitudes or saline-alkaline-rich groundwater or coastal areas with high temperature. Otherwise, technical inputs needed for new spirulina farms are quite basic.

The international market of spirulina is divided into two target groups: the one includes NGO’s and institutions focusing on malnutrition and the other includes health conscious people. There are still some countries, especially in Africa, that produce at a local level. Those could respond to the international demand by increasing production and economies of scale. Growing the product in Africa could offer an advantage in price, due to low costs of labour. On the other hand, African countries would have to surpass quality standards from importing countries, which could again result in higher costs.

== Phylogeny ==
As of 2025, the only sequenced species is Limnospira platensis. As a result the GTDB does not produce an informative tree. Existing sources generally use a single locus, usually 16S rRNA, ITS, or the phycocyanin operon cpcBA.

16S rRNA tree, trimmed to show important genera (1800 bp fragment from Nowicka-Krawczyk et al. 2019):

- - - - Arthrospira jenneri
      - Planktothrix
    - - Microcoleus + Tychonema
      - Kamptonema
  - Hydrocoleum + Lyngbya + Oscillatoria sancta + Okeania
- - - - Sirenicapillariaceae
      - - Limnospira
          - - L. maxima
            - L. platensis
          - "A. erdosensis"
        - - Limnoraphis
          - Neolyngbya
      - Planktothricoides
  - - Laspinema
    - Oxynema
