= Spirulina magnifica =

Scientific classification
- Domain: Bacteria
- Phylum: Cyanobacteria
- Class: Cyanophyceae
- Order: Spirulinales
- Family: Spirulinaceae
- Genus: Spirulina
- Species: S. magnifica

Binomial name
- Spirulina magnifica J.J.Copeland 2001

Synonyms
- Spirulina caldaria var. magnifica

Species of bacterium

Spirulina magnifica is a cyanobacteria from the genus Spirulina which occur in freshwater.
