= Spirulina agilis =

Scientific classification
- Domain: Bacteria
- Phylum: Cyanobacteria
- Class: Cyanophyceae
- Order: Spirulinales
- Family: Spirulinaceae
- Genus: Spirulina
- Species: S. agilis

Binomial name
- Spirulina agilis Kufferath 1914

Species of bacterium

Spirulina agilis is a freshwater cyanobacterium from the genus Spirulina.
