= Spirulina agilissima =

Scientific classification
- Domain: Bacteria
- Phylum: Cyanobacteria
- Class: Cyanophyceae
- Order: Spirulinales
- Family: Spirulinaceae
- Genus: Spirulina
- Species: S. agilissima

Binomial name
- Spirulina agilissima (Lagerheim) Kirchner in Engler & Prantl 1900

Species of bacterium

Spirulina agilissima is a freshwater cyanobacteria from the genus Spirulina.
