= Trichodesmium erythraeum =

Scientific classification
- Domain: Bacteria
- Kingdom: Bacillati
- Phylum: Cyanobacteriota
- Class: Cyanophyceae
- Order: Oscillatoriales
- Family: Microcoleaceae
- Genus: Trichodesmium
- Species: T. erythraeum

Binomial name
- Trichodesmium erythraeum Ehrenburg ex Gomont

Macroscopic species of filamentous, non-heterocystous cyanobacteria

Trichodesmium erythraeum is a marine cyanobacteria species characterized by its prolific diazotrophic capabilities. They play a dominant role in the ocean ecosystem, supplying a steady and significant source of new, biologically available nitrogen and cycling phosphorus. By nature of its filamentous morphology, T. erythraeum is also known to congregate into large, long colonies, sizeable enough to be seen as sawdust-like particles to the naked eye and pigmented marine regions in satellite images, typically found in oligotrophic tropical and subtropical waters. These blooms are responsible for the famous coloration of the Red Sea.

== Etymology and nomenclature ==
The genus name is inspired from the ancient Greek roots: Tricho- meaning 'hair' and -desmós, meaning band or connection. The species name erythraeum is also derived from the Greek Eruthraî or the related Latin term Erythraeus which means red or reddish. The historical Greek root is also used in Erythrà Thálassa, which translates to and is known as the Red Sea or the Erythraean Sea.

== History ==
=== Discovery ===
The Trichodesmium genus was first described by James Cook in 1770 while traveling along the subtropical coast of Australia. Charles Darwin had also reportedly recorded the unique Trichodesmium blooms while on his famous voyage on the Beagle, describing it as "sea sawdust". Christian Gottfried Ehrenberg named this particular species - Trichodesmium erythraeum - in 1830 as he was traveling across the Red Sea during a period of red bloom. In the following century, other scientists on seafaring expeditions would come to name other Trichodesmium species such as T. thiebautti, T. hildebrandtii, and T. contortum. While there is still uncertainty about their taxonomy and phylogenetic relationships, T. erythraeum is the most well-studied species as well as the only one whose genome has been sequenced within the genus.

=== Isolation/methods ===
Trichodesmium erythraeum was first isolated and sequenced in 1991 from the Atlantic coast of North Carolina. Researchers Prufert-Debout, Pearl, and Lassen modified seawater medium with 0.1 N HCl and 0.1 N NaOH to reach a basic pH of 8.17, then tested for growth of individual algal cells in variations of the culture medium. In order to further isolate the Trichodesmium, they added cycloheximide, effectively killing eukaryotic microbial colonies. They maintained sterile growth media, closely monitoring then measuring the growth and formation of bacterial aggregates. The Trichodesmium cultures were incubated on a light-dark cycle at 24 °C atop a shake table to simulate tidal movement. This experiment yielded various morphological arrangements of aggregated T. erythraeum IMS101 filaments.

== Morphology ==
Trichodesmium erythraeum is a motile, Gram-negative cyanobacteria. They can exist in single filaments, but are more commonly found in colonial morphologies composed of up to several hundreds of filaments. Generally, Trichodesmium can aggregate in parallel to form a fusiform (tuft) colony or radial (puff) form. The defining characteristic of T. erythraeum is its pigment composition, containing chlorophyll A and phycoerythrin. Phycoerythrin is a photosynthetic pigment that causes T. erythraeum to reflect its eponymous rusty red color. At least 50% of the T. erythraeum cell is occupied by large gas-filled vacuoles which aid in buoyancy and alignment with other cells in colonial formation.

== Genomics ==
Trichodesmium erythraeum is the sole Trichodesmium species with a fully sequenced genome, and it remains one of the larger cyanobacterial genomes currently sequenced, at around 7.75 Mbp in length. Among 58 cyanobacterial genomes, phylogenetic analysis indicates T. erythraeum is closely related to the genera Lyngbya, inhabitants of marine waters, and Arthrospira, primarily found in more alkaline lakes, as part of a larger lineage made up of filamentous non-heterocystous species within the order Oscillatoriales. Though T. erythraeum is non-heterocystous, recent findings in comparative genomics support relatedness to heterocystous cyanobacteria genera.

=== Related species ===
The genus Trichodesmium encompasses 5 other species apart from T. erythraeum, characterized and differentiated by cell and colony morphology, pigmentation, and buoyancy. These 5 species were originally organized into two different clades, categorized according to the cellular arrangement and consequent regulation of buoyancy, as well as their glycogen clusters, which facilitate carbon storage. In one clade, there was T. erythraeum and T. tenue, while the other clade held T. thiebautti, T. hildebrandtii, and T. contortum. However, recent genomic analysis aimed at species differentiation revealed three distinct clades, reorganizing the six species as follows: 1) T. thiebautti, T. hildebrandtii, 2) T. contortum, T. tenue, and 3) T. erythraeum.

== Physiology ==
Trichodesmium erythraeum plays an important role in aquatic microenvironments, specifically in warm and nutrient-scarce oceans, where its diazotrophic metabolism contributes a substantial amount of fixed nitrogen (~50% of total N from all six Trichodesmium species) to these ecosystems. One of the defining features of T. erythraeum is its ability to conduct nitrogen fixation and carbon sequestration simultaneously without forming heterocysts, as opposed to other cyanobacterial species capable of these processes.

=== Metabolism ===
For non-heterocystous N_{2}-fixing cyanobacteria, metabolism is normally defined by two specialized separation strategies: N_{2} fixation occurring at night and photosynthesis during the light of day. Interestingly, Trichodesmium performs both oxygenic photosynthesis and atmospheric nitrogen fixation exclusively during the day, attributed to 1) enhanced O_{2} consumption during peak nitrogenase activity and 2) conglomeration of the O_{2}-sensitive nitrogenase enzyme complexes within "diazocytes", or localized sets of cells within the filamentous colony. While T. erythraeum can carry out these processes simultaneously, studies have shown that photosynthesis and nitrogen fixation may follow a circadian rhythm. In addition, nitrogen fixation by T. erythraeum depends on the availability of inorganic phosphorus and iron, as nutrient limitation may inhibit population growth. In particular, the Trichodesmium IMS101 genome has protein-encoding genes that are advantageous for growth in oligotrophic, low-phosphate environments. The orientation of T. erythraeum in its environment can directly affect its metabolic activity. Specifically, Trichodesmium blooms generally occur at ocean surface where they can access atmospheric nitrogen for diazotrophy; however, sub-surface colonies are also occasionally observed, likely utilizing dissolved nitrogen or other nitrogen sources from the ocean depths.

== Ecology ==
Trichodesmium blooms are integral to marine ecosystems because of their nitrogen fixation capabilities, uptake of phosphorus, and supply of substrates that in turn provision of shelter for marine life. These blooms depend on several factors: warm oceans, high salt content, and a steady supply of light and nutrients (Fe and P, specifically). One bloom, recorded in the Arabian Sea, coincided with increased bioavailability of trace metals, highlighting their importance in Trichodesmium metabolism, as well as the ecological implications of these blooms.

== Significance and applications ==
Recent reports of unprecedented T. erythraeum blooms in the Mediterranean, Andaman, and Arabian Seas underscore the toxic nature and potential harmful effects of these blooms. In the Andaman Sea, an increase in water temperature and an upsurge in salinity resulted in lower rates of hooking fish, while increases in pH and decreased oxygen availability led to greater fish mortality in the Arabian Sea. As global warming persists, changes in the temperature and marine composition of traditional Trichodesmium habitats may induce a greater frequency of blooms. Ocean acidification has also stimulated increased production of reactive oxygen species (ROS) and exopolysaccharides (EPS) by T. erythraeum which may further aggravate environmental imbalance. Under ordinary circumstances, T. erythraeum blooms confer many benefits to marine ecosystems, however irregular and frequent blooms coinciding with ongoing climate change may prove detrimental to these environments in the long run.
