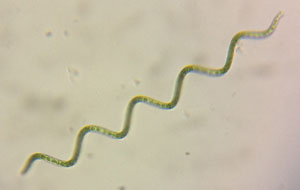
- A single Limnospira platensis colony

Scientific classification
- Domain: Bacteria
- Kingdom: Bacillati
- Phylum: Cyanobacteriota
- Class: Cyanophyceae
- Order: Oscillatoriales
- Family: Sirenicapillariaceae
- Genus: Limnospira
- Species: L. platensis

Binomial name
- Limnospira platensis (Gomont) Santos and Hentschke 2023

Synonyms
- Arthrospira platensis Gomont 1892; Limnospira platensis (Gomont) Pinchart et al. 2024

= Limnospira platensis =

Species of bacterium

Limnospira platensis is a filamentous, gram-negative cyanobacterium that forms helical colonies known as trichomes. This bacterium is a non-nitrogen-fixing photoautotroph. It has been isolated from Chenghai Lake, China, soda lakes of East Africa, and subtropical, alkaline lakes.

Limnospira platensis is commonly known as Spirulina or blue-green algae.

== Morphology ==
Limnospira platensis is filamentous, motile bacterium. Motility has been described as a vigorous gliding without a visible flagella.

== Metabolism ==
As a photoautotroph the major carbon source is carbon dioxide and water is a source of electrons to perform CO_{2} reduction.

== Genetics ==
Limnospira platensis has a single circular chromosome containing 6.8 Mbp and 6,631 genes. The G+C content has been determined to be 44.3%.

== Growth conditions ==
Limnospira platensis has been found in environments with high concentrations of carbonate and bicarbonate. It can also be found in high salt concentrations because of its alkali and salt tolerance. The temperature optimum for this organism is around 35 °C. Based on environmental conditions, culture medium often has a pH between 9–10, inorganic salts, and a high bicarbonate concentration.

== Uses ==
There are various present and past uses of L. platensis as food or food supplement, which is better known as 'Spirulina' in this context. Spirulina is sold as a health supplement in the form of powder or tablets due to its high levels of essential and unsaturated fatty acids, vitamins, dietary minerals, and antioxidants. After the Chernobyl disaster, Spirulina was given to victims due to its antioxidant properties to avoid adverse effects of reactive oxygen species. Proteins extracted from L. platensis can be used in food as thickening agents or stabilizers for emulsions or foams. A direct comparison indicates that L. platensis protein isolates are more effective at reducing surface tension compared to commonly used animal proteins. The light-harvesting complex of L. platensis, phycocyanin, can be extracted as a blue pigment powder and used as blue colorant in food. As L. platensis cells contain hydrogenases and can produce hydrogen, they are a candidate for the production of renewable energy.
