= Kamptonema chlorinum =

Scientific classification
- Domain: Bacteria
- Kingdom: Bacillati
- Phylum: Cyanobacteriota
- Class: Cyanophyceae
- Order: Oscillatoriales
- Family: Microcoleaceae
- Genus: Kamptonema
- Species: K. chlorinum

Binomial name
- Kamptonema chlorinum (Kützing ex Gomont) Strunecký, Komárek & J.Smarda, 2014

Species of bacterium

Kamptonema chlorinum is a species of cyanobacteria belonging to the family Microcoleaceae.

Synonym:

- Oscillatoria chlorina Kützing ex Gomont (= basionym)
