= Microcoil =

3D printing of a solenoid microcoil using a conductive mixture of polylactide and carbon nanotubes.

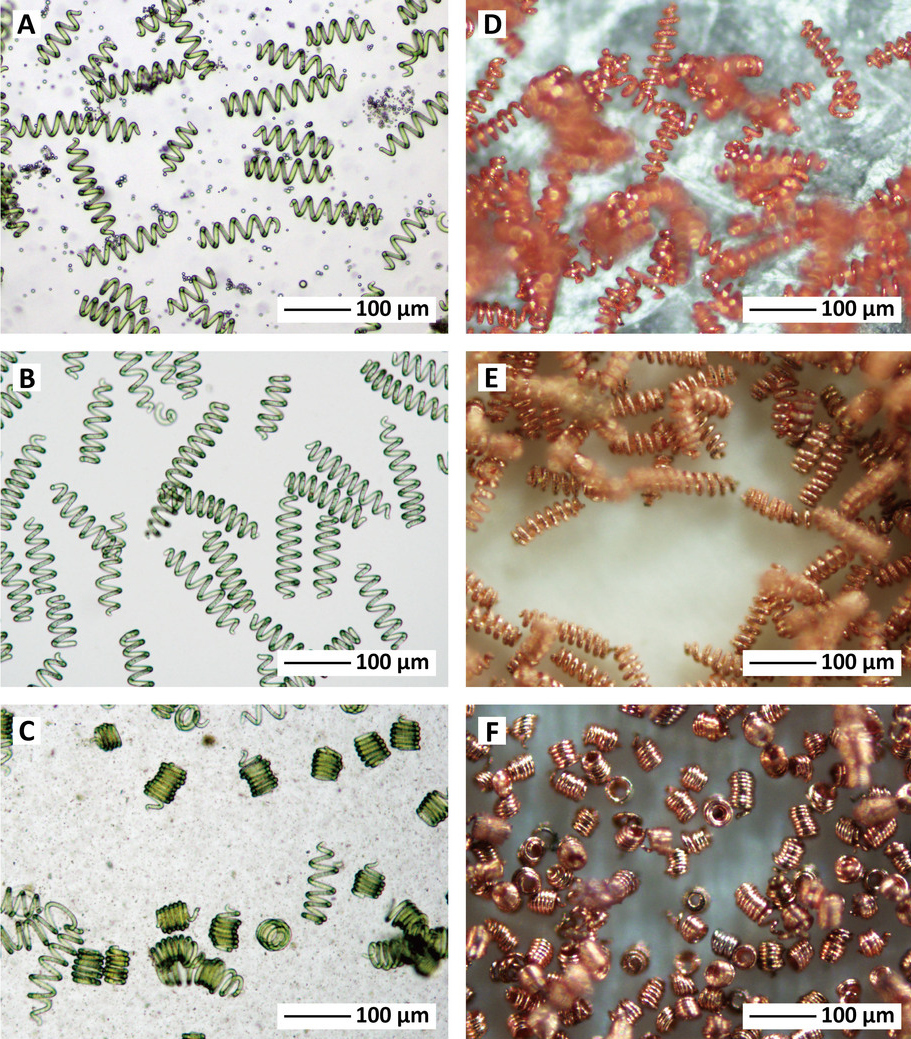
Microcoils produced by electroplating copper on Spirulina bacteria.

A microcoil is a tiny electrical conductor such as a wire in the shape of a spiral or helix which could be a solenoid or a planar structure.

== Uses ==
=== NMR spectroscopy and micro-MRI ===
One field where these are found is nuclear magnetic resonance (NMR) spectroscopy, where it identifies radio frequency (RF) coils that are smaller than 1 mm.

The detection limits of micro-MRI or MRM can be pushed further by taking advantage of microsystem fabrication techniques. In general, the RF receiver coil should closely conform to the sample to ensure good detection sensitivity. A properly designed NMR probe will maximize both the observe factor, which is the ratio of the sample volume being observed by the RF coil to the total sample volume required for analysis, and the filling factor, the ratio of the sample volume being observed by the RF coil to the coil volume.

The miniaturization of NMR probes thus involves two advantages:

1. Increased sensitivity without which the analysis of such low concentration compounds would be impossible, and
2. Increase of filling factor by matching the probe to the sample volume. Still, the extraction of the NMR spectra of samples having smaller and smaller volumes is a real challenge. Either these reductions of volume are dictated by the difficulties of production of sufficiently large samples or by the necessities of miniaturization of the analysing system, in both cases a careful design of the radiofrequency coils, ensuring an optimum reception of the NMR signal, are required.

=== Spin control ===
In the field of quantum sciences, microcoils play an increasing role for fast spin control in nanoscale devices as multi-qubit spin registers and quantum memories or for the actuation of single nuclear spins e.g. around a Nitrogen-vacancy center. In contrast to traditional NMR, microcoils are used here as an actuator only. The nuclear spin signal is detected via the optical readout of a single electron spin.

=== Telemetry systems ===
Microcoils have found usefulness in telemetry systems, where planar microcoils are used to supply energy to miniaturized implants.

== Microcoil types ==
Different types of microcoils with different fabrication techniques are employed for NMR:

=== Solenoid microcoils ===
Is the classical geometry to create a magnetic field with an electric current. Even for a limited number of windings this geometry provides a reasonable homogeneous B_{1} field and a good filling factor is possible by winding the coil directly onto a holder containing the sample. Miniaturization to a scale of several hundred micrometers (μm) is not very difficult although the wire diameter (typically 20 to 50 μm) becomes very small and a freestanding coil is a very delicate object. A reduction to below 100 μm diameter is possible but the machining and handling of such coils will be rather tedious. For this reason other microsystem fabrication technology such as bulk micromachining, LIGA and micro-injection molding should be applied. For solenoid coils adding more turns to the coil will enhance the B_{1}/i ratio and thus both the inductance and the signal response. At the same time the coil resistance will increase linearly, so the improvement in sensitivity will be proportional to the square root of the number of turns (n). At the same time we will have a larger ohmic heating at the center of the coil and an enhanced danger for arcing, so the optimum is generally found for only a limited number of turns. Besides RF performance, static field distortions due to susceptibility effects are an important factor in the design of microcoil probeheads.

=== Planar microcoils ===
Is the most common geometry used, based on a spiral design with the center winding contacted to the outside using a connection to another layer which is electrically isolated with a thin oxide layer. In this configuration the axis of the RF coil will be oriented perpendicular to the external static field B_{0}.

=== Saddle microcoils ===
The saddle coil shows the most complex geometry of these three coil types. The B_{1} field is generated primarily by the four vertical wire segments. Because of this coil geometry, the B_{1} field of a saddle coil is more homogeneous in z direction than that of a planar coil. The saddle coil can be formed from wire, but it is also often etched from thin copper foil, which is then adhered to glass or PTFE tubing. The latter procedure leads to a high geometric precision, resulting in better B_{1} homogeneity. The saddle coil is easily accessible and provides a good 'filling factor' of the usable area in the magnet bore. For these reasons it is widely used in NMR microscopy. However, these advantages are achieved at the price of decreased sensitivity. Compared to a saddle coil, the sensitivity performance of a solenoidal coil of the same dimensions is approximately three times better.

=== Self-assembled microcoils ===
Self-assembled rolled-up micro coils with diameters down to 50 μm have been developed for NMR microscopy.
