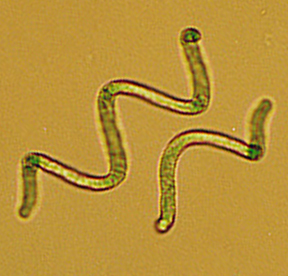

Scientific classification
- Domain: Bacteria
- Kingdom: Bacillati
- Phylum: Cyanobacteriota
- Class: Cyanophyceae
- Order: Spirulinales
- Family: Spirulinaceae
- Genus: Spirulina; Turpin ex Gomont, 1892

Species
- See text

= Spirulina (genus) =

Genus of bacteria

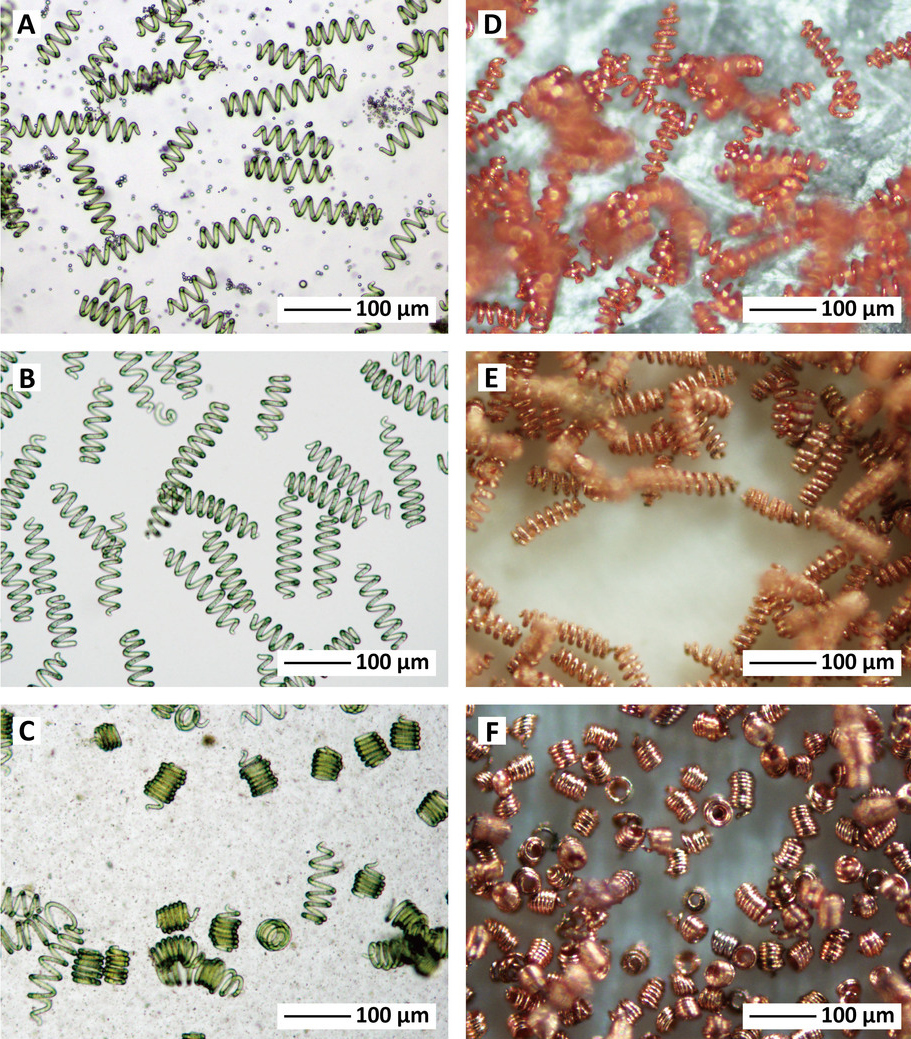
Microcoils produced by electroplating copper on Spirulina bacteria.

Spirulina is a genus of cyanobacteria. Despite its name, the "spirulina" dietary supplement actually uses the dried biomass of cyanobacteria belonging to the genus Arthrospira (which were formerly classified within Spirulina).

== Species ==
- Spirulina abbreviata
- Spirulina agilis
- Spirulina agilissima
- Spirulina albida
- Spirulina ardissoni
- Spirulina baltica
- Spirulina bayannurensis
- Spirulina breviarticulata
- Spirulina cabrerae
- Spirulina caldaria
- Spirulina cavanillesiana
- Spirulina condensata
- Spirulina corakiana
- Spirulina flavovirens
- Spirulina funiformis
- Spirulina gessneri
- Spirulina gomontiana
- Spirulina gomontii
- Spirulina gordiana
- Spirulina gracilis
- Spirulina innatans
- Spirulina labyrinthiformis
- Spirulina laxa
- Spirulina laxissima
- Spirulina legitima
- Spirulina magnifica
- Spirulina major
- Spirulina margaritae
- Spirulina mariae
- Spirulina massartii
- Spirulina maxima
- Spirulina miniata
- Spirulina minima
- Spirulina mukdensis
- Spirulina nodosa
- Spirulina nordstedtii
- Spirulina okensis
- Spirulina oscillarioides
- Spirulina platensis
- Spirulina princeps
- Spirulina pseudotenuissima
- Spirulina robusta
- Spirulina rosea
- Spirulina schroederi
- Spirulina sigmoidea
- Spirulina socialis
- Spirulina spirulinoides
- Spirulina subsalsa
- Spirulina subtilissima
- Spirulina supersalsa
- Spirulina tenerrima
- Spirulina tenuior
- Spirulina tenuis
- Spirulina tenuissima
- Spirulina thermalis
- Spirulina turfosa
- Spirulina versicolor
- Spirulina weissii
- Spirulina spp

== See also ==
- Arthrospira
