= Spirulina albida =

Scientific classification
- Domain: Bacteria
- Phylum: Cyanobacteria
- Class: Cyanophyceae
- Order: Spirulinales
- Family: Spirulinaceae
- Genus: Spirulina
- Species: S. albida

Binomial name
- Spirulina albida Kolkwitz 1909

Species of bacterium

Spirulina albida is a chlorophyll-free, heterotrophic and saprotrophic freshwater cyanobacterium from the genus Spirulina. "Spirulina albida" occur in surface films.
