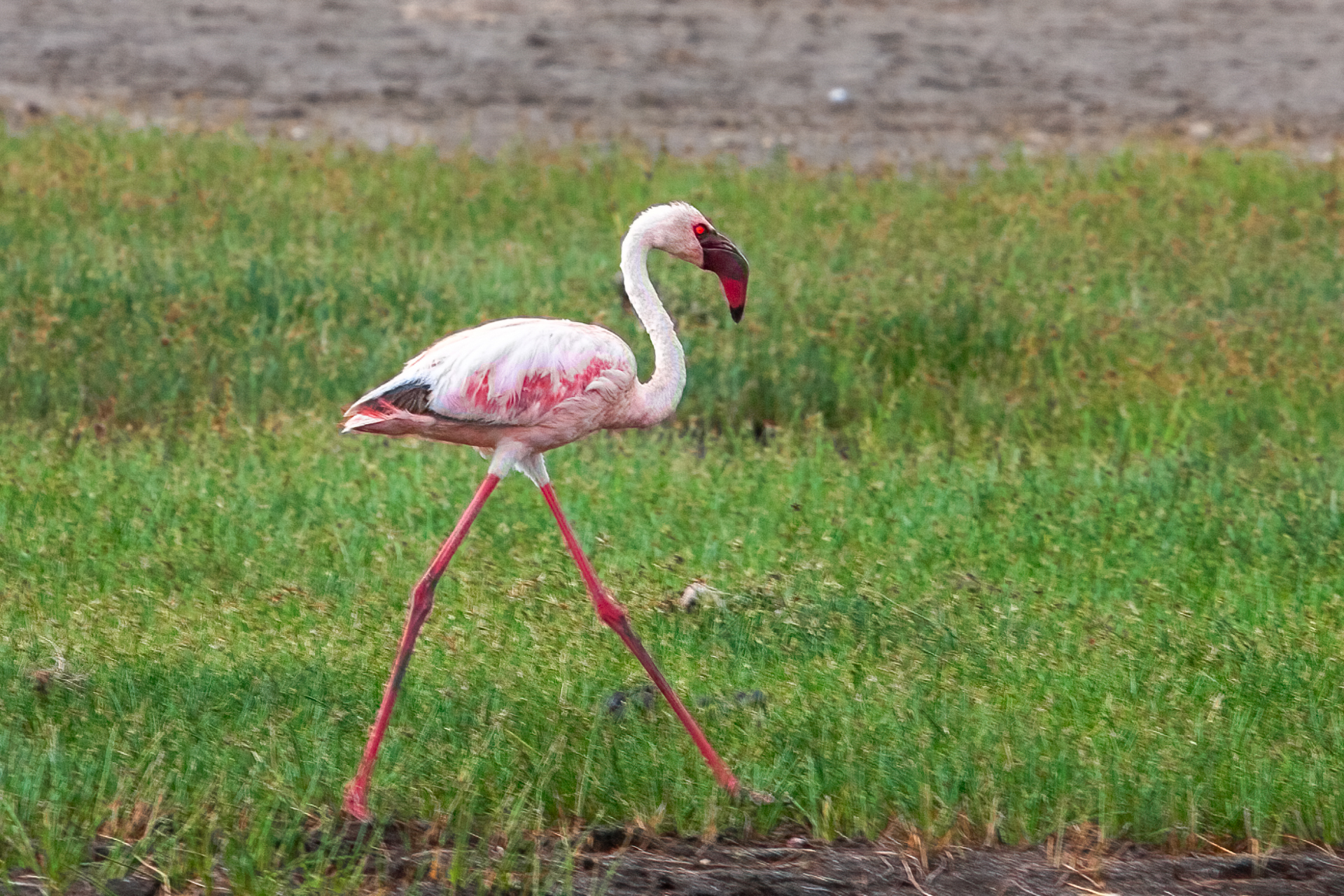
- At Lake Nakuru, Kenya

Scientific classification
- Kingdom: Animalia
- Phylum: Chordata
- Class: Aves
- Order: Phoenicopteriformes
- Family: Phoenicopteridae
- Genus: Phoeniconaias; G.R. Gray, 1869

Type species
- Phoenicopterus minor (É. Geoffroy Saint-Hilaire, 1798)

= Phoeniconaias =

Genus of birds

Phoeniconaias is a genus of birds in the flamingo family Phoenicopteridae. The genus contains one extant species, the lesser flamingo (Phoeniconaias minor), occurring in sub-Saharan Africa and western India, and an extinct species, Phoeniconaias proeses, from the Pliocene of Australia, which is thought to have been even smaller.
