= Chenghai Lake =

Lake in Yunnan province, China

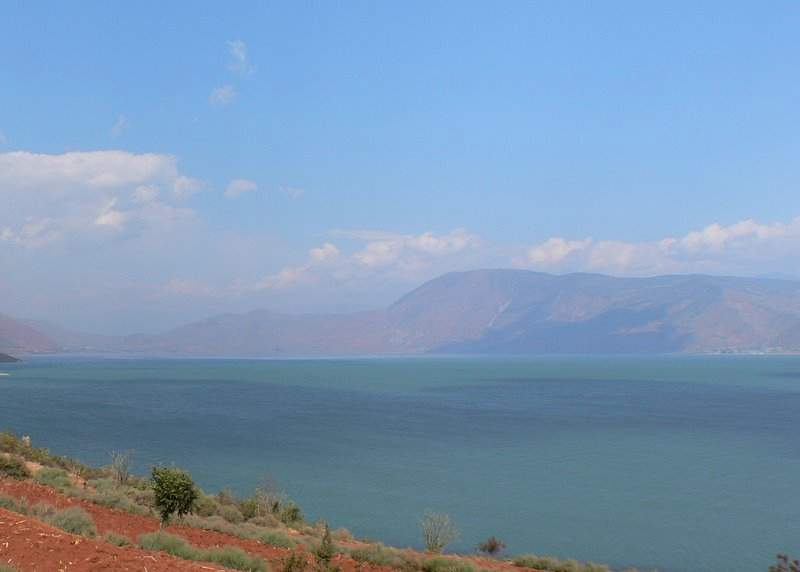

- Location within Yunnan
- Location: Chenghai Town, Yongsheng County, Yunnan
- Coordinates: 26°32′52″N 100°39′38″E
- Catchment area: 228.9 km^{2} (88.4 sq mi)
- Basin countries: China
- Max. length: 19.35 km (12 mi)
- Max. width: 5.3 km (3 mi)
- Surface area: 77.22 km^{2} (0 sq mi)
- Average depth: 25.7 m (84 ft)
- Max. depth: 35.1 m (115 ft)
- Water volume: 1.987 billion cubic metres (70.2×10^{9} cu ft)
- Surface elevation: 1,503 m (4,931 ft)

Chenghai Lake (Chinese: 程海; pinyin: Chénghaǐ) is a mesotrophic plateau lake in Yunnan Province, China. The lake has a total area of about 77.22 square kilometres (29.81 sq mi). The average depth is 25.7 metres (84 ft), with an elevation of 1,503 metres (4,931 ft). the water storage capacity is about 19.87×10^{8}m^{3} (i.e about 2 billion m^{3} or 2 km^{3}). Chenghai Lake is one of only three lakes in the world where Spirulina is found naturally.

== Ecology ==
Chenghai Lake is known to have significant yeast biodiversity; a study collected and identified 64 yeast strains, in 22 species across 8 genera. The lake is a closed ecosystem, and is mesotrophic, meaning it supports an intermediate level of biological productivity. Aquatic vegetation in the lake has declined, probably due to pollution, habitat destruction, eutrophication, and effects of grass carp stocks.

== Pollution ==
Caesium-137, a radioactive fallout isotope, is present in the lake.
