= Arthrospira ardissonei =

Scientific classification
- Domain: Bacteria
- Kingdom: Bacillati
- Phylum: Cyanobacteriota
- Class: Cyanophyceae
- Order: Oscillatoriales
- Family: Microcoleaceae
- Genus: Arthrospira
- Species: A. ardissonei

Binomial name
- Arthrospira ardissonei Forti, 1907

Synonyms
- Spirulina ardissoni Cohn ex Rabenhorst, 1865

Species of bacterium

Arthrospira ardissoni is a cyanobacteria from the family Microcoleaceae.
