= Collaborative Inter-Governmental Scientific Research Institute =

International organization based in Italy

The Collaborative Inter-Governmental Scientific Research Institute (CISRI) is an international organization based in Rome and Novara, Italy, and established by the Free Agreement for co-operation in scientific research and humanitarian use of micro-alga spirulina as food.

== Constitution and legal status ==
Free Agreement for cooperation in scientific research and humanitarian use of micro-alga spirulina as food
- Signed: 20 November 2000; 24 August 2000
- Location: Conakry, Guinea; Kinshasa, DR Congo
- Effective: 20 November 2000
- Condition: Ratification by 2 states
- Signatories: 2
- Parties: 4: Democratic Republic of the Congo; Equatorial Guinea; Guinea; Benin; Burundi; Gambia; Honduras; São Tomé and Príncipe
- Depositary: Collaborative Inter-Governmental Scientific Research Institute Secretary-General
- Languages: English, French and Spanish

CISRI, a multilateral treaty, was established by the Free Agreement for co-operation in scientific research and humanitarian use of micro-alga spirulina as food. Parties involved in the agreement are the Democratic Republic of the Congo and Guinea with subsequent accessions by Equatorial Guinea, São Tomé and Príncipe, Benin, Burundi, Gambia and Honduras. Although Italy's ratification was recorded, Italy declared in 2009 to the United Nations, that it "respectfully requests to be erased from the Annexes to Documents which have Registration Numbers 37543 and 37542"

According to the agreement, the organization has 3 organs:

- General Council
- Secretariat
- Intergovernmental Institution for the Use of Micro-alga Spirulina (Spirulina Program) as affiliated body

CISRI focuses on international cooperation with relevant United Nations General Assembly Resolutions on international cooperation, social development, as well as food and water improvement.

== Activities ==
CISRI focuses on development activities, beginning with the microalga Spirulina, which has been indicated as a nutritious food source.
