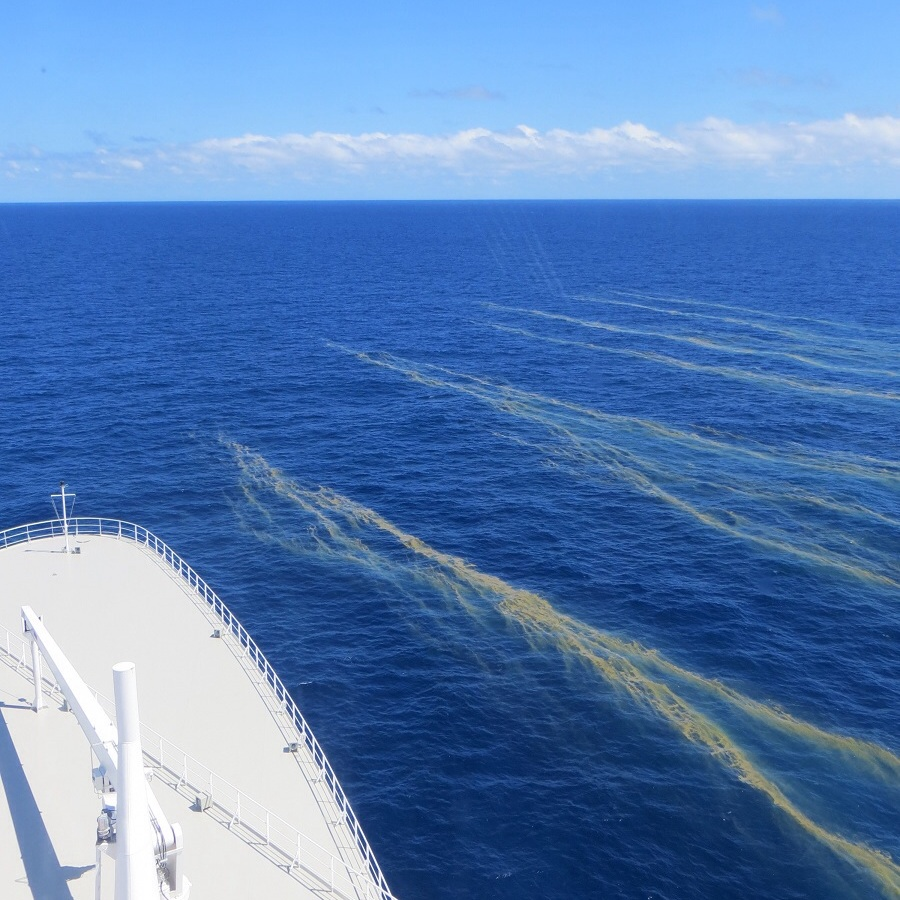
- Trichodesmium bloom off the Great Barrier Reef

Scientific classification
- Domain: Bacteria
- Kingdom: Bacillati
- Phylum: Cyanobacteriota
- Class: Cyanophyceae
- Order: Oscillatoriales
- Family: Microcoleaceae
- Genus: Trichodesmium; Ehrenberg ex Gomont, 1892

= Trichodesmium =

Genus of bacteria

Trichodesmium, also called sea sawdust, is a genus of filamentous cyanobacteria. They are found in nutrient poor tropical and subtropical ocean waters (particularly around Australia and in the Red Sea, where they were first described by Captain Cook). Trichodesmium is a diazotroph; that is, it fixes atmospheric nitrogen into ammonium, a nutrient used by other organisms. Trichodesmium is thought to fix nitrogen on such a scale that it accounts for almost half of the nitrogen fixation in marine systems globally. Trichodesmium is the only known diazotroph able to fix nitrogen in daylight under aerobic conditions without the use of heterocysts.

Trichodesmium can live as individual filaments, with tens to hundreds of cells strung together, or in colonies consisting of tens to hundreds of filaments clustered together. These colonies are visible to the naked eye and sometimes form blooms, which can be extensive on surface waters. These large blooms led to widespread recognition as "sea sawdust/straw". The Red Sea gets most of its eponymous colouration from the corresponding pigment in Trichodesmium erythraeum. Colonies of Trichodesmium provide a pseudobenthic substrate for many small oceanic organisms including bacteria, diatoms, dinoflagellates, protozoa, and copepods (which are its primary predator); in this way, the genus can support complex microenvironments.

== Species ==
There are currently 9 accepted species in the genus Trichodesmium:

- Trichodesmium clevei (J.Schmidt) Anagnostidis & Komárek
- Trichodesmium contortum (Wille ex O.Kirchner ) Wille
- Trichodesmium erythraeum Ehrenberg ex Gomont
- Trichodesmium hildebrantii Gomont
- Trichodesmium iwanoffianum Nygaard
- Trichodesmium lacustre Klebahn
- Trichodesmium lenticulare (Lemmermann) Anagnostidis & Komárek
- Trichodesmium scoboideum A.H.S.Lucas
- Trichodesmium thiebautii Gomont

Trichodesmium erythraeum, described by Ehrenberg in 1830, is the lectotype of the genus. T. erythraeum is the species responsible for discoloring the Red Sea during blooms. This is the only sequenced genome in the genus thus far and is the focus of most laboratory studies (Trichodesmium IMS 101).

== Cell structure ==
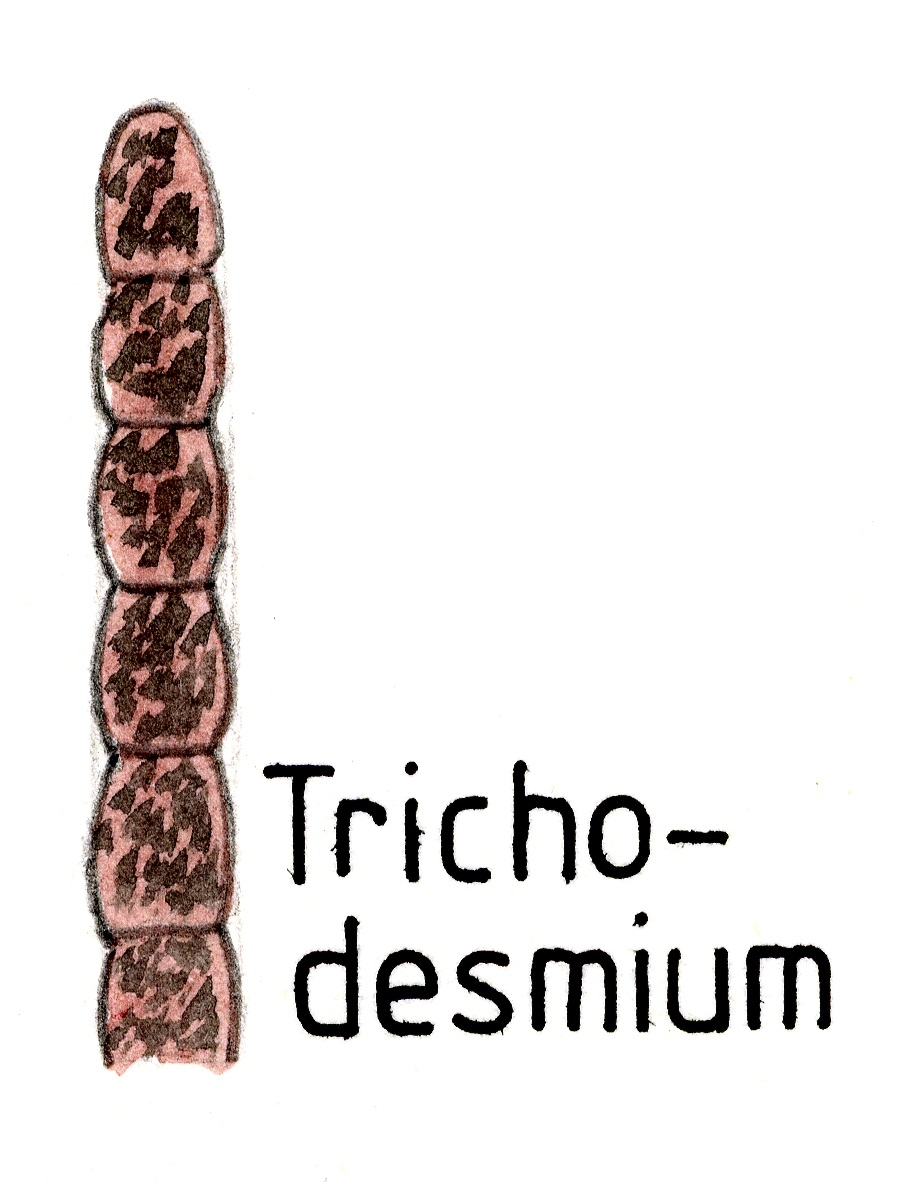
Illustration

Like most cyanobacteria, Trichodesmium has a gram negative cell wall. Unlike other diazotrophic, filamentous cyanobacteria, Trichodesmium do not have heterocysts—structures found in some filamentous, nitrogen-fixing cyanobacteria which protect the enzyme nitrogenase from oxygen. This is a unique characteristic among filamentous cyanobacteria which fix nitrogen in daylight. Photosynthesis occurs using phycoerythrin – light-harvesting phycobiliprotein which is normally found within heterocysts in other diazotrophs.

Instead of having localized stacks of thylakoids, Trichodesmium has unstacked thylakoids found throughout the cell. Trichodesmium is highly vacuolated and the content and size of the vacuoles shows diurnal variation. Large gas vesicles (either along the periphery as seen in T. erythaeum or found distributed throughout the cell as seen in T. thiebautii) allow Trichodesmium to regulate buoyancy in the water column. These gas vesicles can withstand high pressure, presumably those up to 100–200 m in the water column, allowing Trichodesmium to move vertically through the water column harvesting nutrients.

== Nitrogen fixation ==
N_{2} is the most abundant chemical in the atmosphere. However, diatomic nitrogen is not usable for most biological processes. Nitrogen fixation is the process of converting atmospheric diatomic nitrogen into biologically usable forms of nitrogen such as ammonium and nitrogen oxides. This process requires a substantial amount of energy (in the form of ATP) in order to break the triple bond between the nitrogen atoms.

Trichodesmium is the major diazotroph in marine pelagic systems and is an important source of "new" nitrogen in the nutrient poor waters it inhabits. It has been estimated that the global input of nitrogen fixation by Trichodesmium is approximately 60–80 Tg (megatonnes or 10^{12} grams) N per year. Nitrogen fixation in Trichodesmium is unique among diazotrophs because the process occurs concurrently with oxygen production (via photosynthesis). In other cyanobacteria, N_{2} and CO_{2} reduction are separated either in space (using heterocysts to protect the sensitive nitrogenase enzyme from oxygen) or time. However, Trichodesmium lacks heterocysts and nitrogen fixation peaks during daylight hours (following a diel flux initiated in the morning, reaching a maximum fixation rate midday, and ceasing activity at night). Since the first realization of this enigma, Trichodesmium has been the focus of many studies to try and discover how nitrogen fixation is able to occur in the presence of oxygen production without any apparent structure separating the two processes.

Inhibitor studies even revealed that photosystem II activity is essential for nitrogen fixation in this organism. All this may seem contradictory at first glance, because the enzyme responsible for nitrogen fixation, nitrogenase, is irreversibly inhibited by oxygen. However, Trichodesmium utilises photosynthesis for nitrogen fixation by carrying out the Mehler reaction, during which the oxygen produced by PSII is reduced again after PSI. This regulation of photosynthesis for nitrogen fixation involves rapidly reversible coupling of their light-harvesting antenna, the phycobilisomes, with PSI and PSII.

== Ecology ==
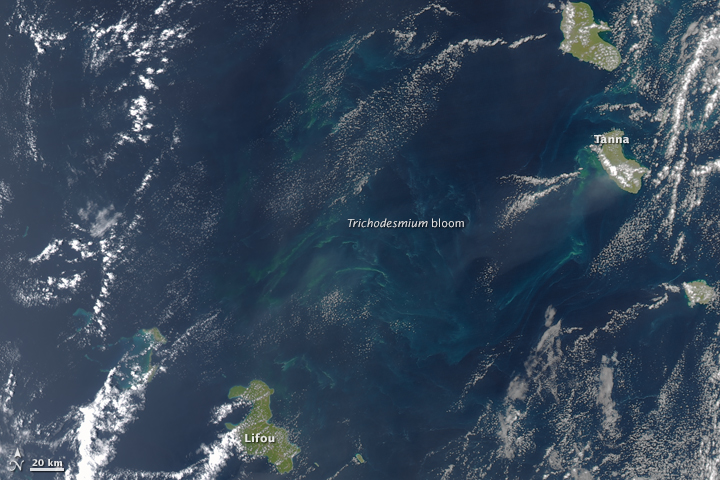
Trichodesmium erythraeum bloom, between Vanuatu and New Caledonia, SW Pacific Ocean.

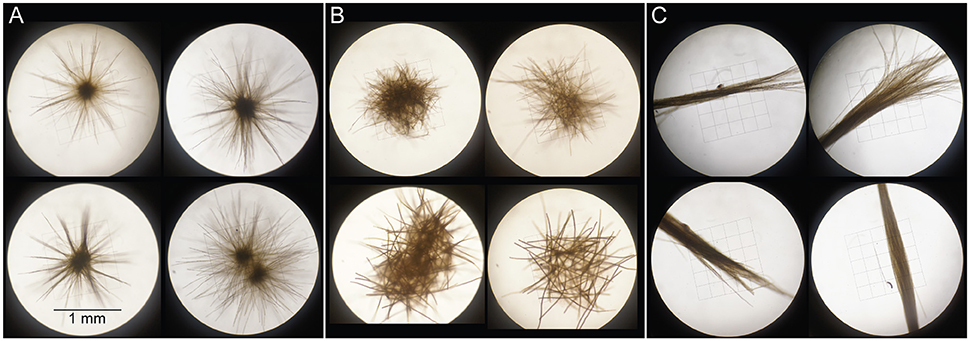
Examples of Trichodesmium colonies sorted into morphological classes (A) radial puffs, (B) non-radial puffs, (C) tufts.

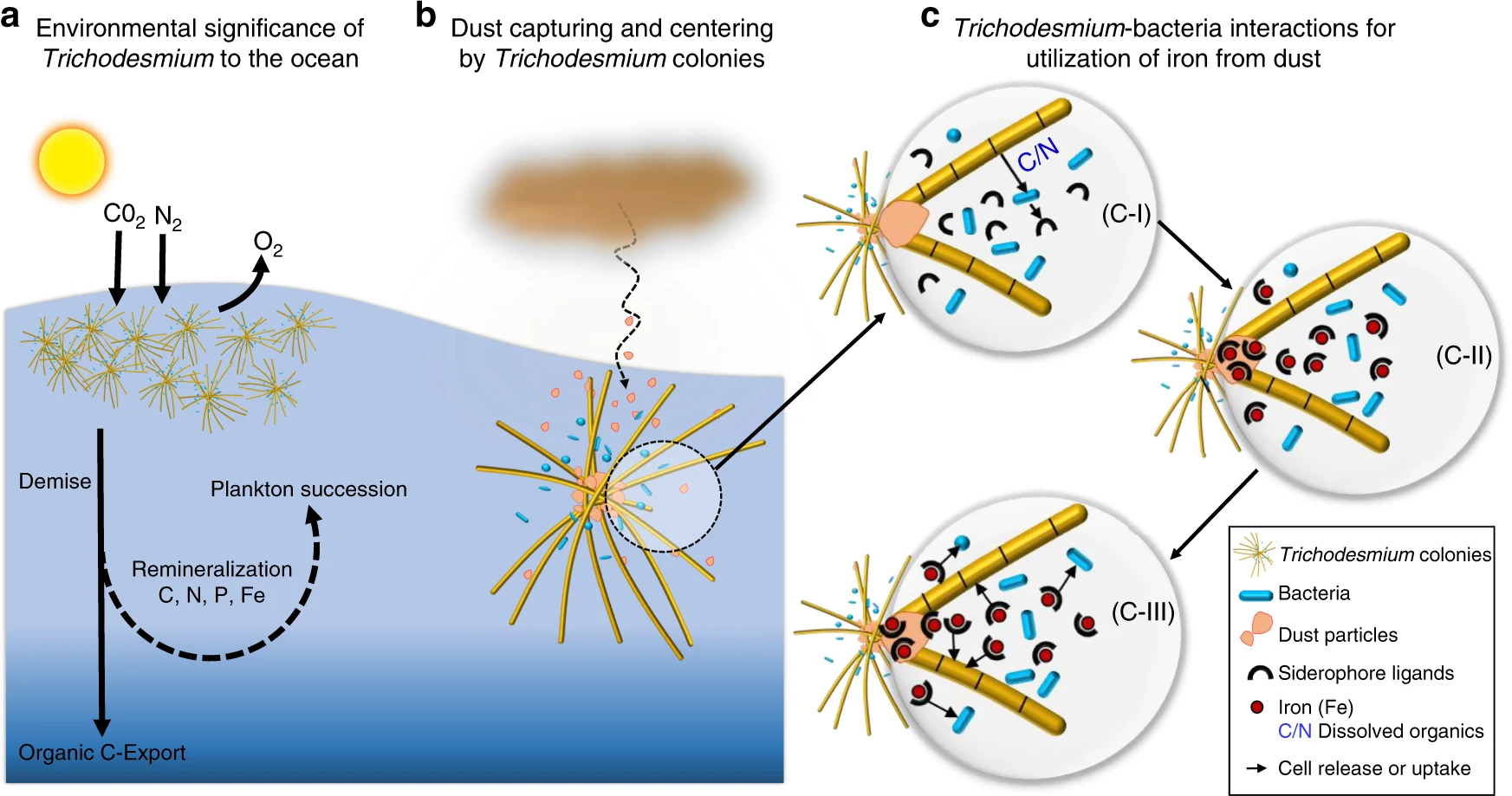
Colonies of marine cyanobacteria Trichodesmium interact with other bacteria to acquire iron from dust a. The N_{2}-fixing Trichodesmium spp., which commonly occurs in tropical and sub-tropical waters, is of large environmental significance in fertilizing the ocean with important nutrients. b. Trichodesmium can establish massive blooms in nutrient poor ocean regions with high dust deposition, partly due to their unique ability to capture dust, center it, and subsequently dissolve it. c. Proposed dust-bound Fe acquisition pathway: Bacteria residing within the colonies produce siderophores (C-I) that react with the dust particles in the colony core and generate dissolved Fe (C-II). This dissolved Fe, complexed by siderophores, is then acquired by both Trichodesmium and its resident bacteria (C-III), resulting in a mutual benefit to both partners of the consortium.

Trichodesmium is found in oligotrophic waters, often when waters are calm and the mixed layer depth is shallow (around 100 m). Trichodesmium is found primarily in water between 20 and 34 °C and is frequently encountered in tropical and sub-tropical oceans in western boundary currents. Its presence is more pronounced in nitrogen poor water and can easily be seen when blooms form, trapping large Trichodesmium colonies at the surface.

As a diazotroph, Trichodesmium contributes a large portion of the marine ecosystem's new nitrogen, estimated to produce between 60 and 80 Tg of nitrogen per year. Nitrogen fixed by Trichodesmium can either be used directly by the cell, enter the food chain through grazers, be released into dissolved pools, or get exported to the deep sea.

Compared to eukaryotic phytoplankton, Trichodesmium has a slow growth rate, which has been hypothesized to be an adaptation to survival in high energy but low nutrient conditions of oligotrophic waters. Growth rate is limited by iron and phosphate concentrations in the water. In order to obtain these limiting nutrients, Trichodesmium is able to regulate buoyancy using its gas vacuole and move vertically throughout the water column, harvesting nutrients.

=== Colonies ===
Various species of Trichodesmium have been described based on morphology and structure of colonies formed. Colonies may consist of aggregates of several to several hundred trichomes and form fusiform (called "Tufts") colonies when aligned in parallel, or spherical (called "Puffs") colonies when aligned radially.

Trichodesmium colonies have been shown to have large degree of associations with other organisms, including bacteria, fungi, diatoms, copepods, tunicates, hydrozoans, and protozoans among other groups. These colonies may provide a source of shelter, buoyancy, and possibly food in the surface waters. Most of these associations appear to be commensal, with the Trichodesmium providing substrate and nutrition while deriving no obvious benefit from the organisms dwelling within the colonies.

=== Sociality ===
Trichodesmium are able to transfer between living as a single filament and as a colony. These different morphologies impact the way that the Trichodesmium interact with the environment. Switching between morphologies shows that there are different benefits and costs of existing in each form, and helps scientists understand why transferring from one form to another is necessary. Trichomes, or free-floating single filaments, have higher rates of nitrogen fixation as opposed to colonies. When iron and phosphorus are limiting in the environment, the filamentous Trichodesmium are stimulated to aggregate together to form colonies. Colonies can outcompete trichomes when environmental factors such as predation and rate of respiration for nutrient fixing are at play. The size of the colonies are also linked with the environmental oxygen content, due to the influence of oxygen in the process of photosynthesis.

Trichodesmium colonies are microbially diverse and are considered to be a holobiont, where multiple epibiont bacteria form a singular colony. In these holobionts, Trichodesmium is the core host, but the microbial diversity of the holobiont colony is an essential part of its ecological interactions. Some examples of the Trichodesmium microbiome’s epibiont bacteria include diazotrophs and several cyanobacteria species such as Richelia. Trichodesmium and the epibiont bacteria within the holobiont colonies may perform mutualistic interactions where limiting nutrients such as iron can be mobilized from dust. Other interactions with organisms arise when trichomes start to accumulate together. When colonies of Trichodesmium aggregate in large numbers, it is possible for them to produce a phycotoxin that can affect the growth other microorganisms in the local space of the ocean.

=== Blooms ===
Trichodesmium forms large, visible blooms in the surface waters. Blooms have been described in the Baltic Sea, the Red Sea, the Caribbean Sea, the Indian Ocean, the North and South Atlantic and the North Pacific, and off the coast of Australia. One of the earliest blooms was described by E. Dupont in the Red Sea, noticed for turning the surface of the water a reddish color. This bloom was said to extend about 256 nautical miles. Most blooms are several kilometers long and last one to several months. Blooms can form in coastal or oceanic waters, most frequently when the water has been still for some time and surface temperatures exceed 27 °C.

Trichodesmium blooms release carbon, nitrogen and other nutrients into the environment. Some species of Trichodesmium have been shown to release toxins which cause mortalities in some copepods, fish, and oysters. Blooms have also been credited with releasing the toxin which causes clupeotoxism in humans after ingesting fish which have bioaccumulated the toxin during Trichodesmium blooms. The larger impact of these blooms is likely important to the oceanic ecosystem and is the source of many studies. Blooms are traced and tracked using satellite imaging where the highly reflective gas vacuole makes Trichodesmium blooms easily detectable.

It is expected that blooms may increase due to anthropogenic effects in the coming years. Phosphate loading of the environment (through fertilizer pollution, waste disposal, and mariculture) will reduce the growth constraints associated with limited phosphate and likely increase bloom occurrences. Likewise, global warming is projected to increase stratification and cause a shallowing of the mixed layer depth. Both of these factors are associated with Trichodesmium blooms and may also cause an increase in the occurrence of blooms in the future.

== Bibliography ==
- Kana, T.M. (1993) Rapid oxygen cycling in Trichodesmium thiebautii. Limnology and Oceanography 38: 18–24.
- Berman-Frank, I., Lundgren, P., Chen, Y.-B., Küpper, H., Kolber, Z., Bergman, B., and Falkowski, P. (2001) Segregation of nitrogen fixation and oxygenic photosynthesis in the marine cyanobacterium Trichodesmium. Science 294: 1534–1537.
- Küpper, H., Ferimazova, N., Šetlík, I., and Berman-Frank, I. (2004) Traffic lights in Trichodesmium: regulation of photosynthesis for nitrogen fixation studied by chlorophyll fluorescence kinetic microscopy. Plant Physiology 135: 2120–2133.
