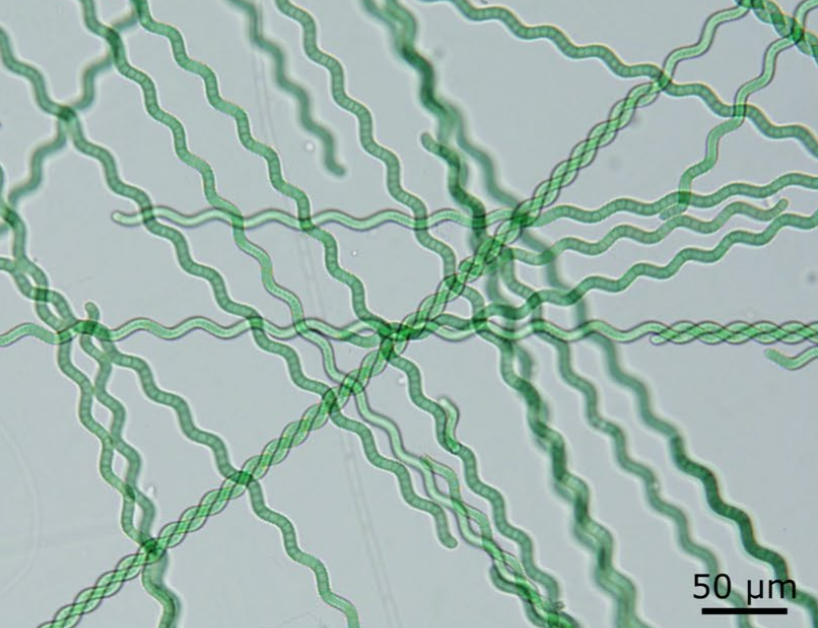
- Several colonies (trichomes) of Arthrospira jenneri

Scientific classification
- Domain: Bacteria
- Kingdom: Bacillati
- Phylum: Cyanobacteriota
- Class: Cyanophyceae
- Order: Oscillatoriales
- Family: Microcoleaceae
- Genus: Arthrospira; Stizenberger ex Gomont, 1892

Type species
- Arthrospira jenneri

Species
- Arthrospira jenneri; Dubious pending phylogenetic data: Arthrospira ardissonei; Arthrospira massartii; ... (25 total "correct names" on LPSN)

= Arthrospira =

Genus of Cyanobacteria

Arthrospira is a genus of free-floating filamentous cyanobacteria characterized by cylindrical, multicellular trichomes in an open left-hand helix. It was originally proposed in 1892 and went through a period of disuse between 1932 and 1974 due to an error perpetuated by Geitler. It contained the cultivated species used for producing spirulina until 2019, when it was found that the sequence of the type species A. jenneri was only distantly related to the cultivated species with several established genera in between, causing a new genus Limnospira to be created for them.

== Taxonomy ==
The taxonomic history of Arthrospira is deeply intertwined with the taxonomic history of Limnospira, which contains all cultivated species formerly considered Arthrospira. For details on these species consult Limnospira § Taxonomy.

=== Invalid names ===
The invalid name "A. erdosensis" (Tian et al., 2002) Qian et al., 2006 refers to a species that photogenically belongs in Limnospira.

The invalid name "A. pacifica" has been used to describe an algae found in Hawaii, also used for "spirulina" production through cultivation in raceway ponds. Although no sequence data is available, its use suggests that it is likely some form of Limnospira.

== Phylogeny ==
There are no fully sequenced genomes for Arthrospira. Existing sources generally use a single locus, usually 16S rRNA, ITS, or the phycocyanin operon cpcBA.

16S rRNA tree, trimmed to show important genera (1800 bp fragment from Nowicka-Krawczyk et al. 2019):

- - - - Arthospira jenneri
      - Planktothrix
    - - Microcoleus + Tychonema
      - Kamptonema
  - Hydrocoleum + Lyngbya + Oscillatoria sancta + Okeania
- - - - Sirenicapillariaceae
        - Limnospira
          - - L. maxima
            - L. platensis
          - "A. erdosensis"
        - - Limnoraphis
          - Neolyngbya
      - Planktothricoides
  - - Laspinema
    - Oxynema
