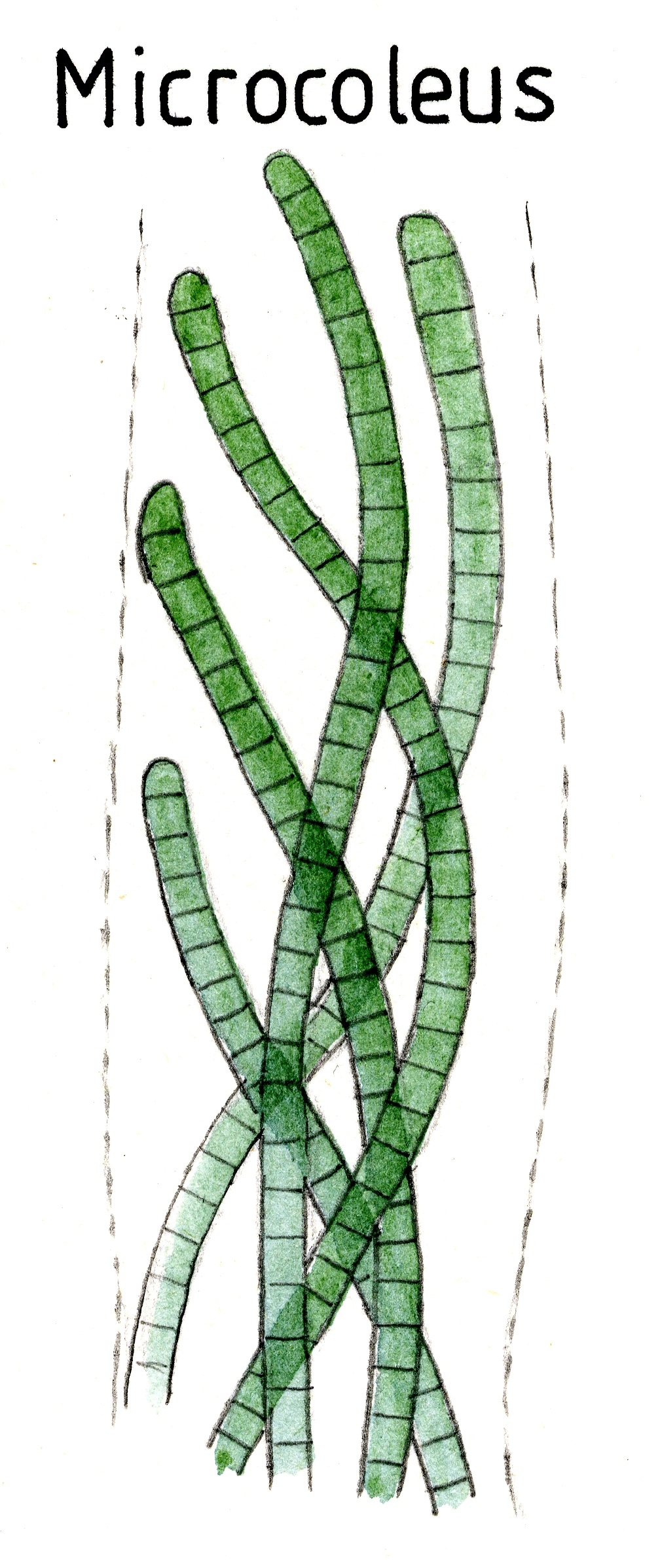

Scientific classification
- Domain: Bacteria
- Phylum: Cyanobacteria
- Class: Cyanophyceae
- Order: Oscillatoriales
- Family: Microcoleaceae; Komárek et al. 2014

Genera
- Affixifilum Lefler et al. 2021; Ammatoidea West and West 1897; Ancylothrix Martins and Branco 2016; Annamia Nguyen et al. 2013; Arthrospira Stizenberger ex Gomont 1892; Blennothrix Kützing ex Anagnostidis and Komárek 1988; Capilliphycus Caires et al. 2019; Dapis Engene et al. 2018; Dasygloea Thwaites ex Gomont 1892; Homoeothrix (Thuret ex Bornet and Flahault 1887) Kirchner 1898; Hydrocoleum Kützing ex Gomont 1892; Johanseninema Hašler et al. 2014; Kamptonema Strunecký et al. 2014; Kuetzingina Kuntze 1898; Leibleinia (Gomont 1890) Hoffmann 1985; Leptochromothrix Berthold et al. 2020; Limnoraphis Komárek et al. 2013; Limnospira Nowicka-Krawczyk et al. 2019; Lyngbya Agardh ex Gomont 1892; Lyngbyopsis Gardner 1927; Microcoleus Desmazičres ex Gomont 1892; Microcoleusiopsis Geng and Yu 2021; Nemacola Massalongo 1855; Neolyngbya Caires et al. 2018; Okeania Engene et al. 2013; Ophiophycus Berthold et al. 2020; Oxynema Chatchawan et al. 2012; Phormidiochaete Komárek 2001; Planktothricoides Suda & M. M. Watanabe 2002; Planktothrix Anagnostidis & Komárek 1988; Plectonema Thuret ex Gomont 1892; Polychlamydum West and West 1897; Porphyrosiphon Kützing ex Gomont 1892; Proterendothrix W. & G.S.West 1897; Pseudophormidium (Forti) Anagnostidis & Komárek 1988; Pseudoscytonema Elenkin 1949; Sirenicapillaria Berthold et al. 2022; Sirocoleum Kützing ex Gomont 1892; Symploca Kützing ex Gomont 1892; Symplocastrum (Gomont) Kirchner 1898; Tenebriella Hauerová et al. 2021; Tigrinifilum Berthold et al. 2022; Trichodesmium Ehrenberg ex Gomont 1892; Tychonema Anagnostidis & Komárek 1988; Vaginaria Gray ex Kuntze 1898; Vermifilum Berthold et al. 2020

= Microcoleaceae =

Family of bacteria

The Microcoleaceae are a family of cyanobacteria.
