= Kamptonema =

Scientific classification
- Domain: Bacteria
- Phylum: Cyanobacteria
- Class: Cyanophyceae
- Order: Oscillatoriales
- Family: Microcoleaceae
- Genus: Kamptonema; O.Strunecký, J.Komárek & J.Smarda

Genus of cyanobacteria

Kamptonema is a genus of cyanobacteria belonging to the family Microcoleaceae.

The genus was first described by O. Strunecký, J. Komárek and J. Smarda in 2014.

Species:

- Kamptonema chlorinum (Kützing ex Gomont) Strunecký, Komárek & J.Smarda, 2014
- Kamptonema proteus
