= Spirulina (dietary supplement) =

Blue-green algal genus used in food

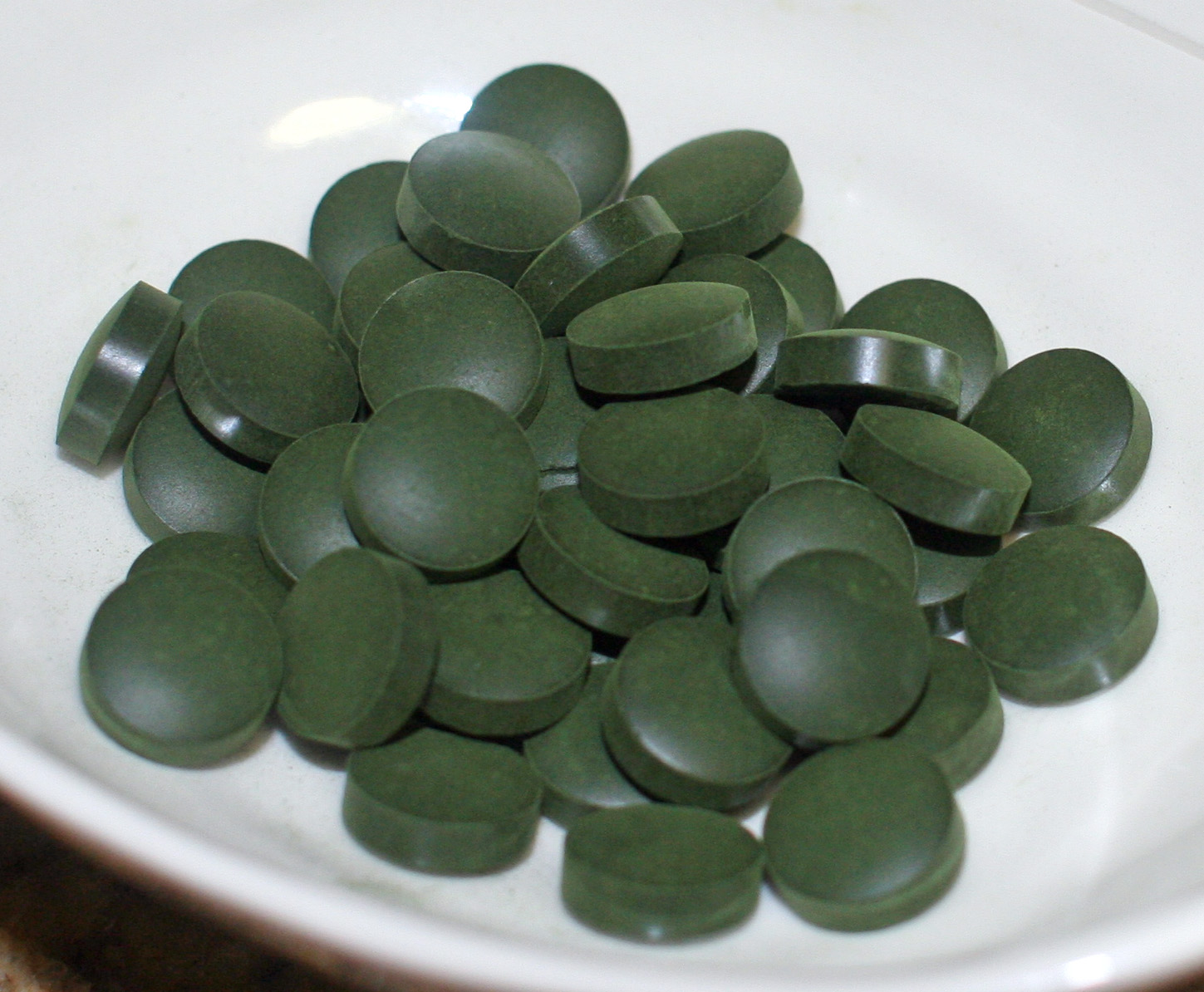
Spirulina tablets

Spirulina is the dried biomass of cyanobacteria (blue-green algae) that can be consumed by humans and animals. The three species are Arthrospira platensis, A. fusiformis, and A. maxima. Recent research has further moved all these species to Limnospira. L. fusiformis is also found to be insufficiently different from L. maxima to be its own species. The genus Arthrospira was formerly classified in the genus Spirulina, hence the name.

Cultivated worldwide, spirulina is used as a dietary supplement or whole food. It is also used as a feed supplement in the aquaculture, aquarium, and poultry industries. It is assigned E/INS number E134, although it is not explicitly approved as a food additive in Europe. It is approved by the FDA in the US as a food additive.

== Biological nature ==
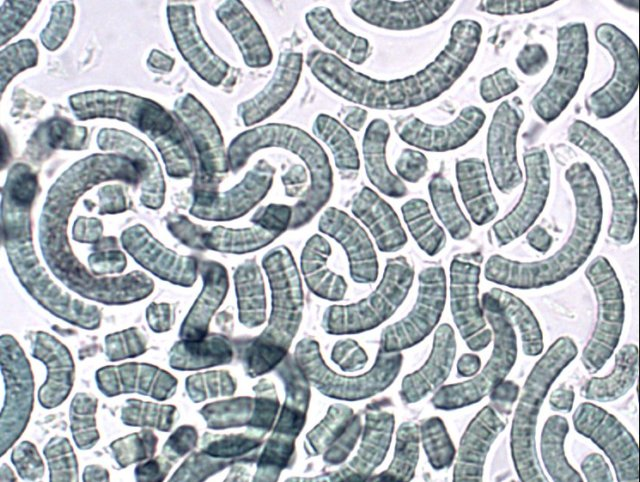
Spirulina powder at 400×, unstained wet mount

Arthrospira species are free-floating, filamentous cyanobacteria characterized by cylindrical, multicellular trichomes in an open left-handed helix. They occur naturally in tropical and subtropical lakes with high pH and high concentrations of carbonate and bicarbonate. A. platensis occurs in Africa, Asia, and South America, whereas A. maxima is confined to Central America. Most cultivated spirulina is produced in open-channel raceway ponds, with paddle wheels used to agitate the water.

Spirulina thrives at a pH around 8.5 and above and a temperature around 30 °C (86 °F). They are autotrophic, and do not need a living energy or organic carbon source.

=== Taxonomy ===
The species A. maxima and A. platensis were once classified in the genus Spirulina. The common name, spirulina, refers to the dried biomass of A. platensis, which belongs to photosynthetic bacteria that cover the groups Cyanobacteria and Prochlorophyta. Scientifically, a distinction exists between spirulina and the genus Arthrospira, for which the two species were originally proposed. Species of Arthrospira have been isolated from alkaline brackish and saline waters in tropical and subtropical regions. Among the various species included in the genus Arthrospira, A. platensis is the most widely distributed and is mainly found in Africa, but also in Asia. The term "spirulina" (without italicizing and usually without capitalization) remains in use for historical reasons.

In 2019 it was found that the cultivated species differ too much from the type species of Arthospira to be in the genus, necessitating another batch of renaming to Limnospira to reflect biological reality.

== Historical use ==
Spirulina was a food source for the Aztecs and other Mesoamericans until the 16th century; the harvest from Lake Texcoco in Mexico and subsequent sale as cakes were described by one of Cortés' soldiers. The Aztecs called it tecuitlatl.

Spirulina was found in abundance at Lake Texcoco by French researchers in the 1960s, but no reference to its use by the Aztecs as a daily food source was made after the 16th century, probably because of the draining of the surrounding lakes for agriculture and urban development. The topic of tecuitlatl, which was discovered in 1520, was not mentioned again until 1940, when the Belgian phycologist Pierre Dangeard mentioned a cake called dihe consumed by the Kanembu people, who harvest it from Lake Chad in the African nation of Chad. Dangeard studied the dihe samples and found it to be a dried purée of the spring form of the blue-green algae from the lake. The dihe is used to make broths for meals, and also sold in markets. The spirulina is harvested from small lakes and ponds around Lake Chad.

During 1964 and 1965, the botanist Jean Leonard confirmed that dihe is made up of spirulina, and later studied a bloom of algae in a sodium hydroxide production facility. As a result, the first systematic and detailed study of the growth requirements and physiology of spirulina was performed as a basis for establishing large-scale production in the 1970s.

== Nutrition ==
Spirulina (dried)
Nutritional value per 100 g (3.5 oz)
- Energy: 1,213 kJ (290 kcal)
- Carbohydrates: 23.9 g
- Sugars: 3.1 g
- Dietary fiber: 3.6 g
- Fat: 7.72 g
- Saturated: 2.65 g
- Monounsaturated: 0.675 g
- Polyunsaturated: 2.08 g
- Protein: 57.47 g
Amino acids
| Tryptophan | 0.929 g |
| Threonine | 2.97 g |
| Isoleucine | 3.209 g |
| Leucine | 4.947 g |
| Lysine | 3.025 g |
| Methionine | 1.149 g |
| Cystine | 0.662 g |
| Phenylalanine | 2.777 g |
| Tyrosine | 2.584 g |
| Valine | 3.512 g |
| Arginine | 4.147 g |
| Histidine | 1.085 g |
| Alanine | 4.515 g |
| Aspartic acid | 5.793 g |
| Glutamic acid | 8.386 g |
| Glycine | 3.099 g |
| Proline | 2.382 g |
| Serine | 2.998 g |
Vitamins and minerals
| Vitamins | Quantity %DV^{†} |
| Vitamin A equiv. | 3% 27 μg |
| Thiamine (B1) | 198% 2.38 mg |
| Riboflavin (B2) | 282% 3.67 mg |
| Niacin (B3) | 80% 12.82 mg |
| Pantothenic acid (B5) | 70% 3.48 mg |
| Vitamin B6 | 21% 0.364 mg |
| Folate (B9) | 24% 94 μg |
| Vitamin B12 | 0% 0 μg |
| Choline | 12% 66 mg |
| Vitamin C | 11% 10.1 mg |
| Vitamin D | 0% 0 IU |
| Vitamin E | 33% 5 mg |
| Vitamin K | 21% 25.5 μg |
| Minerals | Quantity %DV^{†} |
| Calcium | 9% 120 mg |
| Iron | 158% 28.5 mg |
| Magnesium | 46% 195 mg |
| Manganese | 83% 1.9 mg |
| Phosphorus | 9% 118 mg |
| Potassium | 45% 1363 mg |
| Sodium | 46% 1048 mg |
| Zinc | 18% 2 mg |
- Other constituents: Quantity
- Water: 4.68 g
- Link to USDA FoodData Central
- ^{†}Percentages estimated using US recommendations for adults, except for potassium, which is estimated based on expert recommendation from the National Academies.

Dried spirulina is 5% water, 24% carbohydrates, 8% fat, and 57% protein (table). In a reference amount of 100 g (3.5 oz), dried spirulina powder supplies 290 kilocalories (1,200 kJ) and is a rich source (20% or more of the Daily Value, DV) of numerous essential nutrients, particularly B vitamins (thiamin, riboflavin, and niacin), and dietary minerals, such as iron and manganese (table).

The lipid content of spirulina is about 8% by weight. The polyunsaturated fatty acids include gamma-linolenic acid and linoleic acid. In contrast to the "high" content reported in a 2003 study, two other analyses found low levels of omega-3 fatty acids in spirulina.

=== Vitamin B_{12} ===
Spirulina contains no vitamin B_{12} naturally, and spirulina supplements are not considered a reliable source of vitamin B_{12}, as they contain predominantly pseudovitamin B_{12} (Coα-[α-(7-adenyl)]-Coβ-cyanocobamide), which is biologically inactive in humans. In a 2009 position paper on vegetarian diets, the American Dietetic Association stated that spirulina is not a reliable source of active vitamin B_{12}. The medical literature similarly advises that spirulina is unsuitable as a source of B_{12}.

=== Animals and aquaculture ===
Various studies on spirulina as an alternative feed for animal and aquaculture have been done. Spirulina can be fed up to 10% for poultry and less than 4% for quail. An increase in spirulina content up to 40 g/kg (0.64 oz/lb) for 16 days in 21-day-old broiler male chicks resulted in yellow and red coloration of flesh, possibly due to the accumulation of the yellow pigment zeaxanthin. Pigs and rabbits can receive up to 10% of the feed and increase in the spirulina content in cattle resulted in increase in milk yield and weight. Spirulina has been established as an alternative feedstock and immune booster for bigmouth buffalo, milk fish, cultured striped jack, carp, red sea bream, tilapia, catfish, yellow tail, zebrafish, shrimp, and abalone, and up to 2% spirulina per day in aquaculture feed can be safely recommended.

== Research ==
According to the U.S. National Institutes of Health, scientific evidence is insufficient to recommend spirulina supplementation for any human condition, and more research is needed to clarify whether consumption yields any benefits. Administration of spirulina has been investigated as a way to control glucose in people with diabetes, but the European Food Safety Authority rejected those claims in 2013. Spirulina has been studied as a potential nutritional supplement for adults and children affected by HIV, but there was no conclusive effect on risk of death, body weight, or immune response.

Spirulina was investigated to address food security and malnutrition, and as dietary support in long-term space flight or Mars missions.

== Risks ==
Spirulina may have adverse interactions when taken with prescription drugs, particularly those affecting the immune system and blood clotting.

=== Safety and toxicology ===
A number of cyanobacteria, of which spirulina is one, produce toxins such as microcystins. Some spirulina supplements have been found to be contaminated with microcystins, albeit at levels below the limit set by the Oregon Health Department. Microcystins can cause gastrointestinal upset, such as diarrhea, flatulence, headache, muscle pain, facial flushing, and sweating. Chronic exposure may lead to liver damage. The effects of chronic exposure to even low levels of microcystins are a concern due to the risk of toxicity to several organ systems.

These toxic compounds are not produced by spirulina itself, but can occur if spirulina batches are contaminated with other, toxin-producing, blue-green algae. Because spirulina products are marketed as a dietary supplement, such products are made to the standards of processing and chemical purity of the manufacturer. Accordingly, spirulina supplements are regarded only as "possibly safe", provided they are free of microcystin contamination, and "likely unsafe" (especially for children) if contaminated.

Public-health researchers have raised the concern that consumers cannot be certain that spirulina and other blue-green algae supplements are free of contamination. In 2016, a review by Health Canada of available literature found that spirulina products contained varying levels of microcystins. Health Canada restricts microcystin-LR levels in products containing cyanobacteria to 0.02 μg per kilogram of body weight per day in finished products, or a maximum of 1 part per million in raw materials.

Heavy-metal contamination of spirulina supplements has also raised concern. The Chinese State Food and Drug Administration reported that lead, mercury, and arsenic contamination was widespread in spirulina supplements marketed in China. One study reported the presence of lead up to 5.1 ppm in a sample from a commercial supplement. Spirulina doses of 10 to 19 grams per day over several months have been used safely.

=== Safety issues for certain target groups ===
Like all protein-rich foods, spirulina contains the essential amino acid phenylalanine (2.6–4.1 g/100 g), which should be avoided by people who have phenylketonuria, a rare genetic disorder that prevents the body from metabolizing phenylalanine.

Microcystins have various potential toxicity, especially to children and pregnant women, including liver damage, shock, and death.

In 2024, a literature review on the allergic properties of spirulina was published. It was noted that to date (by July 2023), there have been 5 cases of allergy to spirulina, with 4 out of 5 cases resulting in anaphylaxis according to the classification from the World Allergy Organization's Anaphylaxis Guidance of 2020. Based on their research findings, instances of spirulina allergy are infrequently reported or identified.

== See also ==
- Klamath Lake AFA
- Collaborative Inter-Governmental Scientific Research Institute
- Chlorella
