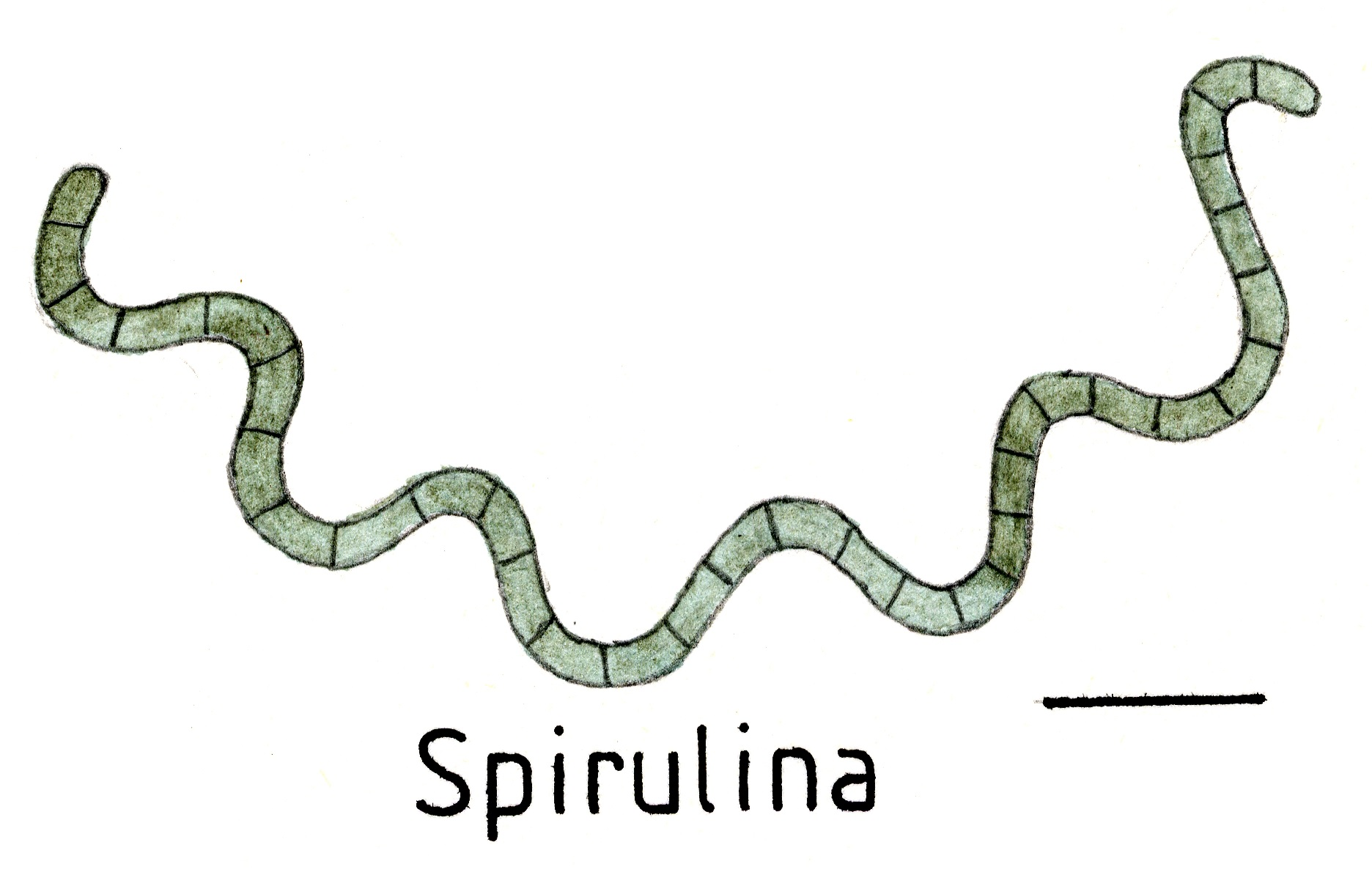
- Spirulina

Scientific classification
- Domain: Bacteria
- Kingdom: Bacillati
- Phylum: Cyanobacteriota
- Class: Cyanophyceae
- Order: Spirulinales; Komárek et al. 2014
- Family: Spirulinaceae (Gomont) Hoffmann, Komárek, & Kaštovský

Genera
- Glaucospira; Halospirulina; Spirulina

Synonyms
- Spirulinoideae Gomont 1892

= Spirulinaceae =

Family of bacteria

The Spirulinaceae is a family of cyanobacteria, the only family in the order Spirulinales. Its members are notable for having coiled trichomes.
