= Strand Releasing =

American film distribution company

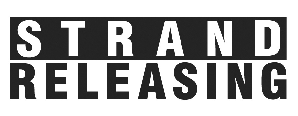
- Industry: Film distribution
- Founded: 1989; 37 years ago
- Founders: Jon Gerrans; Marcus Hu
- Headquarters: Culver City, California, United States
- Products: Motion pictures
- Website: StrandReleasing.com

Strand Releasing is an American film distribution company founded in 1989 and is based in Culver City, California. The company has distributed over 300 auteur-driven titles from acclaimed international and American directors such as Apichatpong Weerasethakul, Gregg Araki, François Ozon, Jean-Luc Godard, Catherine Breillat, Claire Denis, Fatih Akin, Aki Kaurismäki, Claude Miller, Manoel de Oliveira, Gaspar Noé, André Téchiné and Terence Davies.

== Notable reissues ==
- Comic Book Confidential (1988; 2012 reissue) by Ron Mann
- Kiss of the Spider Woman (1985; 2001 reissue) by Héctor Babenco
- Pink Narcissus (1971; 2003 reissue) by James Bidgood
- The Graduate (1967; 1997 re-release) by Mike Nichols
- Faster, Pussycat! Kill! Kill! (1965; 1995 re-release) by Russ Meyer
- Who Killed Teddy Bear (1965; 1995 re-release) by Joseph Cates
- Contempt (1963; 1997 re-release) by Jean-Luc Godard

== Films distributed ==
- 99 Moons (2022)
- Daughter of Mine (2018)
- Zama (2017)
- Tyrannosaur (2011)
- Bad Actress (2011) executive produced by Marcus Hu and Jon Gerrans
- Happiness Runs (2010)
- Feed the Fish (2009)
- Slipstream (2007)
- Psycho Beach Party (2000)
- Innocence (2000)
- Just One Time (1999) executive produced by Marcus Hu
- I Stand Alone (1999)
- Billy's Hollywood Screen Kiss (1998) executive produced by Marcus Hu
- First Love, Last Rites (1997)
- Hustler White (1996)
- Frisk (1995)
- Stalingrad (1995)
- Mod Fuck Explosion (1994) executive produced by Marcus Hu
- Grief (1993) executive produced by Marcus Hu
- The Living End (1992)

== LGBT titles ==
- Sparks (2027) by Fergus Campbell
- Young Hearts (2024) by Anthony Schatteman
- Postcards from London (2018) by Steve McLean
- Sorry Angel (2018) by Christophe Honoré
- The Cakemaker (2017) by Ofir Raul Graizer
- Holding the Man (2016) by Neil Armfield
- Front Cover (2015) by Ray Yeung
- Mala Mala (2014) by Antonio Santini and Dan Sickles
- Lilting (2014) by Hong Khaou
- The Way He Looks (2014) by Daniel Ribeiro
- Noordzee, Texas (2012) by Bavo Defurne
- Desire (2012) by Laurent Bouhnik
- L.A. Zombie (2010) by Bruce LaBruce
- Hideaway (2009) by François Ozon
- Otto (2008) by Bruce LaBruce
- Before I Forget (2007) by Jacques Nolot
- Saturn in Opposition (2007) by Ferzan Özpetek
- The Witnesses (2007) by Andre Techine
- The Bubble (2006) by Eytan Fox
- Time to Leave (2005) by François Ozon
- The Dying Gaul (2005) by Craig Lucas
- Mysterious Skin (2004) by Gregg Araki
- Party Monster (2003) by Randy Barbato and Fenton Bailey
- Son Frere (2003) by Patrice Chéreau
- Yossi and Jagger (2002) by Eytan Fox
- Porn Theater (2002) by Jacques Nolot
- Burnt Money (2002) by Marcelo Piñeyro
- Princesa (2001) by Henrique Goldman
- His Secret Life (2001) by Ferzan Özpetek
- Lan Yu (2001) by Stanley Kwan
- Borstal Boy (2000) by Peter Sheridan
- 101 Rent Boys (2000) by Randy Barbato and Fenton Bailey
- Muscle (1999) by Hisayasu Satō
- Skin Flick (1999) by Bruce LaBruce
- Criminal Lovers (1999) by François Ozon
- Show Me Love (1998) by Lukas Moodysson
- Macho Dancer (1998) by Lino Brocka
- Head On (1998) by Ana Kokkinos
- Edge of Seventeen (1998) by David Moreton
- Steam (1997) by Ferzan Özpetek
- I Think I Do (1997) by Brian Sloan
- The Delta (1996) by Ira Sachs
- Hustler White (1996) by Bruce LaBruce
- Stonewall (1995) by Nigel Finch
- Wild Reeds (1994) by André Téchiné
- Totally F***ed Up (1993) by Gregg Araki
- Super 8½ (1993) by Bruce LaBruce
- No Skin Off My Ass (1993) by Bruce LaBruce
- The Living End (1992) by Gregg Araki
- Swoon (1992) by Tom Kalin
- Young Soul Rebels (1991) by Isaac Julien
- Tongues Untied (1989) by Marlon Riggs
- Looking for Langston (1989) by Isaac Julien
- Three Bewildered People in the Night (1987) by Gregg Araki
- Straight Up (2019) by James Sweeney

== Honors and awards ==
Strand Releasing was honored with a four-week retrospective in 1999 at the New York Museum of Modern Art. The Los Angeles Gay and Lesbian Film Festival, Outfest, honored Strand Releasing with a lifetime achievement award in 2002. In 2009, MOMA honored Strand Releasing with "Carte Blanche" a 20-year retrospective honoring select filmmakers from the Strand roster including Apichatpong Weerasethakul, Fatih Akin, François Ozon and Jacques Nolot, adding their films into the MOMA permanent collection. In 2009, the Yerba Buena Center for the Arts in San Francisco, the Provincetown International Film Festival and the Seattle International Film Festival also honored Strand Releasing with lifetime achievement awards.

== Archive ==
The Strand Releasing Collection at the Academy Film Archive contains trailers and prints for many films released by Strand.
