= List of British films of 1979 =

A list of films produced in the United Kingdom in 1979 (see 1979 in film):

== 1979 ==
Title	Director	Cast	Genre	Notes
1979
Agatha	Michael Apted	Dustin Hoffman, Vanessa Redgrave, Timothy Dalton	Mystery	
Alien	Ridley Scott	Sigourney Weaver, John Hurt, Ian Holm	Sci-fi	Co-production with US
Arabian Adventure	Kevin Connor	Christopher Lee, Oliver Tobias, Milo O'Shea	Fantasy adventure	
Bear Island	Don Sharp	Donald Sutherland, Vanessa Redgrave, Richard Widmark	Adventure	Co-production with Canada
The Bitch	Gerry O'Hara	Joan Collins, Kenneth Haigh, Ian Hendry	Drama	
Confessions from the David Galaxy Affair	Willy Roe	Mary Millington , Alan Lake, Glynn Edwards	Sex Comedy	
Dracula	John Badham	Frank Langella, Kate Nelligan, Laurence Olivier	Horror	
Eagle's Wing	Anthony Harvey	Martin Sheen, Sam Waterston, Harvey Keitel	Western	
Escape to Athena	George P. Cosmatos	Roger Moore, Telly Savalas, David Niven	War adventure	
The Europeans	James Ivory	Lee Remick, Robin Ellis, Tim Woodward	Drama	Entered into the 1979 Cannes Film Festival
Firepower	Michael Winner	Sophia Loren, James Coburn, O.J. Simpson	Action thriller	Co-production with US
A Game for Vultures	James Fargo	Richard Harris, Joan Collins, Richard Roundtree	Thriller	
The Golden Lady	José Ramón Larraz	Ina Skriver, Suzanne Danielle, June Chadwick	Thriller	Co-production with Hong Kong
The Great Riviera Bank Robbery	Francis Megahy	Ian McShane, Warren Clarke, Christopher Malcolm	Crime thriller	
Hanover Street	Peter Hyams	Harrison Ford, Lesley-Anne Down, Christopher Plummer	War romance	Co-production with US
The Human Factor	Otto Preminger	Richard Attenborough, Nicol Williamson, John Gielgud	Thriller	
Jesus	Peter Sykes, Peter Heyman	Brian Deacon, Yosef Shiloach	Biblical	
The Lady Vanishes	Anthony Page	Elliott Gould, Cybill Shepherd	Mystery	
Le Pétomane	Ian MacNaughton	Leonard Rossiter, Graham Stark	Comedy	
Licensed to Love and Kill	Lindsay Shonteff	Gareth Hunt, Fiona Curzon	Spy/action	
Lost and Found	Melvin Frank	George Segal, Glenda Jackson	Romance/comedy	
Meetings with Remarkable Men	Peter Brook	Terence Stamp, Athol Fugard	Drama	Entered into the 29th Berlin International Film Festival
Monty Python's Life of Brian	Terry Jones	The members of Monty Python, Gwen Taylor, Charles McKeown	Comedy	Number 28 in the BFI Top 100 British films
Moonraker	Lewis Gilbert	Roger Moore, Michael Lonsdale, Lois Chiles	Spy/action	Filmed in French studios
Murder by Decree	Bob Clark	Christopher Plummer, James Mason	Mystery	
The Music Machine	Ian Sharp	Gerry Sundquist, Patti Boulaye	Musical	
North Sea Hijack	Andrew McLaglen	Roger Moore, Anthony Perkins, James Mason	Action	
The Passage	J. Lee Thompson	Anthony Quinn, James Mason	World War II	
The Plank	Eric Sykes	Eric Sykes, Arthur Lowe	Comedy	
Quadrophenia	Franc Roddam	Phil Daniels, Leslie Ash, Philip Davis, Mark Wingett	Musical	
The Quatermass Conclusion	Piers Haggard	John Mills, Barbara Kellerman	Sci-fi	Based on the TV series Quatermass
Quincy's Quest	Robert Reed	Tommy Steele, Mel Martin	Family	
Radio On	Christopher Petit	David Beames	Mystery/road	
The Riddle of the Sands	Tony Maylam	Michael York, Jenny Agutter, Simon MacCorkindale	Thriller	
Scum	Alan Clarke	Ray Winstone, Mick Ford, Julian Firth	Prison drama	
A Sense of Freedom	John Mackenzie	David Hayman, Fulton Mackay	Drama	
Sunburn	Richard C. Sarafian	Farrah Fawcett, Charles Grodin	Crime/comedy	Co-production with the US
Tarka the Otter	David Cobham	Henry Williamson, Gerald Durrell	Family	
The Tempest	Derek Jarman	Heathcote Williams, Toyah Willcox	Shakespearean	
Tess	Roman Polanski	Nastassja Kinski, Peter Firth	Literary drama	
That Summer	Harley Cokeliss	Ray Winstone, Tony London	Drama	
The World Is Full of Married Men	Robert Young	Anthony Franciosa, Carroll Baker, Paul Nicholas	Drama	
Yanks	John Schlesinger	Richard Gere, Vanessa Redgrave, Lisa Eichhorn	War drama	
Yesterday's Hero	Neil Leifer	Ian McShane, Suzanne Somers, Paul Nicholas	Sports Drama	

== Documentaries and shorts ==
Title	Director	Cast	Genre	Notes
Anti-Clock	Jane Arden		Drama	
Derek and Clive Get the Horn	Russell Mulcahy	Peter Cook, Dudley Moore	Documentary	
The Kids Are Alright	Jeff Stein	The Who	Documentary	

== Most Popular Films at the British Box Office in 1979 ==
1. Moonraker
2. Superman
3. Jaws 2
4. Every Which Way but Loose
5. Alien
6. Watership Down
7. The Deer Hunter
8. Grease
9. Quadrophenia
10. Pete's Dragon
11. Midnight Express
12. National Lampoon's Animal House
13. Death on the Nile
14. Porridge
15. The Cat from Outer Space
16. Battlestar Galactica
17. The Thirty Nine Steps
18. The Bitch
19. Lord of the Rings
20. The Warriors

== See also ==
- 1979 in British music
- 1979 in British radio
- 1979 in British television
- 1979 in the United Kingdom
