= The Easy Way (film) =

- Film poster
- French: Sans arme, ni haine, ni violence
- Directed by: Jean-Paul Rouve
- Written by: Benoît Graffin; Jean-Paul Rouve
- Produced by: Aïssa Djabri; Pauline Duhault; Farid Lahouassa
- Starring: Jean-Paul Rouve; Alice Taglioni; Gilles Lellouche
- Cinematography: Christophe Offenstein
- Edited by: Stan Collet
- Music by: Alexandre Azaria
- Distributed by: Mars Distribution
- Release date: 16 April 2008
- Running time: 100 minutes
- Country: France
- Language: French
- Budget: $8.6 million
- Box office: $3.7 million

The Easy Way (French: Sans arme, ni haine, ni violence; lit. 'Without weapons, hatred or violence') is a 2008 French heist film directed by Jean-Paul Rouve, who also stars in the title role as the real life thief Albert Spaggiari, who organized a break-in into a Société Générale bank in Nice, France in 1976. The original French title refers to the note Albert Spaggiari left in the bank after completing the robbery.

Part of the movie was shot in Portugal at the Hotel Palácio Estoril, a 5-star hotel where some scenes of the James Bond film On Her Majesty's Secret Service were also shot.

== Plot ==
In 1977 in Nice, Albert Spaggiari is arrested by the police and brought to a judge's office for interrogation, but he manages to escape by jumping out of the window and riding off on a motorcycle with an accomplice. He travels to South America where he meets new faces including a mysterious journalist who wants to interview him about the heist and his whereabouts.

== Cast ==
- Jean-Paul Rouve as Albert Spaggiari
- Alice Taglioni as Julia
- Gilles Lellouche as Vincent Goumard
- Florence Loiret Caille as Nathalie Goumard
- Patrick Bosso as The gangster
- Anne Marivin as The cop
- Pom Klementieff as NHI
- Gérard Depardieu as The godfather

== See also ==
- Les Égouts du paradis (1979)
- The Great Riviera Bank Robbery (1979)
