= 1979 in British radio =

This is a list of events in British radio during 1979.

== Events ==
=== January ===
- 27 January – BBC Radio 2's last closedown at 02:02. Sarah Kennedy is at the Newsdesk after Brian Matthew finishes "Round Midnight". From 02:00 to 05:00 the following night, listeners hear "You and the Night and the Music". Radio 2 has the longest period of continuous broadcasting of any national radio station in the UK.
- 29 January – BBC Radio 1 begins its delayed weeknight mid-evening programme with Andy Peebles joining to host the new programme. It had originally been scheduled to launch on 13 November 1978 but was delayed as a result of trade union disputes.

=== March ===
- 25 March – Prokofiev's opera Maddalena receives its world premiere as a BBC Radio 3 broadcast (from a studio recording), with Jill Gomez in the title role.

=== April ===
- 1 April – The first edition of Feedback is broadcast on BBC Radio 4.

=== May ===
- 5 May – The first Radio Lollipop, a cable-wired station for children in hospital, goes on air, broadcasting to Queen Mary's Hospital for Children in Surrey, England.

=== September ===
- 2 September – Tony Blackburn replaces Simon Bates as host of Radio 1's Top 40 show.
- Undated in September – Prime Minister Margaret Thatcher considers introducing advertising for some BBC radio services, but later abandons the idea after encountering opposition.

=== October ===
- 5 October – The Scottish Gaelic service BBC Radio nan Eilean launches, broadcasting to north west Scotland from Stornoway.

=== November ===
- 15 November – BBC Radio 4 begins broadcasting on MW in London. Listeners struggle to get buzz-free and crackle-free reception on long wave due to large steel-framed buildings. This issue does not affect MW broadcasts so the transmitter is brought into service to provide a satisfactory signal for the station's long wave output for listeners in central London.
- Undated in November – A weekday mid-morning programme launches on BBC Radio Cymru, thereby extending its broadcasting hours to 65 hours each week. Previously, apart from extended news bulletins at lunchtime and early evening, and some off-peak opt-outs, the station had only been on air at breakfast time.

=== December ===
- 16 December – After a decade on air, United Biscuits closes down its internal radio station United Biscuits Network due to it being seen as no longer necessary to operate a radio station due to the rollout of independent commercial stations.
- 17 December – A major storm causes BBC Radio 4 on long wave from Droitwich to fall off the air when strong winds damaged the antenna behind repair. The service is restored three days later.

== Station debuts ==
- 5 May – Radio Lollipop
- 11 September – BBC Radio Foyle

== Programme debuts ==
- 1 April – Feedback on BBC Radio 4 (1979–Present)
- 7 July – Science in Action on BBC World Service (1979–2025)
- 29 September – Breakaway on BBC Radio 4 (1979–1998)
- 30 September – The Food Programme on BBC Radio 4 (1979–Present)
- October – Tony's on BBC Radio 2 (1979–1981)

== Continuing radio programmes ==
=== 1940s ===
- Sunday Half Hour (1940–2018)
- Desert Island Discs (1942–Present)
- Down Your Way (1946–1992)
- Letter from America (1946–2004)
- Woman's Hour (1946–Present)
- A Book at Bedtime (1949–Present)

=== 1950s ===
- The Archers (1950–Present)
- The Today Programme (1957–Present)
- Sing Something Simple (1959–2001)
- Your Hundred Best Tunes (1959–2007)

=== 1960s ===
- Farming Today (1960–Present)
- In Touch (1961–Present)
- The World at One (1965–Present)
- The Official Chart (1967–Present)
- Just a Minute (1967–Present)
- The Living World (1968–Present)
- The Organist Entertains (1969–2018)

=== 1970s ===
- PM (1970–Present)
- Start the Week (1970–Present)
- Week Ending (1970–1998)
- You and Yours (1970–Present)
- I'm Sorry I Haven't a Clue (1972–Present)
- Good Morning Scotland (1973–Present)
- Kaleidoscope (1973–1998)
- Newsbeat (1973–Present)
- The News Huddlines (1975–2001)
- The Burkiss Way (1976–1980)
- File on 4 (1977–Present)
- Money Box (1977–Present)
- The News Quiz (1977–Present)

== Ending this year ==
- 11 November – Hello Cheeky (BBC Radio 2) (1973–1979)
- The Enchanting World of Hinge and Bracket (BBC Radio 4) (1977–1979)

== Closing this year ==
- 16 December – United Biscuits Network (1970–1979)

== Births ==
- 8 March – Zena McNally, singer and radio presenter
- 9 March – Adele Roberts, disc jockey
- 4 April – OJ Borg, broadcast presenter
- 4 May – Wes Butters, radio presenter
- 20 May – Rick Edwards, broadcast presenter
- 8 September – Miles Jupp, comedy performer
- 17 October – Lucy Horobin, radio presenter
- 28 November – Anna Foster, BBC radio current affairs presenter

== Deaths ==
- 23 February – Albert Modley, comedy entertainer, 77
- 9 September – Ronnie Taylor, broadcast comedy scriptwriter and producer, 58
- 27 September – Gracie Fields, singer and actress, BBC and Radio Luxembourg broadcaster, 81
- 8 November – Sydney Tafler, actor, 63
- 30 November – Joyce Grenfell, actress, comedian and singer, 69
- December – Peter Eton, broadcast comedy producer, 62
- Bob Oliver Rogers, radio comedy producer, 29

== See also ==
- 1979 in British music
- 1979 in British television
- 1979 in the United Kingdom
- List of British films of 1979
