= 1979 in British television =

This is a list of British television related events from 1979.

== Events ==
=== January ===
- 2 January
  - BBC2 airs the first episode of Michael Wood's groundbreaking history documentary series, In Search of the Dark Ages.
  - Debut of the game show Give Us a Clue on ITV.
- 3 January – The children's series The Book Tower makes its debut on ITV, featuring dramatizations of books as well as interviews with authors.
- 3 January – ITV programming resumes in the Yorkshire Television region at 5.45pm, with the station off air for the previous seventeen days due to industrial action.
- 6 January – The US police series CHiPs makes its debut on ITV.
- 16 January – David Attenborough's nature documentary Life on Earth debuts on BBC2.
- 18 January – The game show Blankety Blank makes its debut on BBC1, presented by Terry Wogan.
- 28 January – Thomas & Sarah, a spin-off of Upstairs, Downstairs, makes its debut on ITV. It runs for only one series.

=== February ===
- 18 February – Debut of the series Antiques Roadshow on BBC1.
- 25 February – The children's series Worzel Gummidge makes its debut on ITV, starring Jon Pertwee.

=== March ===
- 3 March – Two American series makes their British television debuts on BBC1, aimed at younger audiences:
  - The Hardy Boys/Nancy Drew Mysteries.
  - Action comedy The Dukes of Hazzard.
- 10 March – The US sitcom Mork and Mindy makes its British debut on ITV, starring Robin Williams.
- 16 March
  - The long-running American children's series Sesame Street is shown for the first time on STV.
  - ITV Midlands shows the 1973 folk horror film The Wicker Man, starring Edward Woodward, Christopher Lee and Britt Ekland. ITV Granada, Yorkshire and Southern show the film on 2 April, 29 June and 15 December respectively.
- 19 March – Richard Beckinsale, best known for The Lovers, Rising Damp, Porridge (and its spin-off Going Straight) and Bloomers, dies of a congenital heart defect at the age of 31.
- 24 March – Tales of the Unexpected, an Anglia series based on the short stories of Roald Dahl, makes its debut on ITV.

=== April ===
- 27 April – Daisy, Daisy is broadcast for the final time.

=== May ===
- 3–4 May – BBC1 and ITV air coverage of the 1979 general election, which is won by the Conservatives and sees Margaret Thatcher become the first female prime minister of the United Kingdom. The election sees both the Conservatives and Labour include plans for a fourth channel in their election manifestos. Labour favours an Open Broadcasting Authority community service aimed at minority groups while the Conservatives plan is for the channel to be given to ITV, but expresses a preference for a fourth channel to be an independent entity. Both parties also pledge to launch a separate Welsh language television service for Wales.
- 21 May – John Craven's Newsround goes on its summer break as it has done since its launch in 1972. When it returns on 10 September, it will run all year round.
- 28 May – Once Upon a Time, a television programme for preschoolers and the replacement programme for Daisy, Daisy, makes its debut on ITV.
- May – The new Conservative government decides against a Welsh fourth channel and suggests that, except for an occasional opt-out provided by HTV Wales, the fourth channel service should be the same as that offered in the rest of the country.

=== June ===
- 9 June – Debut of the entertainment series The Paul Daniels Magic Show on BBC1, which goes on to attract an audience of 15 million viewers.
- 23 June – BBC2 launches the world's first computer-generated ident, the 'Computer Generated 2'.

=== July ===
- 7 July – The final episode in the original run of Celebrity Squares is broadcast on ITV, although it would be revived at the start of 1993.
- 10 July – The supernatural science-fiction series Sapphire & Steel makes its debut on ITV, starring Joanna Lumley and David McCallum.
- 28 July – The variety show The Cannon and Ball Show makes its debut on ITV, starring Tommy Cannon and Bobby Ball.

=== August ===
- 6 August
  - Technicians at ITV Thames go on strike following a long-running dispute.
  - Debut of the motocross game show Kick Start on BBC1.
  - A Picture of Tom Keating is rebroadcast with a new sequence covering Keating's trial in February.
- 10 August – The whole of the ITV network, except Channel Television, is affected by a technicians strike. No ITV programmes are broadcast for the following eleven weeks.
- 25 August – BBC1 shows the 1966 Batman movie. This is the first UK wide broadcast after previously being shown on only a select few ITV regions.
- 27 August – Lord Mountbatten of Burma is murdered by a Provisional Irish Republican Army bomb. His death sets a record audience for a news bulletin as twenty-six million viewers watch the coverage on BBC1. Strike action at ITN has led to the record viewing figures.

=== September ===
- 2 September – Subtitling of programmes on Ceefax begins.
- 3 September – Battle of the Planets, the American adaptation of the Japanese science-fiction animated series Gatchaman, makes its debut on BBC1. It is shown until 1985.
- 7 September – BBC1 begins showing the American children's series The Red Hand Gang.
- 10 September – The first episode of John le Carré's Tinker Tailor Soldier Spy airs on BBC2 with Alec Guinness as George Smiley.
- 25 September – Robin Day presents the first edition of the political debate programme Question Time on BBC1 with panellists Michael Foot, Edna O'Brien, Teddy Taylor and Derek Worlock. It continues to air into the 2020s.
- 27 September – Debut of the sitcom Bloomers on BBC2, starring Richard Beckinsale, in his final television appearance.
- 30 September
  - The detective drama series Shoestring debuts on BBC1, starring Trevor Eve as the titular detective.
  - BBC1 launches the sitcom To the Manor Born, starring Penelope Keith and Peter Bowles. The final episode of the series, shown on 11 November, is watched by 23.95 million viewers, the all-time highest figure for a recorded programme in the UK.
- September – Home Secretary Willie Whitelaw outlines plans for a fourth channel. However, he backs away from establishing a Welsh language channel for Wales, instead favouring a continuation of the status quo whereby Welsh language content is aired by BBC Wales and HTV.

=== October ===
- 16 October – The comedy sketch show Not the Nine O'Clock News makes it debut on BBC2, starring Rowan Atkinson, Pamela Stevenson, Mel Smith and Griff Rhys Jones.
- 24 October
  - ITV begins broadcasting again after eleven weeks of industrial strike action by technicians. The schedule beings with a new series of The Muppet Show. ITV also shows the fourth and final series of Quatermass, featuring Professor Bernard Quatermass. The title character is played by John Mills.
  - The sitcom Terry and June makes its debut on BBC1, starring Terry Scott and June Whitfield as a suburban couple.
- 25 October – "Basil the Rat", the final episode of the sitcom Fawlty Towers, is broadcast on BBC2.
- 27 October – The Saturday Morning children's show Tiswas returns to ITV, with Lenny Henry joining the team. The live show now broadcasts to London, Midlands, Granada, Yorkshire and HTV.
- 29 October
  - ITV launches the hospital-set sitcom Only When I Laugh, starring James Bolam and Peter Bowles.
  - The comedy-drama series Minder makes its debut on ITV, starring George Cole and Dennis Waterman. Minder becomes one of ITV's most popular programmes, at one point attracting 16.4 million viewers.

=== November ===
- 16 November – The Japanese martial arts fantasy series Monkey makes its debut on BBC2, with dubbed English dialogue.

=== December ===
- 18 December – BBC1 airs Gawain and the Green Knight, Stephen Weeks' 1973 film starring Murray Head and Nigel Green and based on the medieval poem of the same name.
- 21 December – BBC1 show a season of The Beatles movies, starting with Magical Mystery Tour, Help! on 22 December and Yellow Submarine on 24 December.
- 23 December – BBC1 screens the blockbuster 1972 disaster film The Poseidon Adventure, starring Gene Hackman, Ernest Borgnine, Red Buttons, Roddy McDowall and Shelley Winters.
- 25 December
  - Christmas Day highlights on BBC1 includes the network television premiere of the 1973 crime caper movie The Sting, starring Paul Newman and Robert Redford.
  - ITV shows the Richard Lester-directed 1973 film version of The Three Musketeers, starring Michael York, Oliver Reed, Raquel Welch, Faye Dunaway, Charlton Heston and Christopher Lee.
- 26 December – Network television premieres of:
  - 1968 WWII action-adventure film Where Eagles Dare on BBC1, starring Clint Eastwood and Richard Burton.
  - Nicolas Roeg's 1973 horror film Don't Look Now on BBC2, starring Donald Sutherland and Julie Christie.

=== Unknown ===
- The Independent Broadcasting Authority begins broadcasting its own test card on ITV instead of Test Card F.

== Debuts ==
=== BBC1 ===
- 3 January
  - The Aphrodite Inheritance (1979)
  - The Strange Affair of Adelaide Harris (1979)
- 4 January – Anne of Green Gables (1979)
- 5 January – Running Blind (1979)
- 7 January
  - Telford's Change (1979)
  - The Fourth Arm (1979)
- 17 January – Rebecca (1979)
- 18 January – Blankety Blank (1979–1990, 1997–1999, ITV 2001–2002)
- 30 January – Blue Remembered Hills (1979)
- 18 February – Antiques Roadshow (1979–present)
- 23 February – The Dawson Watch (1979–1980)
- 1 March – Potter (1979–1983)
- 3 March
  - The Hardy Boys and Nancy Drew Mysteries (1977–1979)
  - The Dukes of Hazzard (1979–1985)
- 18 March – My Son, My Son (1979)
- 21 March – The Perishers (1979)
- 17 April – The Mourning Brooch (1979)
- 11 May – Two Up, Two Down (1979)
- 26 May – Goodbye Darling (1979–1981)
- 6 June – The Deep Concern (1979)
- 9 June – The Paul Daniels Magic Show (1979–1994)
- 13 June – The Omega Factor (1979)
- 28 June – Captain Caveman and the Teen Angels (1977–1980)
- 16 July – Jigsaw (1979–1984)
- 6 August – Kick Start (1979–1988)
- 3 September – Battle of the Planets (1978–1980)
- 4 September
  - A Moment in Time (1979)
  - Prince Regent (1979)
- 7 September – The Red Hand Gang (1977)
- 11 September – Rolf Harris Cartoon Time (1979–1987)
- 25 September – Question Time (1979–present)
- 30 September
  - To the Manor Born (1979–1981, 2007)
  - Shoestring (1979–1980)
- 3 October – Grandad (1979–1984)
- 4 October – The All-New Popeye Show (1978–1983)
- 7 October – The Legend of King Arthur (1979)
- 12 October – Penmarric (1979)
- 24 October – Terry and June (1979–1987)
- 7 November – The Enchanted Castle (1979)
- 25 November – Suez 1956 (1979)
- 4 December – Anne of Green Gables (1979)
- 9 December – The Old Curiosity Shop (1979–1980)
- 23 December – Shalcken the Painter (1979)
- 24 December – What-a-Mess (1979–1980, 1990)

=== BBC2 ===
- 16 January – Life on Earth (1979)
- 17 January – The Innes Book of Records (1979–1981)
- 15 March – Malice Aforethought (1979)
- 18 April – Matilda's England (1979)
- 22 May – Crime and Punishment (1979)
- 24 June
  - Big Jim and the Figaro Club (1979–1981)
  - Turning Year Tales (1979)
- 2 September – Diary of a Nobody (1979)
- 6 September – Fred Dibnah: Steeplejack (1979)
- 10 September – Tinker Tailor Soldier Spy (1979)
- 26 September – The Camerons (1979)
- 27 September – Bloomers (1979)
- 16 October – Not the Nine O'Clock News (1979–1982)
- 28 October – Friday Night, Saturday Morning (1979–1982)
- 4 November – Testament of Youth (1979)
- 15 November – Kelly Monteith (1979–1984)
- 16 November – Monkey (1978–1980)

=== ITV ===
- 2 January
  - Give Us a Clue (1979–1992, ITV, 1997, BBC)
  - Room Service (1979)
- 3 January – The Book Tower (1979–1989)
- 6 January
  - CHiPs (1977–1983)
  - Dick Turpin (1979–1982)
  - Dick Barton – Special Agent (1979)
- 8 January
  - The Ken Dodd Laughter Show (1979)
  - Feet First (1979)
  - Danger UXB (1979)
- 11 January – The Jim Davidson Show (1979–1982)
- 14 January – Thomas & Sarah (1979)
- 17 January – Take My Wife (1979)
- 2 February – Flambards (1979)
- 21 February – Park Ranger (1979)
- 23 February – House of Caradus (1979)
- 25 February – Worzel Gummidge (1979–1981 ITV, 1987–1989, 2019 BBC)
- 27 February – How's Your Father? (1979–1980)
- 10 March – Mork & Mindy (1978–1982)
- 11 March – Agony (1979–1981)
- 22 March – The Secret Hospital (1979) (documentary)
- 24 March – Tales of the Unexpected (1979–1985, 1987–1988)
- 2 April –Chalk and Cheese (1979)
- 7 April
  - Kidnapped (1979)
  - Lovely Couple (1979)
- 15 April – End of Part One (1979–1980)
- 23 April
  - The Boy Merlin (1979)
  - Turtle's Progress (1979–1980)
- 28 April – After Julius (1979)
- 21 May – In Loving Memory (1979–1986)
- 22 May – Thundercloud (1979)
- 3 June – The Danedyke Mystery (1979)
- 10 June – The Mallens (1979–1980)
- 9 July – Spooner's Patch (1979–1982)
- 10 July – Sapphire & Steel (1979–1982)
- 11 July – Murder at the Wedding (1979)
- 12 July – Shelley (1979–1984, 1988–1992)
- 27 July
  - Charles Endell Esquire (1979–1980)
  - Heartland (1979–1980)
- 28 July – The Cannon and Ball Show (1979–1988)
- 29 July
  - Screenplay (1979–1981)
  - Tropic (1979)
- 8 August – Border Country (1979)
- 12 August – Sally Ann (1979)
- 24 October – Quatermass (1979)
- 29 October
  - Only When I Laugh (1979–1982)
  - Minder (1979–1994, 2009)
- 10 November – Two People (1979)
- 11 November
  - The Glums (1979)
  - Quest of Eagles (1979)
- 21 November – The Dick Francis Thriller: The Racing Game (1979–1980)
- 1 December – The Allan Stewart Tapes (1979)
- 23 December – Cribb (1979–1981)
- 31 December – The Ravelled Thread (1979)
- Unknown
  - The Sullivans (1976–1983)
  - Don't Just Sit There! (1979–1980)

=== BBC Scotland ===
- 7 October – Can Seo (1979)

== Television shows ==
=== Changes of network affiliation ===
Shows	Moved from	Moved to
Noggin the Nog	BBC One	BBC Two

=== Returning this year after a break of one year or longer ===
- Fawlty Towers (1975, 1979)
- Noggin the Nog (1959–1965, 1979–1982)
- Your Life in Their Hands (1958–1964, 1979–1987, 1991)

== Continuing television shows ==
=== 1920s ===
- BBC Wimbledon (1927–1939, 1946–2019, 2021–present)

=== 1930s ===
- Trooping the Colour (1937–1939, 1946–2019, 2023–present)
- The Boat Race (1938–1939, 1946–2019, 2021–present)
- BBC Cricket (1939, 1946–1999, 2020–2024)

=== 1950s ===
- Come Dancing (1950–1998)
- The Good Old Days (1953–1983)
- Panorama (1953–present)
- Crackerjack (1955–1984, 2020–present)
- What the Papers Say (1956–2008)
- The Sky at Night (1957–present)
- Blue Peter (1958–present)
- Grandstand (1958–2007)

=== 1960s ===
- Coronation Street (1960–present)
- Animal Magic (1962–1983)
- Doctor Who (1963–1989, 1996, 2005–present)
- World in Action (1963–1998)
- Top of the Pops (1964–2006)
- Match of the Day (1964–present)
- Crossroads (1964–1988, 2001–2003)
- Play School (1964–1988)
- Mr. and Mrs. (1965–1999)
- World of Sport (1965–1985)
- Jackanory (1965–1996, 2006)
- Sportsnight (1965–1997)
- Call My Bluff (1965–2005)
- It's a Knockout (1966–1982, 1999–2001)
- The Money Programme (1966–2010)
- ITV Playhouse (1967–1982)
- Reksio (1967–1990)
- Magpie (1968–1980)
- The Big Match (1968–2002)
- Nationwide (1969–1983)
- Screen Test (1969–1984)

=== 1970s ===
- The Goodies (1970–1982)
- The Onedin Line (1971–1980)
- The Old Grey Whistle Test (1971–1987)
- The Two Ronnies (1971–1987, 1991, 1996, 2005)
- Thunderbirds (1972–1980, 1984–1987)
- Clapperboard (1972–1982)
- Crown Court (1972–1984)
- Pebble Mill at One (1972–1986, 1991–1996)
- Rainbow (1972–1992, 1994–1997)
- Are You Being Served? (1972–1985)
- Emmerdale (1972–present)
- Newsround (1972–present)
- Weekend World (1972–1988)
- Pipkins (1973–1981)
- We Are the Champions (1973–1987)
- Last of the Summer Wine (1973–2010)
- That's Life! (1973–1994)
- It Ain't Half Hot Mum (1974–1981)
- Tiswas (1974–1982)
- Wish You Were Here...? (1974–2003)
- The Cuckoo Waltz (1975–1980)
- Arena (1975–present)
- Jim'll Fix It (1975–1994)
- Gambit (1975–1985, 1995)
- The Muppet Show (1976–1981)
- When the Boat Comes In (1976–1981)
- Multi-Coloured Swap Shop (1976–1982)
- Rentaghost (1976–1984)
- One Man and His Dog (1976–present)
- Robin's Nest (1977–1981)
- You're Only Young Twice (1977–1981)
- The Professionals (1977–1983)
- Blake's 7 (1978–1981)
- Leave it to Charlie (1978–1980)
- Ski Sunday (1978–present)
- Strangers (1978–1982)
- Butterflies (1978–1983, 2000)
- 3-2-1 (1978–1988)
- Grange Hill (1978–2008)

== Ending this year ==
- 5 January – The Liver Birds (1969–1979, 1996)
- 11 March – Return of the Saint (1978–1979)
- 7 July – Celebrity Squares (1975–1979, 1993–1997, 2014–2015)
- 25 October – Fawlty Towers (1975–1979)
- 16 November – Sykes (1972–1979)
- 19 December – General Hospital (1972–1979)
- 25 December – George and Mildred (1976–1979)
  Anne of Green Gables (1979)

== Births ==
- 8 January – Tomasz Schafernaker, Polish-born weather presenter
- 23 January – Dawn O'Porter, Scottish fashion designer and journalist
- 2 February – Christine Bleakley, television presenter
- 13 February – Lucy Brown, actress
- 10 March – Laura Rogers, actress
- 20 March – Freema Agyeman, actress
- 12 April – Paul Nicholls, actor
- 29 April – Jo O'Meara, singer, dancer and actress
- 10 May – Lara Lewington, weather and television presenter
- 20 May – Rick Edwards, television presenter
- 27 May – Jeff Brazier, television presenter and reality show contestant
- 12 June – Jodie Prenger, actress and singer
- 27 July – Julia Haworth, actress
- 9 November – Caroline Flack, television presenter and actress (died 2020)
- 19 November – Katherine Kelly, actress
- 29 November – Simon Amstell, comedian and television presenter
- Unknown
  - Roisin Conaty, actress
  - Leanne Lakey, actress
  - Rosamund Pike, actress

== Deaths ==
Date	Name	Age	Cinematic Credibility
16 January	Peter Butterworth	63	actor (Carry On, Doctor Who)
28 February	Jane Hylton	51	actress (The Adventures of Sir Lancelot)
6 March	John Robinson	70	actor (Quatermass II)
19 March	Richard Beckinsale	31	actor
24 March	Yvonne Mitchell	63	actress (Nineteen Eighty-Four)
30 May	Jack Raine	82	actor
4 July	Marjorie Rhodes	82	actress
6 July	Malcolm Hulke	54	screenwriter (Doctor Who)
7 July	Ian Mackintosh	39	TV writer (air crash; disappeared, presumed dead)
24 July	Archie Duncan	65	actor (Little John in The Adventures of Robin Hood)
23 August	Richard Hearne	71	comic performer ("Mr Pastry")
7 September	Alan Browning	53	actor (Coronation Street)
23 September	Catherine Lacey	75	actress
20 November	Michael Darbyshire	62	actor (Rentaghost)
30 November	Joyce Grenfell	69	actress, comedian and singer-songwriter

== See also ==
- 1979 in British music
- 1979 in British radio
- 1979 in the United Kingdom
- List of British films of 1979
