= Albert Spaggiari =

French criminal

- Born: 14 December 1932; Laragne-Montéglin, Hautes-Alpes, France
- Died: 8 June 1989 (aged 56); Hyères, France
- Occupations: Photographer; Paratrooper
- Status: Deceased
- Criminal charges: Bank robbery
- Penalty: Life imprisonment (in absentia)

Albert Spaggiari (14 December 1932 – 8 June 1989), nicknamed Bert, was a French criminal chiefly known as the organizer of a break-in into a Société Générale bank in Nice, France, in July 1976 that resulted in the theft of an estimated 46 million francs, none of which were ever found.

== Early life ==
Albert Spaggiari was born on 14 December 1932 in Laragne-Montéglin in the Hautes-Alpes to Richard and Marcelle (née Clément) Spaggiari. His father died in 1935 and he grew up in Hyères, where his mother ran a lingerie store.

At the age of 19, he enlisted as a paratrooper in the First Indochina War, and was posted to the 3rd Battalion colonial paratroopers. During this time, he and a few accomplices put a gun to the head of someone that they claimed had robbed them. The military court, however, believed that this was actually a stickup, and Spaggiari spent the next four years in jail.

Following his release, he moved to North Africa and joined the Organisation armée secrète (OAS), a right-wing group that wanted to prevent Algerian independence. This later led him to be sentenced to three and a half more years in jail, on the charges of political terrorism.

Spaggiari, seemingly having had put politics behind him, then moved to Nice, France, alongside his wife, Audi. They lived in a country villa, called The Wild Geese, where they raised chickens. He also worked as a photographer.

== Work with the DINA ==
Albert Spaggiari and the Corsican Brotherhood (CB) were recruited in France by the Chilean secret police, Dirección de Inteligencia Nacional; Spaggiari had a good relationship with Augusto Pinochet. His codename was "Daniel". This group was called the DINA "Brigada Corsa" ("Corsican Brigade").

According to a CIA document declassified in 2000 and published by the National Security Archive, Michael Townley, the DINA international agent responsible for the Assassination of Orlando Letelier, a member of Salvador Allende's government, in Washington, DC, 1976, was in contact with Spaggiari. Information contained in the document suggests that Spaggiari conducted operations on behalf of DINA.

== Bank robbery in Nice ==
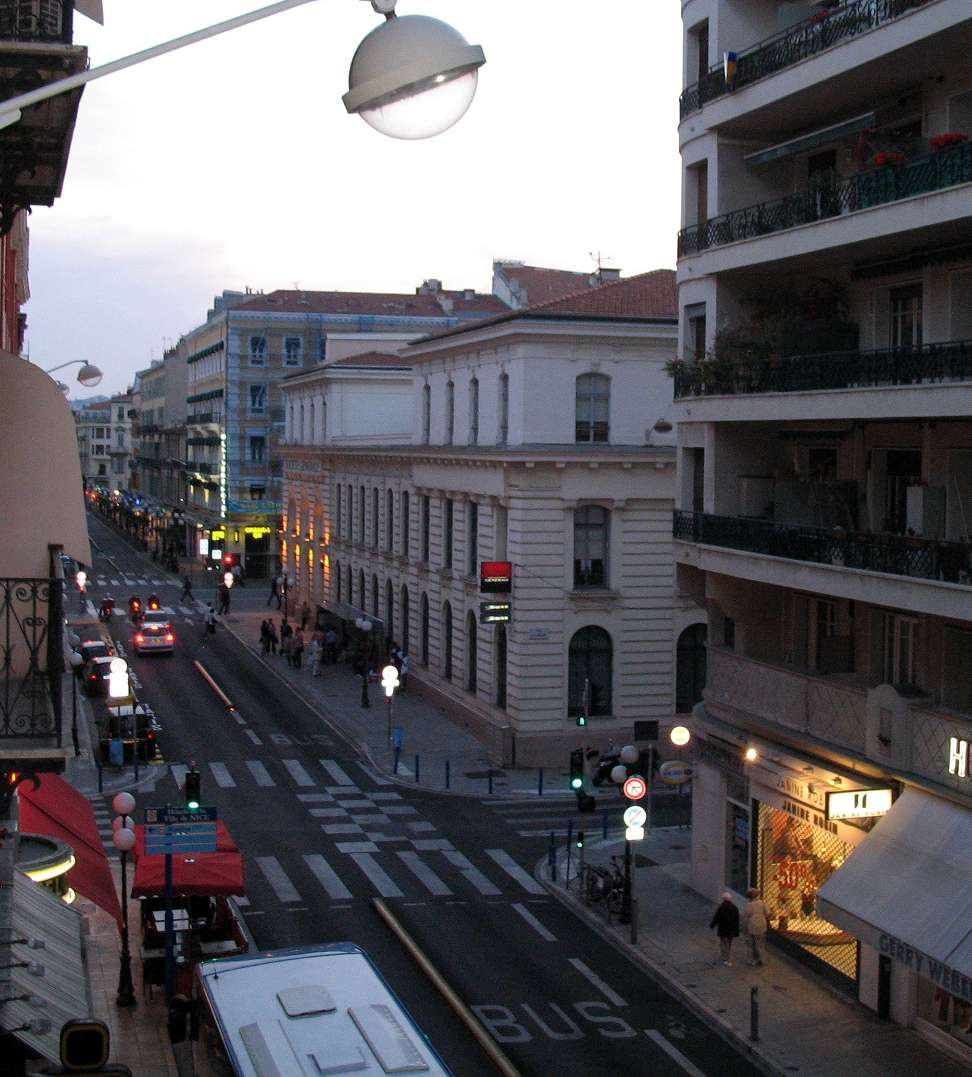
Société Générale Bank in Nice

After Spaggiari heard that the sewers were close to the vault of the Société Générale bank in Nice, he recruited accomplices through the OAS to access the vault from the sewer system and remove its proceeds. The heist involved at least 20 people, 6 of whom were later arrested, and 30 tanks of acetylene. The men accessed the sewers and spent two months digging an eight-metre-long (26 ft) tunnel from the sewer to the vault floor. They used rubber rafts and installed hundreds of metres of electrical cables for lighting. They set up picnic tables for meals and air mattresses for sleeping.

On 16 July 1976, during the long weekend of Bastille Day, when most locals were on vacation, Spaggiari's gang broke into the vault. They stole an estimated 46 million francs worth of money, securities and valuables. It was the largest heist in the history of bank robberies to that date.

They spent hours picking through the various safe deposit boxes. Before they left on 20 July they left a message on the walls of the vault: sans armes, ni haine, ni violence (transl. "without weapons, neither hatred, nor violence").

=== Claim of responsibility by Cassandri ===
In 2010, Jacques Cassandri published a book, The Truth about the Nice Heist, in which he claimed responsibility for the 1976 robbery and that Albert Spaggiari only played a small part. He could not be prosecuted for the crime under French law as the statute of limitations had expired. However, he was arrested on suspicion of later money laundering, using proceeds of the robbery to fund business ventures in Marseilles and Corsica. About twenty people were held for questioning in connection with the case, including Cassandri's wife and children and a Corsican politician. Cassandri said that he made the equivalent of €2 million from the robbery and quickly spent it, although prosecutors noted that he continued to lead a lavish life from the proceeds. Cassandri claimed at trial that the book was a work of fiction and was ultimately acquitted on the most serious charges of organized crime and money laundering, but was convicted of other charges relating to his business practices including fraud and influence peddling and jailed for 30 months.

== Capture and escape ==
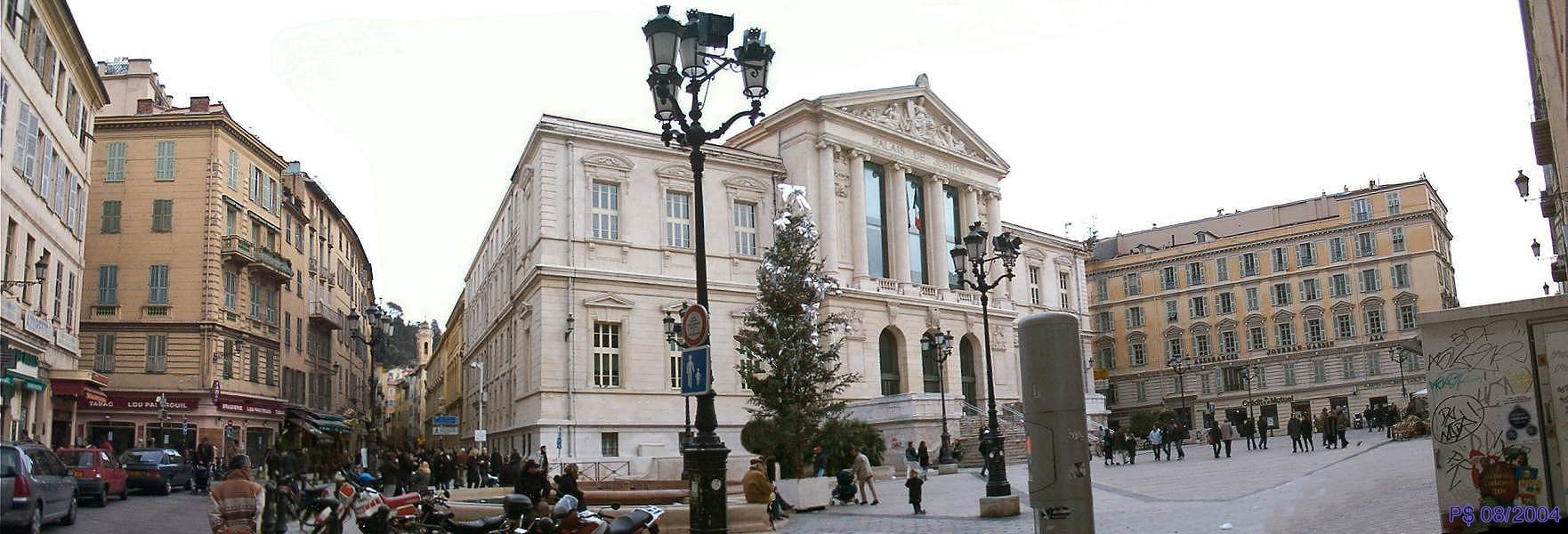
The courthouse and the Rue de la Préfecture, along which Spaggiari escaped after jumping from one of the windows.

At first the French police were baffled. However, at the end of October, on a tip from a former girlfriend, they arrested one of the thieves. After a lengthy interrogation he implicated the entire gang, including Spaggiari. When Spaggiari, who had been accompanying the mayor of Nice Jacques Médecin in the Far East as a photographer, returned to Nice, he was arrested at the airport.

Spaggiari chose Jacques Peyrat, a veteran of the French Foreign Legion who belonged at the time to the National Front, as his defence attorney. Spaggiari first denied his involvement in the break-in, then acknowledged it but claimed that he was working to fund a secret political organization named Catena (Italian for "chain") that seems to have existed only in his fantasy.

During his case hearings, Spaggiari made a coded fictitious document which he claimed as evidence. He was in court on 10 March 1977. While judge Richard Bouaziz was distracted by the document, Spaggiari jumped out of a window, landing safely on a parked car and escaped on a waiting motorcycle. Some reports said that the owner of the car later received a 5,000-franc cheque in the mail for the damage to his roof.

In 1995, Jacques Peyrat accused Christian Estrosi, French minister and former motorcycle champion, of having been Spaggiari's driver, but Estrosi proved that he had been racing in Daytona Beach, Florida, at the time.

== Life in hiding ==
Spaggiari remained free for the rest of his life. He was sentenced via a trial in absentia to life imprisonment. He is reported to have had plastic surgery to change his appearance, and to have spent probably most of the rest of his life in Argentina, visiting France clandestinely to see his mother or his wife "Audi".

While publishing his last book Le journal d'une truffe a 15-minute interview with him by Bernard Pivot was recorded, reportedly in Milan, Italy, for the TV program Apostrophes.

== Death ==
Spaggiari, a heavy smoker, died of lung cancer at age 56. His body was found by his mother in front of his home in Hyères on 10 June 1989. He had no children.

== Works ==
- Faut pas rire avec les barbares (1977)
- Les égouts du paradis (1978)
- Le journal d'une truffe (1983)

Translated into English by Martin Sokolinsky and published as Fric-Frac: The Great Riviera Bank Robbery (1979) and The Sewers of Gold (1981).

== Popular culture ==
French authors René Louis Maurice and Jean-Claude Simoën wrote the book Cinq Milliards au bout de l'égout (1977) about Spaggiari's bank heist in Nice. Their work was translated to English in 1978 by British author Ken Follett under the title The Heist of the Century; it was also published as The Gentleman of 16 July and Under the Streets of Nice.

Three films were produced which were also based on the Nice bank robbery:

- Les égouts du paradis, a 1979 French film directed by José Giovanni.
- The Great Riviera Bank Robbery, also known Dirty Money and Sewers of Gold, a 1979 British film directed by Francis Megahy.
- Sans arme, ni haine, ni violence, a 2008 French film directed by Jean-Paul Rouve.

The Canadian television series Masterminds produced and aired an episode titled "The Riviera Job," reenacting the story of the robbery.

A Czech film, Prachy dělaj člověka, contains a reference to the heist, suggesting that one of the characters participated in it.

In 2016, Italian author Carlos D'Ercole published a book about the heist titled Le Fogne del paradiso.
