= Kamini (rapper) =

French rapper and screenwriter

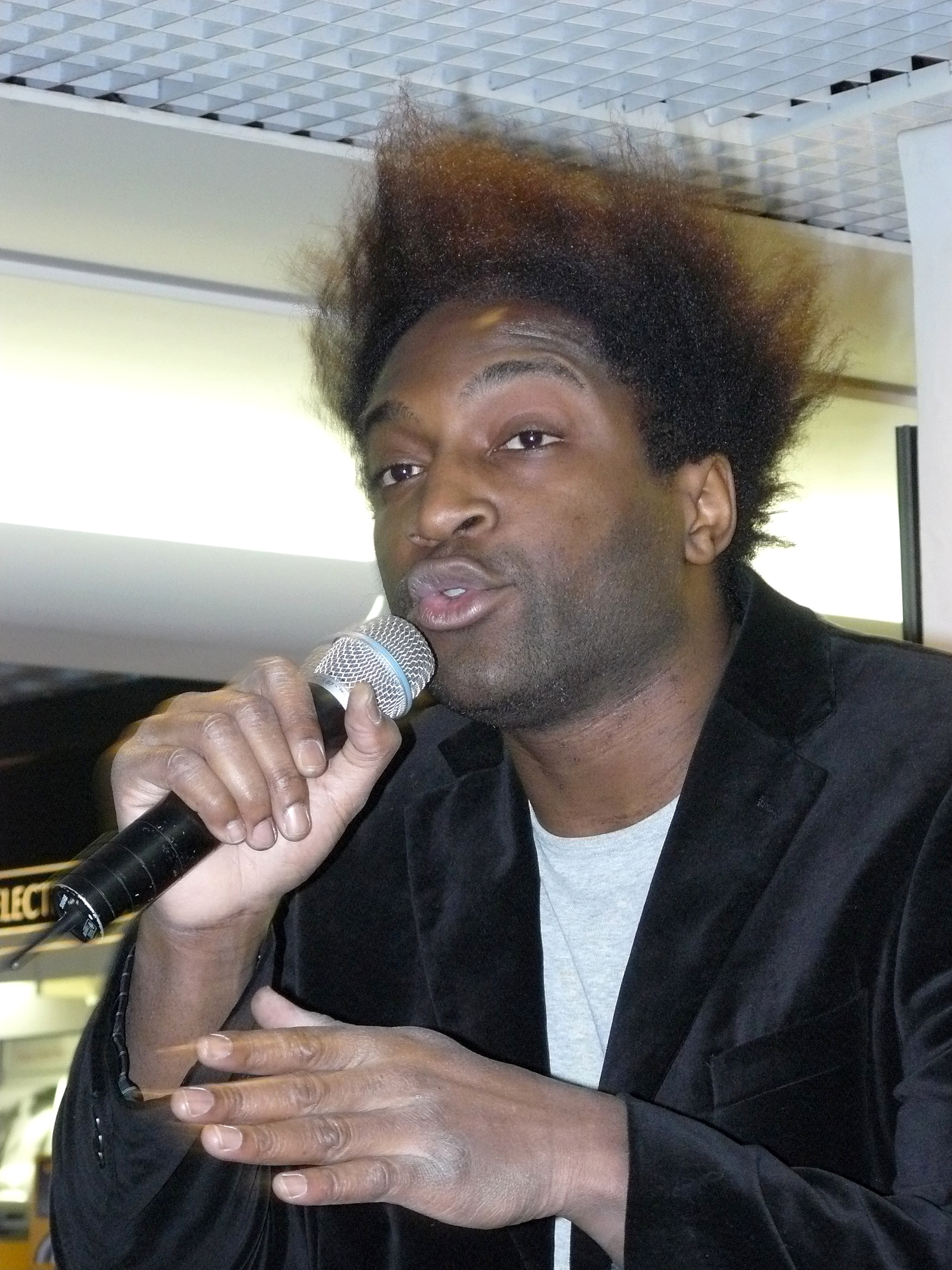
- Kamini promoting Extraterrien in Feb 2010
- Born: Kamini Zantoko; Le Nouvion-en-Thiérache, Aisne, France
- Occupations: Musician, screenwriter
- Musical career
- Origin: Marly-Gomont, France
- Genres: Hip hop
- Years active: 2006-present
- Label: RCA

Kamini Zantoko is a Black French musician and screenwriter.

== Personal life ==
Kamini's father—Seyolo Zantoko—and his family moved from Zaire to Marly-Gomont, France in 1975. They had difficulty assimilating as the first Black people in town. Kamini was born in Le Nouvion-en-Thiérache, grew up in Marly-Gomont, and by the summer of 2006, was working part-time as a nurse. Seyolo died sometime prior to 2012.

== Career ==
Aspiring to make hip hop music, in 2006 he wrote about Marly-Gomont ("Marly-Gomont"). In his music video, made in late June on a budget of €100 (equivalent to €125 in 2022), he raps about farming and games with his friends and fellow villagers. On 30 August, Kamini uploaded the video and cold-emailed promotions to record companies; instead, a t-shirt retailer shared the link online, and by the end of the day, "Marly-Gomont" was a hit. Off the merits of his amateur viral video, Kamini signed with RCA Records on 2 November to publish "Marly-Gomont" and two more albums. In August 2019, he released a music video, "J'avais envie de le dire".

In 2012, Kamini wrote and narrated the autobiographical film The African Doctor (French: Bienvenue à Marly-Gomont, lit. 'Welcome to Marly-Gomont') to pay tribute to his father. It was released in 2016, directed by Julien Rambaldi.

After film, Kamini went on to work in television. He has presented and reported for several programs, including Toute la Picardie vous ouverte les portes de la formation, Midi en France in 2016, and Les Gens des Hauts on France 3 in November 2017. In 2021 on France 2's Un si grand soleil, he portrayed Wilson Samba, a diamond trafficker.
