= The African Doctor =

- Theatrical release poster
- Bienvenue à Marly-Gomont
- Directed by: Julien Rambaldi
- Screenplay by: Julien Rambaldi; Kamini; Benoît Graffin
- Produced by: Pauline Duhault; Olivier Delbosc; Marc Missonnier
- Starring: Marc Zinga; Aïssa Maïga
- Cinematography: Yannick Ressigeac
- Edited by: Stephane Pereira
- Music by: Emmanuel Rambaldi
- Production companies: E.D.I. Films; Moana Films; Curiosa Films; Cinéfrance; TF1 Films Production
- Distributed by: Mars Films
- Release date: 8 June 2016
- Running time: 96 minutes
- Country: France
- Language: French
- Box office: $4.4 million

The African Doctor (original title: Bienvenue à Marly-Gomont) is a 2016 French comedy-drama film based on the life of Seyolo Zantoko, the father of the musician Kamini. It was co-written by Kamini and directed by Julien Rambaldi. It stars Marc Zinga and Aïssa Maïga.

== Plot ==
In 1975, Seyolo Zantoko graduates from medical school in Lille; he was the only African man in his class and circle of friends. He turns down a job in Zaire as the personal physician of President Joseph-Desiré Mobutu, as he wants to avoid the corruption associated with his country. Instead, he is hired by the mayor of Marly-Gomont, a small village in northern France. He calls his family and informs them that he got a job in France; in their excitement, his wife Anne and their two children, Sivi and Kamini, assume that they will move to Paris. They are soon disappointed to learn that they are living in a rural village. Seyolo's decision to live in France is primarily motivated by providing a better education for his children; he also hopes to apply for French citizenship.

The Zantoko family struggle to adapt to their new life in Marly-Gomont. The locals have never seen black people before and initially treat them with fear and distrust; Sivi and Kamini are bullied at school and Seyolo's practice struggles to thrive as the locals prefer to go to the French doctor in the neighbouring village. Seyolo and Anne have a heated argument in front of visiting relatives, during which Seyolo reluctantly promises that they will eventually move to Brussels, where the aforementioned relatives live. However, Seyolo and his family end up gaining the trust of the villagers after he successfully delivers the baby of a local farmer. More people visit his practice which becomes a success.

Seyolo, Sivi and Kamini begin to feel more at home in Marly-Gomont, though Anne still wishes to move to Brussels. Seyolo tells the mayor that he wishes to stay in the village for the long term. That same evening, the mayor and his wife have dinner at the Zantokos' house, and the mayor mentions his happiness that Seyolo will remain as the village's doctor. Anne is angered by this revelation as Seyolo had not told her about accepting the mayor's request to stay in Marly-Gomont. Anne leaves to stay in Brussels with her family and the couple's relationship is in jeopardy.

Sometime later, Seyolo is arrested by the French police for immigration irregularities, days before his French citizenship application is approved. The only hope for Seyolo to continue his practice is that the current mayor will be re-elected, although his opponent, Lavigne, is leading the polls and is determined to hire a doctor of French origin. Meanwhile, Sivi demonstrates her talent in soccer and wins the hearts of the community, helping to defeat the opposing team in the local soccer league. Seyolo and his children devise a plan to show the villagers that if Lavigne wins the election, the Zantokos will have to move. The locals, realizing that they will lose the doctor and their best soccer player, agree to vote for the incumbent mayor.

Anne returns to Marly-Gomont and joins her husband in watching a school play that their children are performing in. They discover that the play is a re-enactment of the arrival and eventual acceptance of the Zantoko family. They realize that they are loved by the entire community (except Lavigne, who leaves before the end of the show). The mayor is re-elected, Seyolo's office reopens, and Anne is hired as his secretary. They remain happily married until 2009 when Seyolo passes away in a car accident. His funeral is attended by the entire village.

In the epilogue, it states that Seyolo had received the medal of merit in 2008 for service to Picardy. After his death, Anne moved to Brussels to join her cousins. Sivi and Kamini both graduated with nursing degrees; the former practices in Brussels while the latter became a comedian. In 2006, Kamini made his village famous with his hit song 'Marly-Gomont', which is played in the closing credits.

== Cast ==
- Marc Zinga as Seyolo Zantoko
- Aïssa Maïga as Anne Zantoko
- Bayron Lebli as Kamini Zantoko
- Médina Diarra as Sivi Zantoko
- Rufus as Jean
- Jonathan Lambert as Lavigne
- Mata Gabin as Mado
- Sylvestre Amoussou as Uncle Beki
- Riton Liebman as The Driving Teacher
- Stephane Bissot as Madame Quinquin
- Marie-Philomene Nga as Tantine Baheta
- Narcisse Mame as Jack
- Jean Bediebe as Tonton Baheta
- Stephanie Crayencour as Rosa
- Vincent Martin as Bernard
- Ingrid Heiderscheidt as Mireille
- Jovial Mbenga as Kamini (adult)
- Emilie Rouhart as Sylvie
- Mutamba Kalonji as Jorcelin

== See also ==
- Marly-Gomont (song), Kamini's ode to the small, rural village in Northern France where he grew up, Marly-Gomont. In the song, Kamini laments being from the only black family in town. The song became an Internet phenomenon and a number-one single in France.
