= 1979 in British music =

This is a summary of 1979 in music in the United Kingdom, including the official charts from that year. 1979 saw the beginning of several trends in British music. Electropop reached number one in both the singles and albums charts in the form of Gary Numan and Tubeway Army, and synthesiser bands began to gather momentum, which would come to dominate music in the early 1980s. The first rap hit in the UK came from the Sugar Hill Gang. The 2 Tone movement also emerged, with early work from bands such as The Specials and Madness. Disco music was still the most popular music of the year, although it showed signs of dying out in the year's later months. 1979 remains the year when physical-format singles hit their sales peak in the UK.

== Events ==
- 23 February – Dire Straits begin their first American tour, in Boston.
- 27 March – Eric Clapton marries Patti Boyd, ex-wife of Clapton's friend George Harrison.
- 31 March – In the Eurovision Song Contest, UK representatives Black Lace finish seventh.
- 2 April – Kate Bush begins her first live tour, The Tour of Life. It remains her only tour, and would be her only live shows for 35 years until her Before the Dawn shows at the Hammersmith Apollo in 2014.
- 6 April – Rod Stewart marries Alana Hamilton.
- 1 May – Elton John becomes the first overseas pop music artist to perform in Israel.
- 2 May – The Who perform their first concert following the death of drummer Keith Moon. The band performed with new drummer Kenney Jones.
- 11 August – Led Zeppelin play their last ever British concert at Knebworth in Hertfordshire.
- 21 August – Cliff Richard achieves his tenth UK number-one with "We Don't Talk Anymore", his first chart-topper in more than 11 years.
- August – Brotherhood of Man members Martin Lee and Sandra Stevens marry.
- 26 November – Bill Haley & His Comets perform at the Drury Lane Theatre in London in a command performance for the Queen. This was Haley's final recorded performance of "Rock Around the Clock".
- date unknown
  - The Welsh Philharmonia becomes the Orchestra of Welsh National Opera.
  - Richard Rodney Bennett becomes a resident of New York City.
  - Arthur Oldham founds the Concertgebouw Orchestra Chorus in Amsterdam.

== Charts ==
=== Number one singles ===
| Date | Song | Artist |
|---|---|---|
| 6 January | "Y.M.C.A." | Village People |
| 13 January | "Y.M.C.A." | Village People |
| 20 January | "Y.M.C.A." | Village People |
| 27 January | "Hit Me With Your Rhythm Stick" | Ian Dury and the Blockheads |
| 3 February | "Heart of Glass" | Blondie |
| 10 February | "Heart of Glass" | Blondie |
| 17 February | "Heart of Glass" | Blondie |
| 24 February | "Heart of Glass" | Blondie |
| 3 March | "Tragedy" | Bee Gees |
| 10 March | "Tragedy" | Bee Gees |
| 17 March | "I Will Survive" | Gloria Gaynor |
| 24 March | "I Will Survive" | Gloria Gaynor |
| 31 March | "I Will Survive" | Gloria Gaynor |
| 7 April | "I Will Survive" | Gloria Gaynor |
| 14 April | "Bright Eyes" | Art Garfunkel |
| 21 April | "Bright Eyes" | Art Garfunkel |
| 28 April | "Bright Eyes" | Art Garfunkel |
| 5 May | "Bright Eyes" | Art Garfunkel |
| 12 May | "Bright Eyes" | Art Garfunkel |
| 19 May | "Bright Eyes" | Art Garfunkel |
| 26 May | "Sunday Girl" | Blondie |
| 2 June | "Sunday Girl" | Blondie |
| 9 June | "Sunday Girl" | Blondie |
| 16 June | "Ring My Bell" | Anita Ward |
| 23 June | "Ring My Bell" | Anita Ward |
| 30 June | "Are 'Friends' Electric?" | Tubeway Army |
| 7 July | "Are 'Friends' Electric?" | Tubeway Army |
| 14 July | "Are 'Friends' Electric?" | Tubeway Army |
| 21 July | "Are 'Friends' Electric?" | Tubeway Army |
| 28 July | "I Don't Like Mondays" | The Boomtown Rats |
| 4 August | "I Don't Like Mondays" | The Boomtown Rats |
| 11 August | "I Don't Like Mondays" | The Boomtown Rats |
| 18 August | "I Don't Like Mondays" | The Boomtown Rats |
| 25 August | "We Don't Talk Anymore" | Cliff Richard |
| 1 September | "We Don't Talk Anymore" | Cliff Richard |
| 8 September | "We Don't Talk Anymore" | Cliff Richard |
| 15 September | "We Don't Talk Anymore" | Cliff Richard |
| 22 September | "Cars" | Gary Numan |
| 29 September | "Message in a Bottle" | The Police |
| 6 October | "Message in a Bottle" | The Police |
| 13 October | "Message in a Bottle" | The Police |
| 20 October | "Video Killed the Radio Star" | The Buggles |
| 27 October | "One Day at a Time" | Lena Martell |
| 3 November | "One Day at a Time" | Lena Martell |
| 10 November | "One Day at a Time" | Lena Martell |
| 17 November | "When You're in Love with a Beautiful Woman" | Dr. Hook |
| 24 November | "When You're in Love with a Beautiful Woman" | Dr. Hook |
| 1 December | "When You're in Love with a Beautiful Woman" | Dr. Hook |
| 8 December | "Walking on the Moon" | The Police |
| 15 December | "Another Brick in the Wall Part II" | Pink Floyd |
| 22 December | "Another Brick in the Wall Part II" | Pink Floyd |
| 29 December | "Another Brick in the Wall Part II" | Pink Floyd |

=== Number one albums ===
| Date | Album | Artist | Weeks |
|---|---|---|---|
| 6 January | Greatest Hits | Showaddywaddy | 2 |
| 13 January | Greatest Hits | Showaddywaddy | 2 |
| 20 January | Don't Walk – Boogie | Various Artists | 3 |
| 27 January | Don't Walk – Boogie | Various Artists | 3 |
| 3 February | Don't Walk – Boogie | Various Artists | 3 |
| 10 February | Action Replay | Various Artists | 1 |
| 17 February | Parallel Lines | Blondie | 4 |
| 24 February | Parallel Lines | Blondie | 4 |
| 3 March | Parallel Lines | Blondie | 4 |
| 10 March | Parallel Lines | Blondie | 4 |
| 17 March | Spirits Having Flown | Bee Gees | 2 |
| 24 March | Spirits Having Flown | Bee Gees | 2 |
| 31 March | Barbra Streisand's Greatest Hits Vol. 2 | Barbra Streisand | 4 |
| 7 April | Barbra Streisand's Greatest Hits Vol. 2 | Barbra Streisand | 4 |
| 14 April | Barbra Streisand's Greatest Hits Vol. 2 | Barbra Streisand | 4 |
| 21 April | Barbra Streisand's Greatest Hits Vol. 2 | Barbra Streisand | 4 |
| 28 April | The Very Best of Leo Sayer | Leo Sayer | 3 |
| 5 May | The Very Best of Leo Sayer | Leo Sayer | 3 |
| 12 May | The Very Best of Leo Sayer | Leo Sayer | 3 |
| 19 May | Voulez-Vous | ABBA | 4 |
| 26 May | Voulez-Vous | ABBA | 4 |
| 2 June | Voulez-Vous | ABBA | 4 |
| 9 June | Voulez-Vous | ABBA | 4 |
| 16 June | Discovery | Electric Light Orchestra | 5 |
| 23 June | Discovery | Electric Light Orchestra | 5 |
| 30 June | Discovery | Electric Light Orchestra | 5 |
| 7 July | Discovery | Electric Light Orchestra | 5 |
| 14 July | Discovery | Electric Light Orchestra | 5 |
| 21 July | Replicas | Tubeway Army | 1 |
| 28 July | The Best Disco Album in the World | Various Artists | 6 |
| 4 August | The Best Disco Album in the World | Various Artists | 6 |
| 11 August | The Best Disco Album in the World | Various Artists | 6 |
| 18 August | The Best Disco Album in the World | Various Artists | 6 |
| 25 August | The Best Disco Album in the World | Various Artists | 6 |
| 1 September | The Best Disco Album in the World | Various Artists | 6 |
| 8 September | In Through the Out Door | Led Zeppelin | 2 |
| 15 September | In Through the Out Door | Led Zeppelin | 2 |
| 22 September | The Pleasure Principle | Gary Numan | 1 |
| 29 September | Oceans of Fantasy | Boney M | 1 |
| 6 October | The Pleasure Principle | Gary Numan | 1 |
| =13 October | Eat to the Beat | Blondie | 1 |
| =13 October | Reggatta de Blanc | The Police | 4 |
| 20 October | Reggatta de Blanc | The Police | 4 |
| 27 October | Reggatta de Blanc | The Police | 4 |
| 3 November | Reggatta de Blanc | The Police | 4 |
| 10 November | Tusk | Fleetwood Mac | 1 |
| 17 November | Greatest Hits Vol. 2 | ABBA | 3 |
| 24 November | Greatest Hits Vol. 2 | ABBA | 3 |
| 1 December | Greatest Hits Vol. 2 | ABBA | 3 |
| 8 December | Greatest Hits Vol.1 | Rod Stewart | 4 |
| 15 December | Greatest Hits Vol.1 | Rod Stewart | 4 |
| 22 December | Greatest Hits Vol.1 | Rod Stewart | 4 |
| 29 December | Greatest Hits Vol.1 | Rod Stewart | 4 |

== Year-end charts ==
1979 appears to be the only year since 1977 for which "full year" year-end charts do not exist. The British Market Research Bureau (BMRB), which compiled the official UK charts from 1969 to 1982, used a cut-off date for the collection of sales data sometime in early December each year, in order for the "end of year" chart to be published in the year's final issue of Music Week and to be broadcast on BBC Radio 1. However, from 1977 to 1982, BMRB produced updated charts a few months later, which included the missing final weeks' sales for each year.

No updated chart appears to exist for 1979, so the tables below include only sales between 1 January and 8 December 1979. The two singles most affected by the lack of a full year chart are the records that were at number one and number two for the final three weeks of the year, "Another Brick in the Wall (Part 2)" by Pink Floyd and "I Have a Dream" by ABBA: neither of these records appear in the end of year list for 1979.

=== Best-selling singles ===
| No. | Title | Artist | Peak position |
|---|---|---|---|
| 1 | "Bright Eyes" | Art Garfunkel | 1 |
| 2 | "Heart of Glass" | Blondie | 1 |
| 3 | "We Don't Talk Anymore" | Cliff Richard | 1 |
| 4 | "I Don't Like Mondays" | The Boomtown Rats | 1 |
| 5 | "When You're in Love with a Beautiful Woman" | Dr. Hook | 1 |
| 6 | "I Will Survive" | Gloria Gaynor | 1 |
| 7 | "Are Friends Electric" | Tubeway Army | 1 |
| 8 | "Dance Away" | Roxy Music | 2 |
| 9 | "Sunday Girl" | Blondie | 1 |
| 10 | "One Day at a Time" | Lena Martell | 1 |
| 11 | "Message in a Bottle" | The Police | 1 |
| 12 | "Pop Muzik" | M | 2 |
| 13 | "Hit Me with Your Rhythm Stick" | Ian Dury and the Blockheads | 1 |
| 14 | "Oliver's Army" | Elvis Costello and the Attractions | 2 |
| 15 | "Tragedy" | Bee Gees | 1 |
| 16 | "Chiquitita" | ABBA | 2 |
| 17 | "Video Killed the Radio Star" | The Buggles | 1 |
| 18 | "Cars" | Gary Numan | 1 |
| 19 | "Every Day Hurts" | Sad Café | 3 |
| 20 | "Ring My Bell" | Anita Ward | 1 |
| 21 | "Some Girls" | Racey | 2 |
| 22 | "Boogie Wonderland" | Earth, Wind & Fire with the Emotions | 4 |
| 23 | "Don't Stop 'Til You Get Enough" | Michael Jackson | 3 |
| 24 | "Woman in Love" | The Three Degrees | 3 |
| 25 | "Crazy Little Thing Called Love" | Queen | 2 |
| 26 | "Y.M.C.A." | Village People | 1 |
| 27 | "Reunited" | Peaches and Herb | 4 |
| 28 | "Gimme! Gimme! Gimme! (A Man After Midnight)" | ABBA | 3 |
| 29 | "Lucky Number" | Lene Lovich | 3 |
| 30 | "If I Said You Had a Beautiful Body Would You Hold It Against Me" | The Bellamy Brothers | 3 |
| 31 | "Cool for Cats" | Squeeze | 2 |
| 32 | "Something Else"/"Friggin' in the Riggin'" | Sex Pistols | 3 |
| 33 | "Silly Games" | Janet Kay | 2 |
| 34 | "Bang Bang" | B. A. Robertson | 2 |
| 35 | "Dreaming" | Blondie | 2 |
| 36 | "Wanted" | The Dooleys | 3 |
| 37 | "Can You Feel the Force?" | The Real Thing | 5 |
| 38 | "Knock on Wood" | Amii Stewart | 6 |
| 39 | "Contact" | Edwin Starr | 6 |
| 40 | "I Want Your Love" | Chic | 4 |
| 41 | "Hooray! Hooray! It's a Holi-Holiday" | Boney M | 3 |
| 42 | "Theme from The Deer Hunter (Cavatina)" | The Shadows | 9 |
| 43 | "Does Your Mother Know" | ABBA | 4 |
| 44 | "Shake Your Body (Down to the Ground)" | The Jacksons | 4 |
| 45 | "Since You've Been Gone" | Rainbow | 6 |
| 46 | "Up the Junction" | Squeeze | 2 |
| 47 | "Love's Gotta Hold on Me" | Dollar | 4 |
| 48 | "Still" | The Commodores | 4 |
| 49 | "In the Navy" | Village People | 2 |
| 50 | "Whatever You Want" | Status Quo | 4 |

=== Best-selling albums ===
| No. | Title | Artist | Peak position |
|---|---|---|---|
| 1 | Parallel Lines | Blondie | 1 |
| 2 | Discovery | Electric Light Orchestra | 1 |
| 3 | The Very Best of Leo Sayer | Leo Sayer | 1 |
| 4 | Breakfast in America | Supertramp | 3 |
| 5 | Voulez-Vous | ABBA | 1 |
| 6 | Barbra Streisand's Greatest Hits Vol. 2 | Barbra Streisand | 1 |
| 7 | Spirits Having Flown | Bee Gees | 1 |
| 8 | Greatest Hits Vol. 2 | ABBA | 1 |
| 9 | Reggatta de Blanc | The Police | 1 |
| 10 | Manilow Magic: The Best of Barry Manilow | Barry Manilow | 3 |
| 11 | Greatest Hits | Rod Stewart | 1 |
| 12 | Last the Whole Night Long | James Last | 2 |
| 13 | Armed Forces | Elvis Costello and the Attractions | 2 |
| 14 | Outlandos d'Amour | The Police | 6 |
| 15 | The Best Disco Album in the World | Various Artists | 1 |
| 16 | Replicas | Tubeway Army | 1 |
| 17 | I Am | Earth, Wind & Fire | 5 |
| 18 | C'est Chic | Chic | 2 |
| 19 | Dire Straits | Dire Straits | 5 |
| 20 | Manifesto | Roxy Music | 7 |
| 21 | Eat to the Beat | Blondie | 1 |
| 22 | Jeff Wayne's Musical Version of The War of the Worlds | Jeff Wayne | 12 (Note: Reached number 5 in 1978) |
| 23 | Bat Out of Hell | Meat Loaf | 11 (Note: Reached number 9 in 1981) |
| 24 | Do It Yourself | Ian Dury and the Blockheads | 2 |
| 25 | Tusk | Fleetwood Mac | 1 |
| 26 | Out of the Blue | Electric Light Orchestra | 13 (Note: Reached number 4 in 1977) |
| 27 | New Boots and Panties!! | Ian Dury | 5 |
| 28 | 20 Golden Greats | Diana Ross | 2 |
| 29 | Night Owl | Gerry Rafferty | 9 |
| 30 | Don't Walk – Boogie | Various Artists | 1 |
| 31 | Fate for Breakfast | Art Garfunkel | 2 |
| 32 | The Best of Earth, Wind & Fire, Vol. 1 | Earth, Wind & Fire | 6 |
| 33 | Black Rose: A Rock Legend | Thin Lizzy | 2 |
| 34 | The Pleasure Principle | Gary Numan | 1 |
| 35 | Action Replay | Various Artists | 1 |
| 36 | In Through the Out Door | Led Zeppelin | 1 |
| 37 | The Great Rock and Roll Swindle | Sex Pistols | 7 |
| 38 | String of Hits | The Shadows | 4 (Note: Reached number 1 in 1980) |
| 39 | Live Killers | Queen | 3 |
| 40 | Lodger | David Bowie | 4 |
| 41 | A Collection of Their 20 Greatest Hits | The Three Degrees | 8 |
| 42 | Nightflight to Venus | Boney M | 1 |
| 43 | Wings Greatest | Wings | 5 |
| 44 | Sky | Sky | 9 |
| 45 | Off the Wall | Michael Jackson | 5 |
| 46 | Bridges | John Williams | 5 |
| 47 | Lionheart | Kate Bush | 12 (Note: Reached number 6 in 1978) |
| 48 | Blondes Have More Fun | Rod Stewart | 7 (Note: Reached number 3 in 1978) |
| 49 | Bob Dylan at Budokan | Bob Dylan | 4 |
| 50 | Country Life | Various Artists | 2 |

== Classical music: new works ==
- William Lloyd Webber – Missa Sanctae Mariae Magdalenae
- Malcolm Williamson – Symphony No. 5 – Aquerò

== Opera ==
- Peter Maxwell Davies – The Lighthouse

== Film and Incidental music ==
- Richard Rodney Bennett – Yanks directed by John Schlesinger, starring Richard Gere and Vanessa Redgrave.
- Geoffrey Burgon – Monty Python's Life of Brian.

== Musical theatre ==
- Andrew Lloyd Webber – Tell Me on a Sunday
- Stephen Sondheim & Hugh Wheeler – Sweeney Todd: The Demon Barber of Fleet Street (premièred on Broadway)

== Musical films ==
- The Music Machine
- The Who – Quadrophenia

== Births ==
- 5 January
  - Steve Scott-Lee, singer (3SL)
  - Michelle Barber, singer (Girl Thing)
- 19 January – Wiley, record producer and MC
- 20 January – Will Young, singer and winner of Pop Idol (series 1)
- 23 January – Vicky Dowdall, singer (Girls@Play)
- 8 March – Tom Chaplin, singer (Keane)
- 12 March – Pete Doherty, singer and guitarist (The Libertines and Babyshambles)
- 30 March – Simon Webbe, singer (Blue)
- 10 April – Sophie Ellis-Bextor, singer
- 11 April
  - Paul Byrom, Irish tenor
  - Lee Otter, singer (North and South)
- 13 April – Tony Lundon, Irish singer (Liberty X)
- 29 April
  - Jo O'Meara, singer (S Club 7)
  - Matt Tong (Bloc Party)
- 3 May – Danny Foster, singer (Hear'Say)
- 23 May – Lisa-Jay White, singer (Girls@Play)
- 31 May – Sarah Class, composer
- 8 June – Adam de la Cour, musician and composer
- 29 June – Abz Love, singer (5ive)
- 4 July – Nikki Stuart, singer (Girl Thing)
- 5 July – Shane Filan, Irish singer (Westlife)
- 19 July – Michelle Heaton, singer (Liberty X)
- 20 July – Charlotte Hatherley, singer-songwriter and guitarist (Ash and Nightnurse)
- 21 July – Tommy Clark, singer (Mero)
- 20 August – Jamie Cullum, jazz pianist and singer
- 23 August – Ritchie Neville, singer (5ive)
- 5 September – Garry O'Meara, Irish singer (Reel)
- 8 October – Alexander Shelley, conductor
- 22 November – Scott Robinson, singer (5ive)
- 28 November – Dane Bowers, singer (Another Level, 5th Story)
- 3 December
  - Daniel Bedingfield, New Zealand-born pop singer and songwriter
  - Kerri Ann, Irish singer
- 15 December – Edele and Keavy Lynch, Irish singers (B*Witched)
- date unknown
  - Mark Bowden, Welsh-born composer
  - Emily Howard, composer

== Deaths ==
- 2 February – Sid Vicious, punk rocker, 21 (drug overdose)
- 4 March – Mike Patto, rock vocalist, 36 (throat cancer)
- 24 May – Sir Ernest Bullock, organist and composer, 88
- 16 July – Alfred Deller, countertenor, 67
- 25 August – Stan Kenton, bandleader, 67
- 4 September – Guy Bolton, librettist, 94
- 6 September – Ronald Binge, composer and arranger, 69
- 9 September – Norrie Paramor, record producer, composer, arranger, and orchestral conductor, 65
- 27 September – Gracie Fields, actress and singer, 81
- 13 October – Rebecca Helferich Clarke, viola player and composer, 93
- 6 November – Hugh Ottaway, music writer, 54
- 30 November – Joyce Grenfell, actress and musical performer, 69
- December – Terence Judd, pianist, 22 (probable suicide)
- 21 December – Nansi Richards, harpist, 91

== See also ==
- 1979 in British radio
- 1979 in British television
- 1979 in the United Kingdom
- List of British films of 1979
