= Glowing eyes =

Glowing eyes can refer to:

- Tapetum lucidum, a layer of tissue in the eye that reflects visible light back through the retina
- Glowing Eyes (film), a 2002 French film
- "Glowing Eyes", a song by Twenty One Pilots from their album Regional at Best, later rereleased on the bonus tracks version of the album Vessel
