= Café de la plage =

2001 film by Benoît Graffin

- Directed by: Benoît Graffin
- Written by: Benoît Graffin; André Téchiné; Mohammed Mrabet; Paul Bowles
- Produced by: Cyriac Auriol; Pauline Duhault
- Starring: Jacques Nolot; Ouassini Embarek; Leïla Belarbi; Delia Amrani
- Cinematography: Yorick Le Saux
- Edited by: Camille Cotte
- Music by: Philippe Miller
- Release date: 13 September 2001 (TIFF)
- Running time: 83 minutes
- Country: France
- Language: French

Café de la plage is a 2001 French film written and directed by Benoît Graffin. The film stars Jacques Nolot, Ouassini Embarek, Leïla Belarbi, Delia Amrani, Meryem Serbah, Mohamed El Hasnaoui, Abdelaziz Semlali, Hind Ramdi.
