= Marly-Gomont =

- Commune
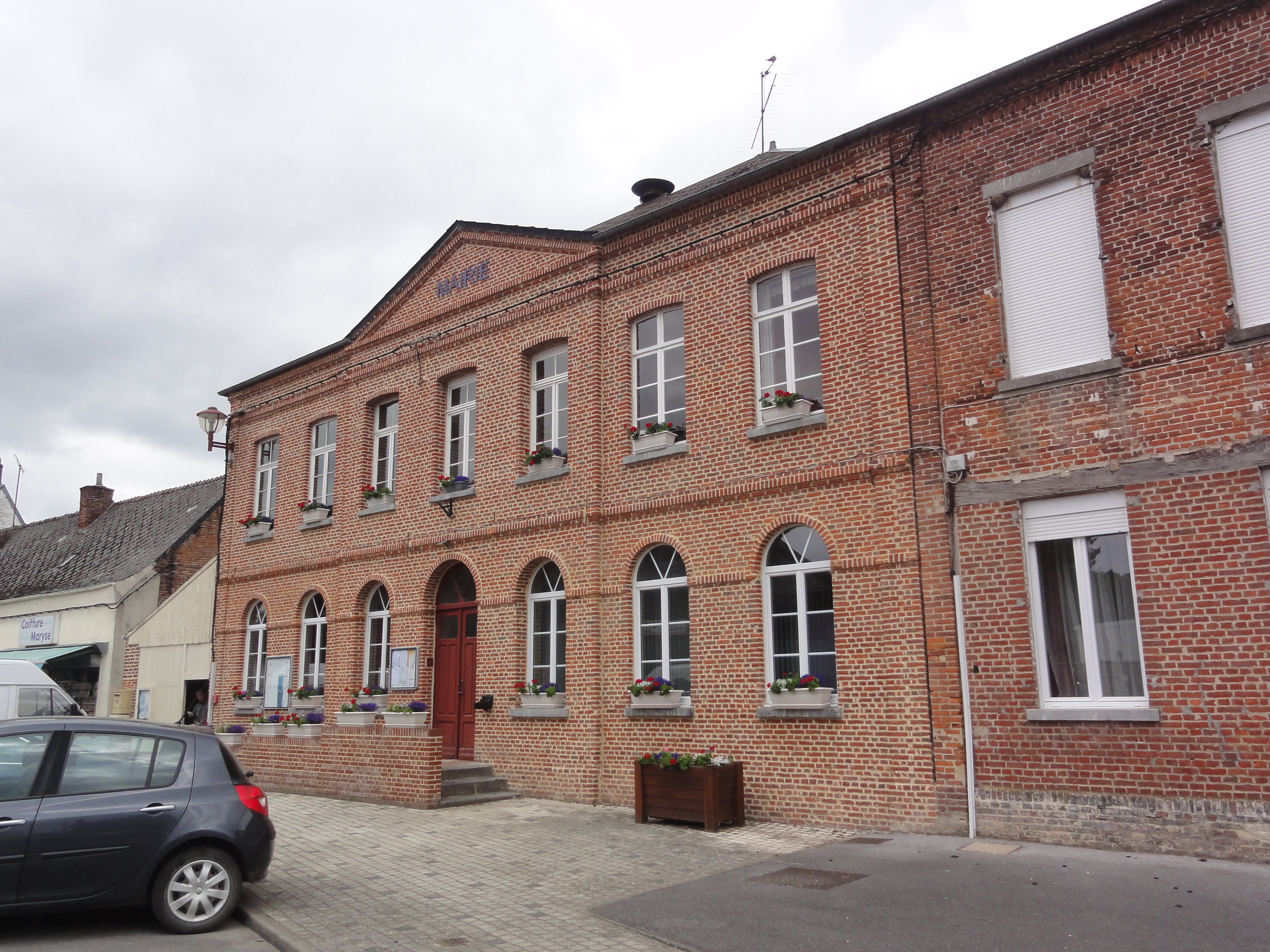
- The town hall of Marly-Gomont

- Coat of arms
- Location of Marly-Gomont
- Location within France Location within Hauts-de-France
- Coordinates: 49°54′19″N 3°47′33″E
- Country: France
- Region: Hauts-de-France
- Department: Aisne
- Arrondissement: Vervins
- Canton: Guise

Government
  - Mayor (2026–32): Maryse Delache
- Area^{1}: 12.91 km^{2} (4.98 sq mi)
- Highest elevation: 184 m (604 ft)
- Lowest elevation: 107 m (351 ft)
- Population (2023): 483
  - Density: 37.4/km^{2} (96.9/sq mi)
- Demonym(s): Marlysien, Marlysienne
- Time zone: UTC+01:00 (CET)
  - Summer (DST): UTC+02:00 (CEST)
- INSEE/Postal code: 02469 /02120
- ^{1} French Land Register data, which excludes lakes, ponds, glaciers > 1 km^{2} (0.386 sq mi or 247 acres) and river estuaries.

Marly-Gomont (French pronunciation: [maʁli ɡɔmɔ̃]) is a commune in the Aisne department, administrative region of Hauts-de-France (formerly Picardy), northern France.

== Population ==
Historical population
Year	Pop.	±% p.a.
1968	551	—
1975	507	−1.18%
1982	420	−2.65%
1990	464	+1.25%
1999	429	−0.87%
2007	419	−0.29%
2012	435	+0.75%
2017	475	+1.77%
2023	483	+0.28%
Source: INSEE

== Personalities ==
- A song by the rapper Kamini depicts Marly-Gomont.^{video} The video received almost 16 million hits since it was posted on the YouTube website in September 2006. Since then, a film based on the true story of Kamini's father immigrating to the town was produced in 2016 called Bienvenue à Marly-Gomont ("Welcome to Marly-Gomont"), in French, or The African Doctor, for anglophone audiences.

== See also ==
- Communes of the Aisne department
