= Jacques Nolot =

French actor, screenwriter and film director

- Born: 31 August 1943 (age 82); Marciac, Gers, France
- Occupation: Filmmaker
- Years active: 1981–present

Jacques Nolot (French: [nɔlo]; born 31 August 1943) is a French actor, screenwriter and film director.

== Life and career ==
Jacques Nolot was born on 31 August 1943, Marciac, Gers, a small village in Southwest France. A fragile child, Nolot was doted upon by his mother, a woman who had three children with three different men. An illegitimate child, Nolot's family environment was troublesome and from an early age he wanted to run away from home. "The sole elegance my parents had was to allow me to leave. And then to die quickly" he later explained in an interview. At age 16, he was working at the village's grocery store, when a tourist stopping there offered him to take him to Paris. In the French capital, he worked selling vegetables while taking acting classes. At age seventeen, he decided to move to Cannes in order to become a star. Young and without economical resources, he became the lover of a rich woman and later began hustling for men. His life was the street.

At age nineteen, he met Roland Barthes, who was more than twenty years his senior. They became lovers. Barthes introduced him to Parisian intellectuals among them André Téchiné. In the 1980s and 1990s Nolot took small roles in some of Téchiné's films beginning with Hotel America (1981). He performed in many other films including Long Live Life (1984), Scene of the Crime (1986), Les Innocents (1987) or Nénette and Boni (1996). As an actor, he is best remembered for his role as Charlotte Rampling's lover in François Ozon's Under the Sand (2000).

Nolot recounted his restless youth in his unpublished novel The First Step, (Le Premier pas). Nolot and Téchiné converted the story in the screenplay for Téchiné's 1991 film, I don't kiss (J'embrasse pas). Since then Nolot has written stories with strong auto biographic elements. His first play, La matiouette ou l'arrière-pays, grew up out of a night of improvisation with two friends that was recorded on an audio cassette and then transcribed by hand. It was adapted to the screen by Téchiné in 1983.

In 1986, Nolot wrote, directed, and acted in the short film Manège that would be the genesis for his later feature film Porn Theater (2002). He wrote and starred in a second short: Le café des Jules (1989), directed by Paul Vecchiali.

Nolot made his first feature film Hinterland (1998) LArriere pays, the film written by Nolot, was initially going to be directed by Claire Denis, but when the project with Denis fell through, he took the direction of the film's original title translate as the Back Country and makes reference to Nolot's rural village where he grew up. The plot follows the story of a man who returns to his rural hometown for the final hour of his mother's life and her subsequent funeral. Coming back as a city man, he is a stranger to both his father, who always relied on his bastard son's money without wanting to know where it came from, and his brother, a macho womanizer. Hinterland won the First Film Special Distinction Award at the Montreal World Film Festival and a FIPRESCI Special Mention Award at the Venice Film Festival both in 1998. Nolot earned a nomination for Best New Director of a Feature Film at the César Awards in 1999.

In 2000 while working in Benoît Graffin's Café de la plage (2001), the actor had a heart attack and fell into coma. He finished the film after his complete recovery. Nolot's second film Porn theater chatte à deux têtes was screened in the Un Certain Regard section at the 2002 Cannes Film Festival. La chatte à deux tête (2002), shot entirely in a Paris movie theater was critically well received. In his third film Before I Forget (Avant que j'oublie) Nolot portrays an aging HIV positive, a hustler in his youth who now in a reversal of roles has to pay for sex.

== Filmography ==
=== As actor ===
- Hôtel des Amériques (1981)
- The Passerby (1982)
- One Deadly Summer (1983), Fiero
- La matiouette ou l'arrière-pays (1984), Alain Pruez
- Viva la vie (1984), Inspector
- Hell Train (1985)
- Les Spécialistes (1985), Le gendarme chez Laura
- Rendez-vous (1985), Max
- Scene of the Crime (1986), Le Père Sorbier
- Les Innocents (1987), Docteur
- My Favorite Season (1993), L'homme du cimetière
- Wild Reeds (1994), Monsieur Morelli
- I Can't Sleep (1994), Le spectateur au cinéma
- Nénette et Boni (1996), Monsieur Luminaire
- Les Grands Ducs (1996), Francis Moreau
- Artemisia (1997), The Lawyer
- Sous le sable (2000), Vincent
- Café de la plage (2001), Fouad
- Glowing Eyes (2002), 50-Year-Old Man
- To Paint or Make Love (2005), Michel
- The Witnesses (2007), Le patron de l'hôtel
- Before I Forget (2007), Pierre Pruez
- Happy End (2009), Docteur Abeberry
- House of Tolerance (2011),
- Smugglers' Songs (2011), Le marquis
- Farewell, My Queen (2012), Monsieur de Jolivet
- Gare du Nord (2013), Mario
- Thirst Street (2017), Franz
- South Terminal (2019)
- Everything Went Fine (2021)

=== As film director ===
- Hinterland (1998) (L'arrière-pays)
- Porn Theater (2002): La chatte à deux têtes
- Before I Forget (2007) Avant que j'oublie
