= La matiouette ou l'arrière-pays =

1983 film

- Directed by: André Téchiné
- Written by: Philippe Du Janerand; Jacques Nolot; Laurent Perrout; André Téchiné
- Starring: Jacques Nolot; Patrick Fierry
- Cinematography: Pascal Marti
- Edited by: Martine Giordano
- Distributed by: Gerick Distribution
- Release date: 27 July 1983
- Running time: 48 minutes
- Country: France
- Language: French

La matiouette ou l'arrière-pays (also known as La matiouette) is a 1983 French 48-minute drama film directed by André Téchiné. It was screened in the Un Certain Regard section at the 1983 Cannes Film Festival.

== Cast ==
- Jacques Nolot as Alain Pruez
- Patrick Fierry as Jacky Verrière
