= Les Égouts du paradis =

French movie

Les Égouts du paradis The Sewers of Paradise
- Directed by: José Giovanni
- Written by: Albert Spaggiari (novel); José Giovanni (adaptation); Michel Audiard (dialogue)
- Starring: Francis Huster; Jean-François Balmer; Lila Kedrova
- Cinematography: Walter Bal
- Edited by: Marie-Thérèse Boiché; Jacqueline Thiédot
- Music by: Jean-Pierre Doering
- Distributed by: U.G.C. / C.F.D.C.
- Release date: March 14, 1979 (France)
- Running time: 115 min
- Country: France
- Language: French

Les Égouts du paradis (The Sewers of Paradise) is a 1979 French film directed by José Giovanni, based on a 1976 heist by Albert Spaggiari.

== Cast and roles ==
- Francis Huster as Albert Spaggiari
- Jean-François Balmer as 68
- Lila Kedrova as Charlotte
- Bérangère Bonvoisin as Mireille
- Gabriel Briand as Mike la Baraka
- Clément Harari as L'Égyptien
- Michel Subor as Biki le Targuy
- Mustapha Dali as Nazareth
- Jean Franval as Old Joseph
- Michel Peyrelon as Pierre
- André Pousse as the Bald Man
- Jacques Richard as Golden Mouth
- Serge Valletti as the Dancer

== See also ==
- The Great Riviera Bank Robbery (1979)
- The Easy Way (2008)
