= Pauline Duhault =

French film producer

- Occupation: Film producer
- Years active: 1997-present

Pauline Duhault is a French film producer.

== Filmography ==
- Drancy Avenir, (1997)
- Jeanne and the Perfect Guy, (1998)
- Le New Yorker, (1998)
- Beach Cafe, (2001)
- Glowing Eyes, (2002)
- Mister V., (2003)
- Amateurs, (2003)
- Sois jeune et tais-toi, (2003, short)
- A Year in My Life, (2006)
- Before I Forget, (2007)
- Fragile(s), (2007)
- The Easy Way, (2008)
- Itinéraire bis, (2011)
- Quand je serai petit, (2012)
- Cookie, (2013)
- Encore heureux, (2015)
- The African Doctor, (2016)
- Smile, (2016, short)
- Bon enfant, (2020, short)
- A radiant girl, (2021)
