= 99 Moons =

- Theatrical release poster
- Directed by: Jan Gassmann
- Written by: Jan Gassmann
- Produced by: Reto Schaerli; Lukas Hobi
- Starring: Valentina Di Pace; Dominik Fellmann
- Cinematography: Yunus Roy Imer
- Edited by: Miriam Maerk; Jacques L’Amour
- Music by: Michelle Gurevich
- Production company: Zodiac Pictures
- Distributed by: Filmcoopi Zürich
- Release date: August 2022 (Edinburgh)
- Running time: 110 minutes
- Country: Switzerland
- Language: German

99 Moons is a 2022 Swiss drama film written and directed by Jan Gassmann and starring Valentina Di Pace and Dominik Fellmann.

== Cast ==
- Valentina Di Pace as Bigna
- Dominik Fellmann as Frank
- Danny Exnar as Georg
- Jessica Huber as Barbara
- Leo Matteo Girolamo
- Gregory Hari as Thaks
- Lia J. von Blarer as Divna

== Release ==
The film was released at the Edinburgh International Film Festival in August 2022. That same month, it was announced that Strand Releasing acquired North American distribution rights to the film.

== Reception ==
Claire Shaffer of The New York Times gave the film a negative review and wrote, "Gassmann clearly wants to explore the state of love and sexuality in the 2020s(...)but he succeeds only in conveying the pathologies of two people who can’t figure out what they want from each other."

Amber Wilkinson of Screen International also gave the film a negative review and wrote, "While Gassmann captures the energy of a younger generation in which traditional ideas around relationships are shifting, he struggles to fully shape it into a compelling narrative."
