= Smugglers' Songs =

2011 film

- Directed by: Rabah Ameur-Zaïmeche
- Written by: Rabah Ameur-Zaïmeche
- Produced by: Rabah Ameur-Zaïmeche
- Starring: Jacques Nolot
- Cinematography: Irina Lubtchansky
- Edited by: Nicolas Bancilhon
- Music by: Valentin Clastrier
- Release dates: 8 August 2011 (Locarno); 24 August 2011 (France)
- Running time: 97 minutes
- Country: France
- Language: French

Smugglers' Songs (French: Les Chants de Mandrin) is a 2011 French adventure film written and directed by Rabah Ameur-Zaïmeche. It won the 2011 Prix Jean Vigo award.

== Plot ==
Following the death of the notorious smuggler Louis Mandrin his old friends walk in his footsteps and make him popular by composing and singing songs about him.

== Cast ==
- Jacques Nolot as Le marquis
- Christian Milia-Darmezin as Le colporteur Jean Sératin
- Kenji Levan as Court-Toujours
- Rabah Ameur-Zaïmeche as Bélissard
- Salim Ameur-Zaïmeche as Malice
- Sylvain Roume as Ma Noblesse
- Nicolas Bancilhon as Blondin
- Abel Jafri as La Buse
- Sylvain Rifflet as La Flûte
- Sylvia Albaret as Mandrinette
- Xavier Pons as Le sergent
- Jean-Luc Nancy as L'imprimeur Jean-Luc Cynan
- Yann-Yvon Pennec as Le brigadier-chef
