= Encore heureux =

2015 film by Benoît Graffin

- Theatrical release poster
- Directed by: Benoît Graffin
- Written by: Nicolas Bedos; Benoît Graffin; Deborah Saïag; Mika Tard
- Produced by: Dominique Farrugia; Christopher Lambert; Pauline Duhault
- Starring: Sandrine Kiberlain; Édouard Baer; Benjamin Biolay
- Cinematography: Antoine Héberlé
- Edited by: Jennifer Auge
- Music by: Stephen Coates
- Production companies: EuropaCorp; E.D.I Films
- Distributed by: EuropaCorp. Distribution
- Release dates: 10 November 2015 (Arras Film Festival); 27 January 2016
- Running time: 93 minutes
- Country: France
- Language: French
- Budget: $7.1 million
- Box office: $2.4 million

Encore heureux is a 2015 French drama film written and directed by Benoît Graffin.

== Cast ==
- Sandrine Kiberlain as Marie Ogiel
- Édouard Baer as Sam Ogiel
- Benjamin Biolay as Antoine
- Carla Besnaïnou as Alexia Ogiel
- Mathieu Torloting as Clément Ogiel
- Guilaine Londez as Madame Martin
- Bulle Ogier as Louise
- Anna Gaylor as Madeleine
- Florence Viala as Cathy
- Hindiya Elkassmi as Chloé
