= Marly-Gomont (song) =

Single by Kamini

from the album Psychostar World
- Released: November 13, 2006
- Recorded: 2006
- Genre: R&B
- Length: 5:09
- Label: RCA Music Group
- Songwriter: Kamini
- Producer: Psychostar

Kamini singles chronology
"Marly-Gomont" (2006)	"J'Suis blanc" (2007)

"Marly-Gomont" is the first single by French rapper Kamini, recorded in 2006. It was produced under the RCA Group label and released on November 13, 2006. The song is Kamini's ode to the small, rural village in Northern France where he grew up, Marly-Gomont. In the song, Kamini laments being from the only black family in town. The song became a number-one single in France, and as of August 2014, it was the 57th best-selling single of the 21st century in France, with 376,000 units sold.

== Music video ==
The videoclip, shot by Kamini and Émilie Desbonnet and sent on September 12 to several record companies, was refused, but amused the employees of the labels who circulated it until making it a true popular success. The song and the video were quickly broadcast on several media : Fun Radio, Skyrock and Contact FM. Kamini was also invited to perform his song on numerous French broadcasts : CaueTivi, the TV News on TF1, Le Grand Journal, La Méthode Cauet, On a tout essayé, Star Academy on December 1, and on Direct 8 on November 24.

The video was awarded best video clip at time of French show Victoires de la musique 2007.

The song and its video were parodied by the French satirical television programme Les Guignols de l'info with a song entitled "Hénin-Beaumont" after the far-right Front National party won the control of the town of Hénin-Beaumont in the 2014 elections.

== Track listing ==
CD single

1. "Marly-Gomont" — 5:09
2. "Marly-Gomont" (video) — 5:09
3. Documentary — 3:54

== Charts ==
Chart (2007)	Peak position
Belgian (Wallonia) Singles Chart	2
Eurochart Hot 100	4
French SNEP Singles Chart	1
Swiss Singles Chart	21

End of year chart (2006)	Position
French Singles Chart	21
End of year chart (2007)	Position
Belgian (Wallonia) Singles Chart	7
French Airplay Chart	90
French Singles Chart	3
French TV Airplay Chart	80

== Certifications ==
Certifications for "Marly-Gomont"
Region	Certification	Certified units/sales
Belgium (BRMA)	Gold	25,000^{*}
France (SNEP)	Platinum	300,000^{*}
^{*} Sales figures based on certification alone.
