= Julien Rambaldi =

French film director and screenwriter

- Occupations: Director, screenwriter
- Years active: 2001–Present
- Known for: Bienvenue à Marly-Gomont (The African Doctor) (2016)
- Partner: Léa Drucker
- Children: Martha

Julien Rambaldi is a French film director and screenwriter.

== Career ==
Rambaldi became known after his short film Scotch (2003) was awarded in several festivals.

He then directed the feature film Les Meilleurs Amis du monde (Best Friends in the World), released (2010).

In 2016, he directed the feature film Bienvenue à Marly-Gomont (The African Doctor).

== Personal ==
In 2014, he had a daughter named Martha with actress Léa Drucker.

== Works ==
Film Director:

- 2003: Scotch (short)
- 2010: Les Meilleurs Amis du monde (Best Friends in the World)
- 2015: Jeudi 15 H
- 2016: Bienvenue à Marly-Gomont (The African Doctor)
- 2020: C'est la Vie (Labor Day)
- 2022: Les Femmes du Square (The Nannies)

Film Writer:

- 2003: Scotch (short)
- 2010: Les Meilleurs Amis du monde (Best Friends in the World)
- 2015: Jeudi 15 H
- 2016: Bienvenue à Marly-Gomont (The African Doctor)
- 2020: C'est la Vie (Labor Day)
- 2022: Les Femmes du Square (The Nannies)

== See also ==
- Léa Drucker
- The African Doctor

== External sources ==
- Julien Rambaldi at IMDb
- "Julien Rambaldi". UniFrance.
- Julien Rambaldi (Agence Adêquat)
