= Before I Forget (film) =

2007 film

- Theatrical release poster
- Directed by: Jacques Nolot
- Written by: Jacques Nolot
- Produced by: Pauline Duhault
- Starring: Jacques Nolot; Marc Rioufol; Lyes Rabia; Albert Mainella
- Cinematography: Josée Deshaies
- Edited by: Sophie Reine
- Music by: Gustave Mahler
- Production company: Elia Films
- Distributed by: ID Distribution
- Release date: 17 October 2007
- Running time: 108 minutes
- Country: France
- Language: French

Before I forget (French: Avant que j'oublie) is a 2007 French drama film directed, written and starred in by Jacques Nolot. The film portrays the life of an aging gay man, who was a hustler in his youth, confronting old age, an empty life and a reversal of paying for sex. The film was well received by critics.

== Plot ==
Pierre is a 58-year-old gay man who was a hustler in his youth. He is no longer considered desirable and now finds himself in the reverse position: He is the one paying for sex. He has trouble sleeping, has a coffee, and starts chain smoking. In the morning, he receives a visit from Marc, a young hustler. They have sex, but the joyless encounter ends quickly; Pierre has been HIV positive for 24 years and his various medications have affected his performance. Marc invites him to a drag club but Pierre rejects the offer because he would have to shave his mustache.

Pierre later visits Jacques, a wealthy gay friend, who is married and has tax problems. They compare bargains on gigolos. Pierre brags that he has acquired the services of one young man for half the price that his friend paid. A trip to Pigalle for sex is curtailed because of Pierre's impotence problem. At his lawyer's, an old gay man, Pierre runs into a friend from many years ago, Paul, an ex con who has inherited money from his late lover Gaston, an ex-lover of Pierre. Paul, who was barely 17 years old when Pierre was in his prime, was having sex with the lawyer when Pierre arrived to invite him for lunch. At the restaurant, they compare crime stories: stealing things, doing time, etc. Pierre casually mentions that he used to cruise with Roland Barthes and later reflects on his now lost youth and good looks, commenting that then "Apart from sun, cock, and bars, nothing much interested me."

Toutoune, Pierre's former older lover and patron, 35 years older than him, died recently and Pierre had been hoping to inherit some money, but no will was found and he was swindled out of his inheritance by Toutoune's relatives. With a friend, he visits Toutoune's house looking for some artwork that was left to him. "What would make me happy? Nothing..." he says at one point, adding that a new young lover might do the trick.

Pierre visits his psychotherapist and discusses his depression. The therapist shuts down the session just as Pierre gets going. Back home, Pierre worries that his medication, aside from warnings about liver trouble and other dangerous side effects, will make him lose his hair. Later, Pierre gives oral sex to a man who delivers his groceries, advises a young gigolo and visits his friend David. Finally he dresses in drag to visit a porn cinema with Marc.

== Cast ==
- Jacques Nolot as Pierre
- Marc Rioufol as Paul
- Bastien d'Asnières as Marc
- Bruno Moneglia as Bruno
- Jean Pommier as Georges
- David Kessler as Manosky
- Albert Mainella as Toutoune

== Home media ==
The film was released on DVD in the US in September 2008. It was released with English subtitles, and also with a subtitled two-minute theatrical trailer as the bonus feature.
