= Benoît Graffin =

French screenwriter and film director (born 1966)

- Born: 14 August 1966 (age 59)
- Occupation(s): Screenwriter, film director
- Years active: 1998–present

Benoît Graffin (born 14 August 1966) is a French screenwriter and film director. In 1998 he won a development grant for Café de la plage in the Montpellier Mediterranean Film Festival.

== Filmography ==
As a writer:

- The Trouble With You (2018)
- Open at Night (2016)
- The African Doctor (2016)
- Encore heureux (2016) Also director
- De vrais mensonges (2010)
- La fille de Monaco (2008)
- Priceless (2006)
- Les ambitieux (2006)
- Après vous... (2003)
- Café de la plage (2001) Also director
- Le New Yorker (1998) Also director
