= Glowing Eyes (film) =

2002 film

- Film poster
- Directed by: Jacques Nolot
- Written by: Jacques Nolot
- Produced by: Pauline Duhault
- Starring: Vittoria Scognamiglio; Jacques Nolot
- Cinematography: Germain Desmoulins
- Edited by: Sophie Reine
- Music by: Nino
- Distributed by: Mars Distribution
- Release date: 20 October 2002
- Running time: 90 minutes
- Country: France
- Language: French

Glowing Eyes (alternative title: Porn Theatre) (French: La chatte à deux têtes) is a 2002 French drama film directed by and starring Jacques Nolot. It was screened in the Un Certain Regard section at the 2002 Cannes Film Festival. The film has been cited as a favorite by filmmaker John Waters, who presented it as his annual selection within the 2005 Maryland Film Festival and selected it for his 2006 anthology series John Waters Presents Movies That Will Corrupt You.

== Plot ==
In a decrepit Parisian porn film theatre, a fifty-year-old man and a young projectionist begin a tentative relationship, observed by the world-weary Italian-born cashier at the ticket booth.

== Cast ==
- Vittoria Scognamiglio - Cashier
- Jacques Nolot - 50-Year-Old Man
- Sébastien Viala - Projectionist
- Olivier Torres - L'homme à la robe jaune
- Lionel Goldstein - L'homme à l'imper noir
- Frédéric Longbois - L'homme à l'éventail
- Fouad Zeraoui - L'homme qui a cu sa dose
- Jean-Louis Coquery - L'homme nu
- Raphaëline Goupilleau - SDF...
- Pascal Varley - SDF...
- Arben Bajraktaraj - SDF...
- Christine Paolini - Fliquette
- Matt Trahan - Flic 1
- Mark Duran - Flic 2 (as Marc Durant)
- Frédéric Franzil - Gigolo
- Dominique Daguier - L'homme battu
