= Francis Megahy =

British film director (1935–2020)

- Born: 18 March 1935; Manchester, United Kingdom
- Died: 1 May 2020 (aged 85); Los Angeles, California, United States
- Occupation: Film director

Francis Megahy (18 March 1935 – 1 May 2020) was a British film director.

== Filmography ==
- Freelance (1971)
- The Great Riviera Bank Robbery (1979)
- Flashpoint Africa (1980)
- Real Life (1984)
- Taffin (1988)
