= The Great Riviera Bank Robbery =

1979 British film by Francis Megahy

- Directed by: Francis Megahy
- Written by: Francis Megahy; Bernie Cooper
- Produced by: Martin McKeand
- Starring: Ian McShane; Warren Clarke; Stephen Greif; Christopher Malcolm
- Cinematography: Peter Jessop
- Edited by: Arthur Solomon
- Music by: Stanley Myers
- Production company: ITC Entertainment
- Distributed by: Incorporated Television Company
- Release date: 21 March 1979
- Running time: 102 minutes
- Country: United Kingdom
- Language: English
- Budget: £364,000

The Great Riviera Bank Robbery, also known as Dirty Money and Sewers of Gold, is a 1979 British heist film written and directed by Francis Megahy and starring Ian McShane, Warren Clarke, Stephen Greif and Christopher Malcolm. In the film, based on a bank robbery masterminded by Albert Spaggiari in 1976, members of a neo-fascist group team up with professional criminals to rob the safe deposit vault of a bank in a French resort town.

It is the British version of the French film Les Égouts du paradis, released the same year.

== Plot ==
Bert and Jean are members of a right-wing nationalist organisation closely connected to the Organisation armée secrète. Both men are ex-military, but now find themselves on the wrong side of the law in Nice, France. Needing to raise cash to buy weapons, Bert, an ex-paratrooper known as 'The Brain', devises a plan to dig their way into a bank vault from below.

Requiring criminal expertise, they persuade some local French gangsters to join them, in return for a cut of the haul. The gangsters' interest is purely financial, whilst Bert is at pains to point out that his interest is political. After several nights spent digging through a wall in a sewer, they break their way into the safe deposit boxes, and try to make their getaway without being caught.

They delay pursuit by welding the vault shut so that the crime is not discovered immediately as the bank assumes it is a faulty door, which will not open. The gang lie low in a villa and go to great lengths ensure the loot is shared fairly with the gang to avoid recrimination.

The police struggle to get a lead but the gangsters soon start spending their shares and the notes are traced back to them leading to all the gangsters being arrested.

Meanwhile, the fascists are trying to sell the gold bars. They use connections with corrupt government officials to get it on a flight to Japan, disguised as camera equipment. It is then sold without questions being asked. They spend their share on buying arms.

Eventually the police get a lead from the gangsters criminal network as to the whereabouts of 'The Brain'. He and most of the others are arrested and the arms found. He tries to cut a deal, exchanging a full disclosure on how the robbery was carried out in exchange for the arms charges being dropped.

Before he can be brought to trial those accomplices who remain free snatch him from police custody and he escapes to South America.

== Cast ==
- Ian McShane as The Brain
- Warren Clarke as Jean
- Stephen Greif as Rocco
- Christopher Malcolm as Serge
- Nigel Humphreys as Alex
- Eric Mason as Fernand
- Matthew Long as Michel
- Alain Guano as Alain
- Barry Lowe as Lawyer
- John Malcolm as Gendarme
- Jonathan Elsom as Magistrate
- Arnold Diamond as Town Hall Man
- Christopher Burgess as Policeman
- Kevin Brennan as Customer
- Sheila Ruskin as Bank Girl
- Adrian Shergold as Young Leftie

== Miscellanea ==
A French film based on the same events, Les Égouts du paradis, directed by Jose Giovanni, was released the same year.

The robbery on which the film is based was carried out by the French criminal Albert Spaggiari.

== Media releases ==
The film was released on Region 2 DVD in 2007.
