= 1979 in the United Kingdom =

Events from the year 1979 in the United Kingdom.

== Incumbents ==
- Monarch – Elizabeth II
- Prime Minister - James Callaghan (Labour) (until 4 May), Margaret Thatcher (Conservative) (starting 4 May)

== Events ==
=== January ===
- 1 January – French carmaker Peugeot completes its takeover of the European division of financially troubled American carmaker Chrysler, which was agreed last year and includes the British operations of the former Rootes Group and the French Simca brand. The company’s cars continue to be sold under these brands, but are expected to be rebranded in the near future.
- 5 January – Lorry drivers go on strike, causing new shortages of heating oil and fresh food.
- 10 January – Prime Minister James Callaghan returns from an international summit to a Britain in a state of industrial unrest. The Sun newspaper reports his comments with a famous headline: "Crisis? What Crisis?"
- 15 January – British Rail workers begin a 24-hour strike.
- 22 January – Tens of thousands of public-workers strike in the beginning of what becomes known as the Winter of Discontent.

=== February ===
- 1 February – Grave-diggers call off a strike in Liverpool which has delayed dozens of burials.
- 2 February – Sid Vicious, the former Sex Pistols guitarist, is found dead in New York after apparently suffocating on his own vomit as a result of a heroin overdose. 21-year-old London-born Vicious was on bail for the second degree murder of his girlfriend Nancy Spungen, who was found stabbed to death in a hotel room on 12 October last year.
- 6 February – The Church of England Suffragan See of Wolverhampton is erected with Barry Rogerson becoming its first Bishop.
- 9 February – The England international striker Trevor Francis signs for Nottingham Forest from Birmingham City in British football's first £1 million deal.
- 12 February – Over 1,000 schools close due to the heating oil shortage caused by the lorry drivers' strike.
- 14 February – "Saint Valentine's Day Concordat" between Trades Union Congress and Government, The Economy, the Government, and Trade Union Responsibilities, marks an end to the Winter of Discontent.
- 15 February – Opinion polls show the Conservatives up to 20 points ahead of Labour, whose popularity has slumped due to the Winter of Discontent. With a general election due this year, a Conservative victory is now widely expected, just months after prime minister James Callaghan had decided against calling a general election which the opinion polls suggested Labour would have won.
- 22 February – Saint Lucia becomes independent of the United Kingdom.
- 26 February – Death of the last Muggletonian.

=== March ===
- 1 March
  - Scottish devolution referendum: Scotland votes by a majority of 77,437 for a Scottish Assembly, which is not implemented due to a condition that at least 40% of the electorate must support the proposal.
  - Welsh devolution referendum: Wales votes against devolution.
  - Conservative candidate David Waddington retains the seat for his party in the Clitheroe by-election.
  - National Health Service workers in the West Midlands threaten to go on strike in their bid to win a nine per cent pay rise.
- 17 March – Nottingham Forest beat Southampton 3–2 at Wembley Stadium to win the Football League Cup for the second year running.
- 18 March – An explosion at the Golborne colliery in Golborne, Greater Manchester, kills three men.
- 22 March – Richard Sykes, UK ambassador to the Netherlands, is shot dead by a Provisional Irish Republican Army member in The Hague.
- 28 March – 1979 vote of no confidence in the Callaghan ministry: James Callaghan's government loses a vote of no confidence in Parliament by one vote, forcing a General Election. This is the first successful vote of no confidence in a British government since 1924 and will be the last for more than 40 years.
- 29 March – James Callaghan announces that the General Election will be held on 3 May. All of the major opinion polls point towards a Conservative win which would make Margaret Thatcher the first female British prime minister.
- 30 March – Airey Neave, World War II veteran and Conservative Northern Ireland spokesman, is killed by an Irish National Liberation Army bomb in the House of Commons car park.
- 31 March – The Royal Navy withdraws from Malta as ordered by Maltese President Anton Buttigieg.

=== April ===
- April – Statistics show that the economy shrank by 0.8% in the first quarter of the year, largely due to the Winter of Discontent, sparking fears that Britain could soon be faced with its second recession in four years.
- 4 April – Josephine Whitaker, a 19-year-old bank worker, is murdered in Halifax; police believe that she is the 11th woman to be murdered by the Yorkshire Ripper.
- 7 April – The last RT type buses run in London, on route 62.
- 23 April – Anti-Nazi League protester Blair Peach is fatally injured after being struck on the head probably by a member of the Metropolitan Police's Special Patrol Group.

=== May ===
- Undated - General Motors ends production of the Vauxhall Viva after 16 years and three generations. It is due to be replaced soon by a Vauxhall-badged version of the forthcoming new front-wheel drive Opel Kadett.
- 1 May – The London Underground Jubilee line is inaugurated by the Prince of Wales.
- 3 May – 1979 general election.
- 4 May – The Conservatives win the General Election by a 44-seat majority and Margaret Thatcher becomes the first female Prime Minister of the United Kingdom. Liberal Party leader Jeremy Thorpe is the most notable MP to lose his seat in the election. Despite being 67 years old and having lost the first General Election he has contested, James Callaghan stays on until November 1980 as leader of a Labour Party now in opposition after five years in government. Among the new members of parliament is John Major, 36-year-old MP for Huntingdon.
- 8 May – Former Liberal Party leader and MP Jeremy Thorpe goes on trial at the Old Bailey charged with attempted murder.
- 9 May – Liverpool win the Football League First Division title for the 12th time.
- 12 May – Arsenal defeat Manchester United 3–2 in the FA Cup final at Wembley Stadium, with Alan Sunderland scoring a last-gasp winner in response to two United goals inside the last five minutes which had seen the scores level at 2–2.
- 15 May – Government abolishes the Price Commission.
- 21 May
  - Elton John becomes the first musician from the west to perform live in the Soviet Union.
  - Conservative MPs back Margaret Thatcher's proposals to sell off parts of nationalised industries. During the year, the government will begin to sell its stake in BP.
- 24 May – Thorpe Park at Chertsey in Surrey is opened; it becomes one of the top three most popular theme parks in the country.
- 25 May – Price of milk increases more than 10% to 15 pence a pint.
- 30 May – Nottingham Forest F.C. defeat Malmö FF, the Swedish football league champions, 1–0 in the European Cup final at Olympiastadion, Munich. The only goal of the game is scored by Trevor Francis.

=== June ===
- 7 June – European Parliament election, the first direct election to the European Parliament; the turnout in Britain is low at 32%. The Conservatives have the most MEPs at 60, while Labour only have 17. The Liberals gain a 12.6% share of the vote but not a single MEP, while the Scottish National Party, Democratic Unionist Party, Social Democratic and Labour Party and Official Ulster Unionist Party all gain an MEP each.
- 12 June – The new Conservative government's first budget sees chancellor Geoffrey Howe cut the standard tax rate by 3p and slashing the top rate from 83% to 60%.
- 18 June – Neil Kinnock, 37-year-old Labour MP for Islwyn in South Wales, becomes shadow education spokesman.
- 22 June – Former Liberal Party leader Jeremy Thorpe is cleared in court of the allegations of attempted murder which have nonetheless ruined his career.
- 26 June – The eleventh James Bond film – Moonraker – is released in UK cinemas. It is the fourth of seven films to star Roger Moore as James Bond.

=== July ===
- 5 July – Queen Elizabeth II attends the millennium celebrations of the Isle of Man's Parliament, Tynwald.
- 12 July – Kiribati (formerly Gilbert Islands) becomes independent of the United Kingdom.
- 17 July – Athlete Sebastian Coe sets a record time for running a mile, completing it in 3 minutes 48.95 seconds, in Oslo.
- 23 July – The government announces £4 billion worth of public spending cuts.
- 26 July – Education Act repeals the 1976 Act, allowing local education authorities to retain selective secondary schools.
- 31 July – Seventeen people are killed in the Sumburgh air disaster when a Dan-Air Hawker Siddeley HS 748 fails to take off at Sumburgh Airport in the Shetland Islands, crashes into the sea defences and plunges into the sea. The cause is later identified as elevator failure.

=== August ===
- 1 August – Following the recent takeover of Chrysler's European division by French carmaker Peugeot, the historic Talbot marque is revived for the range of cars previously sold in Britain as Chryslers, also taking over from the Simca brand in France.
- 9 August – Establishment of a public naturist beach in Brighton is agreed.
- 10 August–23 October – The entire ITV network in the UK is shut down by a technicians' strike (Channel Television remains unaffected).
- 14 August
  - A storm in the Irish Sea hits the Fastnet yacht race. Fifteen lives and dozens of yachts are lost.
  - Disgraced ex-MP John Stonehouse is released from jail after serving four years of his seven-year sentence for faking his own death.
- 24 August – The Ford Cortina, Britain's best selling car, enters its fifth generation when a restyled version of the 1976 model is launched.
- 27 August
  - Lord Mountbatten of Burma and two 15-year-olds, his nephew and a boatboy, are assassinated by a Provisional Irish Republican Army bomb while holidaying in the Republic of Ireland, the Dowager Lady Brabourne dying the following day in hospital of injuries received. Lord Mountbatten was a retired fleet admiral, statesman, cousin to Elizabeth II and an uncle of Prince Philip, Duke of Edinburgh.
  - Warrenpoint ambush: eighteen British soldiers are killed in Northern Ireland by IRA bombs.
- 30 August – Two men are arrested in Dublin and charged with the murder of Lord Mountbatten and the three other victims of the bombing.

=== September ===
- 2 September – Police discover a woman's body in an alleyway near Bradford city centre. The woman, 20-year-old student Barbara Leach, is believed to be the 12th victim of the mysterious Yorkshire Ripper mass murderer.
- 5 September
  - The Queen leads the mourning at the funeral of Lord Mountbatten of Burma.
  - Manchester City F.C. pay a British club record fee of £1,450,000 for Wolverhampton Wanderers midfielder Steve Daley.
- 8 September – Wolverhampton Wanderers set a new national transfer record by paying just under £1,500,000 for Aston Villa and Scotland striker Andy Gray.
- 10 September – British Leyland announces that production of MG cars will finish in the autumn of next year, in a move which will see the Abingdon, Oxfordshire, plant closed.
- 14 September – The government announces plans to regenerate the London Docklands with housing and commercial developments.
- 21 September – A Royal Air Force Harrier jet crashes into a house in Wisbech, Cambridgeshire killing two men and a boy.
- 25 September – Margaret Thatcher opens the new Central Milton Keynes shopping centre, the largest indoor shopping centre in Britain, after its final phase is completed six years after development of the complex first began.

=== October ===
- October – Statistics show a 2.3% contraction in the economy for the third quarter of the year, sparking fresh fears of another recession.
- 1 October – Tuvalu (formerly Ellice Islands) becomes independent of the United Kingdom.
- 5 October – Scottish Gaelic service Radio nan Eilean established in Stornoway.
- 11 October – Godfrey Hounsfield wins the Nobel Prize in Physiology or Medicine jointly with Allan McLeod Cormack "for the development of computer assisted tomography".
- 23 October – All remaining foreign exchange controls abolished.
- 27 October – Saint Vincent and the Grenadines gains independence.
- 28 October – Chairman Hua Guofeng becomes the first Chinese leader to visit Britain.
- 30 October – Martin Webster of the National Front is found guilty of inciting racial hatred.

=== November ===
- November – British Leyland chief executive Michael Edwardes wins the overwhelming backing of more than 100,000 of the carmaker's employees for his restructuring plans, which over the next few years will result in the closure of several plants and the loss of some 25,000 jobs.
- 1 November
  - The government announces £3.5 billion in public spending cuts and an increase in prescription charges.
  - The Queen and the Duke of Edinburgh inaugurate the modernised Glasgow Subway with a ride on a new train between Buchanan Street and St Enoch; however, the underground does not open to the public until the following April.
- 5 November – The two men accused of murdering Lord Mountbatten and three others go on trial in Dublin.
- 9 November – Four men are found guilty over the killing of paperboy Carl Bridgewater, who was shot dead at a farmhouse in the Staffordshire countryside 14 months ago. James Robinson and Vincent Hickey receive life sentences with a recommended minimum of 25 years for murder, 18-year-old Michael Hickey (also guilty of murder) receives an indefinite custodial sentence, while Patrick Molloy is guilty of manslaughter and jailed for 12 years.
- 11 November – Last episode of the first series of the sitcom To the Manor Born on BBC One receives 23.95 million viewers, the all-time highest figure for a recorded programme in the UK.
- 13 November
  - The Times is published for the first time in nearly a year after a dispute between management and unions over staffing levels and new technology.
  - Miners reject a 20% pay increase and threaten to go on strike until they get their desired pay rise of 65%.
- 14 November – General Motors begins UK sales of the new front-wheel drive Opel Kadett, which is currently produced in the combine’s West German and Belgian factories, and will also be sold from March 1980 as the Vauxhall Astra.
- 15 November
  - Minimum Lending Rate reaches an all-time high of 17%.
  - Art historian and former Surveyor of the Queen's Pictures Anthony Blunt's role as the "fourth man" of the 'Cambridge Five' double agents for the Soviet NKVD during World War II is confirmed by Prime Minister Margaret Thatcher in the House of Commons; she gives further details on 21 November. He is stripped of his knighthood.
- 21 November – Six months after winning the general election, the Conservatives are five points behind Labour (who have a 45% share of the vote) in an MORI opinion poll.
- 23 November – In Dublin, Ireland, Irish Republican Army member Thomas McMahon is sentenced to life in prison for the assassination of Lord Mountbatten.

=== December ===
- 4 December – The Hastie Fire in Hull leads to the deaths of 3 boys and begins the hunt for Bruce George Peter Lee, the UK's most prolific killer.
- 7 December – Lord Soames appointed as the transitional governor of Rhodesia to oversee its move to independence.
- 10 December
  - William Arthur Lewis wins the Nobel Prize in Economics with Theodore Schultz "for their pioneering research into economic development research with particular consideration of the problems of developing countries".
  - Stunt performer Eddie Kidd performs an 80 ft jump on a motorcycle.
- 14 December
  - Doubts are raised over the convictions of the four men in the Carl Bridgewater case after Hubert Vincent Spencer is charged with murdering 70-year-old farmer Hubert Wilkes at a farmhouse less than half a mile away from the one where Carl Bridgewater was murdered.
  - The Clash release post-punk album London Calling.
- 20 December – The government publishes the Housing Bill which will give council house tenants the right to buy their homes from the following year. More than 5 million households in the United Kingdom currently occupy council houses.
- 21 December – Lancaster House Agreement, an independent agreement for Rhodesia is signed in London.

=== Undated ===
- Inflation rises to 13.4%.
- The largest number of working days lost through strike action since 1926.
- Dame Josephine Barnes becomes first woman president of the British Medical Association.
- The first JD Wetherspoon pub is established by Tim Martin in the London Borough of Haringey.
- New plant species, Senecio eboracensis, the York groundsel, is discovered.
- Common crane returns to The Broads.
- A record of more than 1.7 million new cars are sold in the United Kingdom this year, with the best selling car, the Ford Cortina, selling more than 190,000 units. Ford Motor Company enjoys the largest share of the new car market, followed in second place by British Leyland, with the former Chrysler Europe brands (now owned by Peugeot) in third place, and Vauxhall in fourth. Foreign brands including Datsun, Renault and Volkswagen also prove popular.

== Publications ==
- Douglas Adams' novel The Hitchhiker's Guide to the Galaxy.
- J. G. Ballard's novel The Unlimited Dream Company.
- Angela Carter's short stories The Bloody Chamber.
- Penelope Fitzgerald's novel Offshore.
- William Golding's novel Darkness Visible.
- V. S. Naipaul's novel A Bend in the River.
- 27 October – First issue (dated December 1979) of Viz comic published in Newcastle upon Tyne.

== Births ==
- 20 January – Will Young, singer, winner of Pop Idol (series 1)
- 21 January – Johann Hari, disgraced journalist whose Orwell Prize is revoked following charges of plagiarism
- 13 February – Rachel Reeves, economist and politician
- 2 March – Jocelyn Jee Esien, comedian and actress
- 12 March – Pete Doherty, rock musician (The Libertines and Babyshambles)
- 7 April – Mark Goldbridge, YouTuber
- 9 April – Ben Silverstone, actor
- 10 April – Sophie Ellis-Bextor, pop singer
- 14 April – Iain Balshaw, English rugby player
- 21 April – James McAvoy, Scottish actor
- 12 May – Karin Szymko, gymnast
- 12 May – Rob Key, cricketer and sportscaster
- 15 May – Rachel Walker, field hockey player
- 25 May – Jonny Wilkinson, rugby union player
- 12 June
  - Ellen Falkner, lawn bowler
  - Jamie Harding, actor
- 19 June – Graeme Ballard, Paralympic sprinter
- 20 June – James Vowles, motorsport engineer
- 29 June – Abs Breen, English singer (5ive)
- 2 July – Nick Lloyd Webber, composer and record producer (died 2023)
- 13 July – Craig Bellamy, football player and manager
- 16 July – Douglas Murray, author and political commentator
- 25 July – Ali Carter, snooker player
- 26 July – Johnson Beharry, VC, Grenadan-born war hero
- 30 July – Graeme McDowell, golfer
- 2 August - Donna Air, actress, TV presenter
- 5 August – David Healy, footballer
- 9 August – Lisa Nandy, politician
- 20 August – Jamie Cullum, singer
- 23 August – Ritchie Neville, English singer (5ive)
- 1 September – Neg Dupree, comedian
- 14 September – Stuart Fielden, rugby league player
- 15 September
  - Paul Rudd, disc jockey and songwriter
  - Robin Windsor, dancer (died 2024)
- 22 September – Rebecca Long-Bailey, politician
- 28 September – Annika Reeder, gymnast
- 4 October – Stefan Booth, actor
- 12 October – Steve Borthwick, rugby union player and coach
- 8 November – Aaron Hughes, footballer
- 9 November – Caroline Flack, television presenter and actress (died 2020)
- 22 November – Scott Robinson, English pop singer (5ive)
- 29 November – Simon Amstell, comedian and television presenter
- 1 December – Lisa Wooding, field-hockey player
- 3 December – Daniel Bedingfield, New Zealand-born pop singer and songwriter
- 14 December – Michael Owen, footballer
- 17 December – Charlotte Edwards, cricketer
- 24 December – Lucilla Wright, field-hockey player
- 25 December – Robert Huff, English racing driver

== Deaths ==
- 16 January – Peter Butterworth, actor and comedian (born 1919)
- 23 January – Frank Owen, journalist and politician (born 1905)
- 2 February – Sid Vicious (real name John Simon Ritchie), musician (Sex Pistols) (drug overdose in the United States) (born 1957)
- 13 February – Sir Israel Brodie, former Chief Rabbi (born 1895)
- 14 February – Reginald Maudling, politician (born 1917)
- 19 February – Wee Georgie Wood, actor and comedian (born 1895)
- 19 March – Richard Beckinsale, actor (born 1947)
- 23 March – Ted Anderson, footballer (born 1911)
- 24 March – Sir Jack Cohen, founder of the Tesco retail chain (born 1898)
- 30 March – Airey Neave, politician (assassinated) (born 1916)
- 11 May – Bernard Kettlewell, geneticist and lepidopterist (born 1907)
- 8 June – Norman Hartnell, fashion designer (born 1901)
- 8 July – Michael Wilding, actor (born 1912)
- 12 July – Olive Morris, social activist (born 1952 in Jamaica)
- 16 July – Alfred Deller, countertenor (born 1912)
- 19 July – Helen Bradley, painter (born 1900)
- 26 July – Sir Charles Clore, businessman and philanthropist (born 1904)
- 8 August – Nicholas Monsarrat, novelist (born 1910)
- 9 August – Cecil Jackson-Cole, humanitarian (born 1901)
- 11 August – J. G. Farrell, novelist (born 1935)
- 12 August – Ernst Chain, biochemist, discoverer of penicillin with Fleming and Florey (born 1899, German Empire)
- 23 August – Richard Hearne ("Mr Pastry"), comic performer (born 1908)
- 27 August – Louis Mountbatten, 1st Earl Mountbatten of Burma, last Viceroy of India (victim of IRA bombing) (born 1900)
- 28 August – Doreen Knatchbull, Baroness Brabourne, aristocrat and socialite (victim of IRA bombing) (born 1896)
- 29 August – Ivon Hitchens, painter (born 1893)
- 26 September – Leslie Frise, aerospace engineer and aircraft designer (born 1895)
- 27 September
  - Dame Gracie Fields, singer and comedian (born 1898)
  - Jimmy McCulloch, rock singer-songwriter and guitarist (born 1953)
- 10 October – Dr Christopher Evans, psychologist and computer scientist (born 1931)
- 13 October – Rebecca Helferich Clarke, composer and violist (born 1886)
- 15 October – Leslie Grade, theatrical talent agent (born 1916)
- 30 October – Sir Barnes Wallis, aeronautical engineer (born 1887)
- 8 November – Edward Ardizzone, painter, printmaker and author (born 1900)
- 23 November – Merle Oberon, actress (born 1911)
- 30 November – Joyce Grenfell, actress, comedian and singer-songwriter (born 1910)
- 7 December – Cecilia Payne-Gaposchkin, British-born American astronomer and astrophycisist (born 1900)
- 9 December – Jack Solomons, boxing promoter (born 1902)

== See also ==
- List of British films of 1979
