= Monostroma kuroshiense =

Scientific classification
- Kingdom: Plantae
- Division: Chlorophyta
- Class: Ulvophyceae
- Order: Ulotrichales
- Family: Monostromataceae
- Genus: Monostroma
- Species: M. kuroshiense

Binomial name
- Monostroma kuroshiense F.Bast, 2015

Species of seaweed

Monostroma kuroshiense, a green alga in the division Chlorophyta, is a green seaweed endemic to Kuroshio Coast of Japan. This high-value seaweed is called Hitoegusa or Hirohano hitoegusa (ヒロハノヒトエグサ) in Japanese. Previously this algae was known in binomen Monostroma latissimum, but the latest scientific research based on multilocal phylogeny discovered that this is a new species. The algae is named after Kuroshio Current, naming is done by phycologist Felix Bast This algae is commercially cultivated in East Asia and South America for the edible product "hitoegusa-nori" or "hirohano-hitoegusa nori", popular sushi wraps. Monostroma oligosaccharides with degree of polymerization 6 prepared by agarase digestion from Monostroma nitidum polysaccharides have been shown to be an effective prophylactic agent during in vitro and in vivo tests against Japanese encephalitis viral infection. The sulfated oligosaccharides from Monostroma seem to be promising candidates for further development as antiviral agents. The genus Monostroma is the most widely cultivated genus among green seaweeds.

== Life history ==
A number of peer-reviewed scientific literature exists on the ecophysiology of this algal genus. Natural and cultivated sexually reproducing environmental samples, as well as sexually reproducing and serendipitously discovered asexually reproducing ecotypes of monostromatic green alga from Tosa Bay, Japan are conspecific (belong to the same species). Patterns of seasonal fluctuations in its thallus lengths were habitat specific and recur annually. Both appearance and decay of thalli were earlier at high saline habitats, suggesting that salinity positively influences either maturation of sporophytes or senescence of gametophytes. Results from life cycle, thallus ontogeny, gametangial ontogeny and phylogenetic analyses suggest that this algal genus is evolutionarily affiliated in order ulotrichales. Type of life cycle is not a valid diagnostic character for the species circumscription in Monostromataceae.
