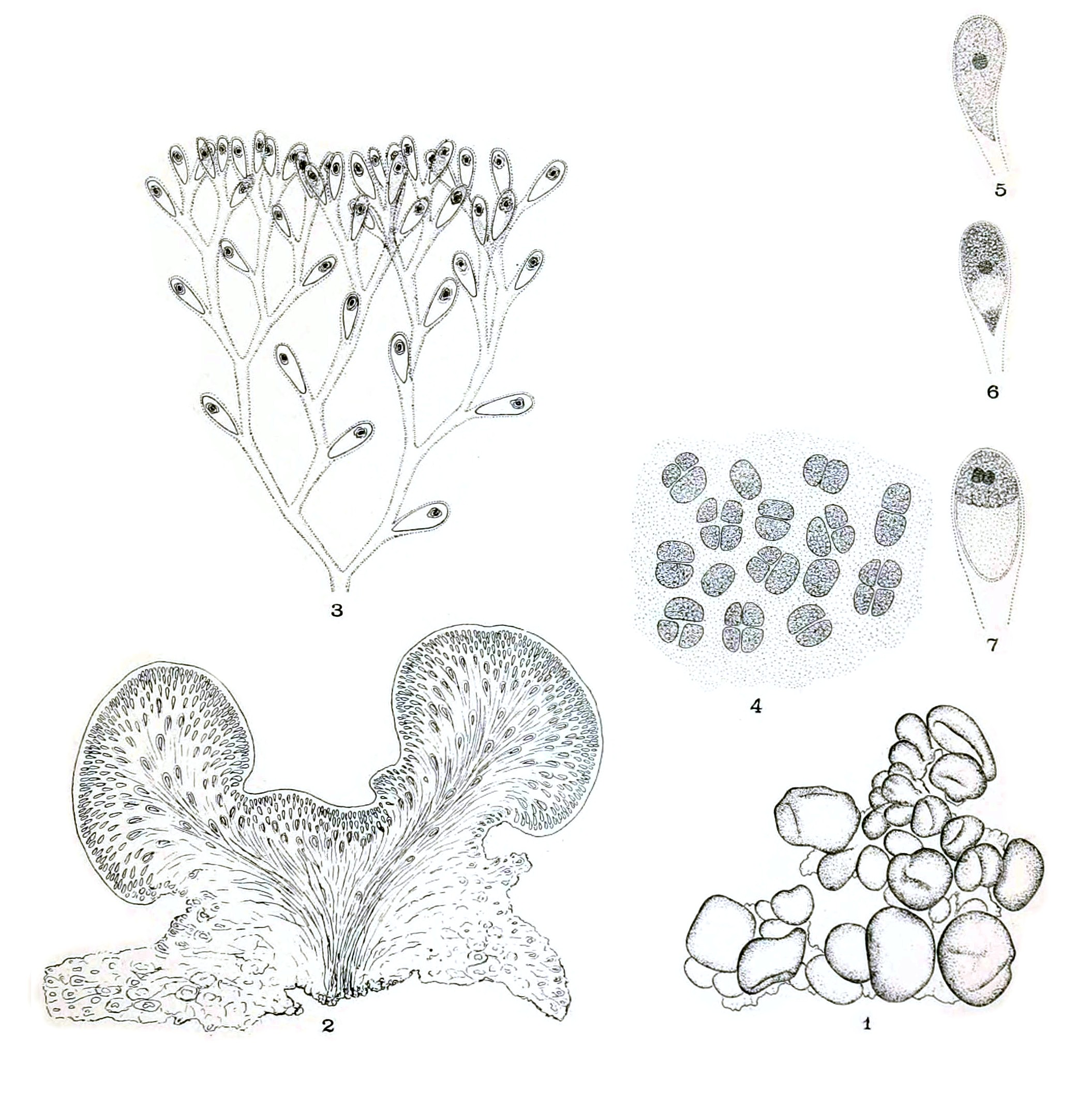
- Collinsiella tuberculata

Scientific classification
- Kingdom: Plantae
- Division: Chlorophyta
- Class: Ulvophyceae
- Order: Ulotrichales
- Family: Gomontiaceae
- Genus: Collinsiella; Setchell & Gardner

Species
- Collinsiella cava (Yendo) Printz; Collinsiella japonica (Yendo) Printz; Collinsiella tuberculata Setchell & N.L. Gardner

= Collinsiella =

Genus of algae

Collinsiella is a genus of green algae in the order Ulotrichales.

The genus name of Collinsiella is in honour of Frank Shipley Collins (1848–1920) was an American botanist and algologist specializing in the study of marine algae.

The genus was circumscribed by William Albert Setchell in Univ. Calif. Publ. Bot. Vol.1 on page 204 in 1903.
