= Agarose 3-glycanohydrolase =

Agarose 3-glycanohydrolase may refer to one of two enzymes:

- Agarase
- Alpha-agarase
