= Acrosiphonia coalita =

Scientific classification
- Kingdom: Plantae
- Division: Chlorophyta
- Class: Ulvophyceae
- Order: Ulotrichales
- Family: Ulotrichaceae
- Genus: Acrosiphonia
- Species: A. coalita

Binomial name
- Acrosiphonia coalita (Ruprecht) Scagel, Garbary, Golden et M.W. Hawkes

Species of green algae

Acrosiphonia coalita is a species of green algae.

== Description ==
The green thallus forms many 4–8 in (100–200 mm) long "rope-like strands from branched, uniseriate filaments. Branching is lateral, from sides of cells, and cells are longer than broad. The frayed rope appearance is caused by hook-shaped branches that entangle neighboring branches to form the rope-like strands;" the North Pacific distribution is from the Gulf of Alaska to central California.

== Habitat ==
The species is found on rock in the mid- to low intertidal in protected to semi-exposed habitats in spring and early summer.
