= Gomont (disambiguation) =

Gomont is a French commune in the department of Ardennes.

Gomont may also refer to:

- Maurice Gomont (1839-1909), a French phycologist who used the author abbreviation Gomont
- Pierre-Henry Gomont (born 1978), a French comics creator
- Marly-Gomont, a French commune in Aisne and Hauts-de-France
- "Marly-Gomont" (song), a single by French rapper Kamini about the commune

== See also ==
- Gomontia
- Gomontiaceae
- Gomon
- Gormond et Isembart
- Goumont (disambiguation)
