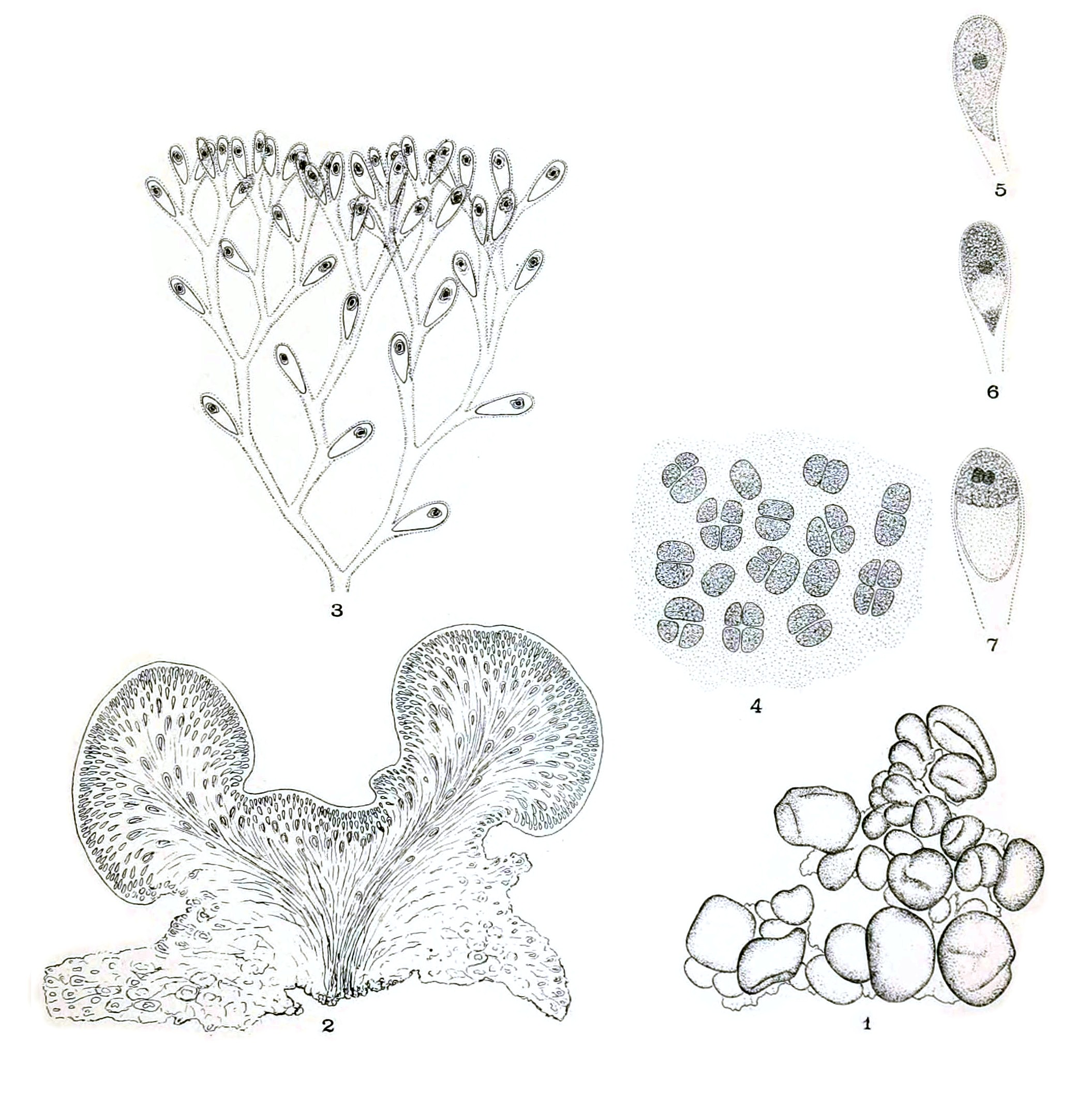

Scientific classification
- Kingdom: Plantae
- Division: Chlorophyta
- Class: Ulvophyceae
- Order: Ulotrichales
- Family: Gomontiaceae
- Genus: Collinsiella
- Species: C. tuberculata

Binomial name
- Collinsiella tuberculata Setchell & N.L. Gardner

= Collinsiella tuberculata =

Species of alga

Collinsiella tuberculata is a species of green algae. It is in the genus Collinsiella of the family Gomontiaceae.

It was named in honor of algologist Frank Shipley Collins.
