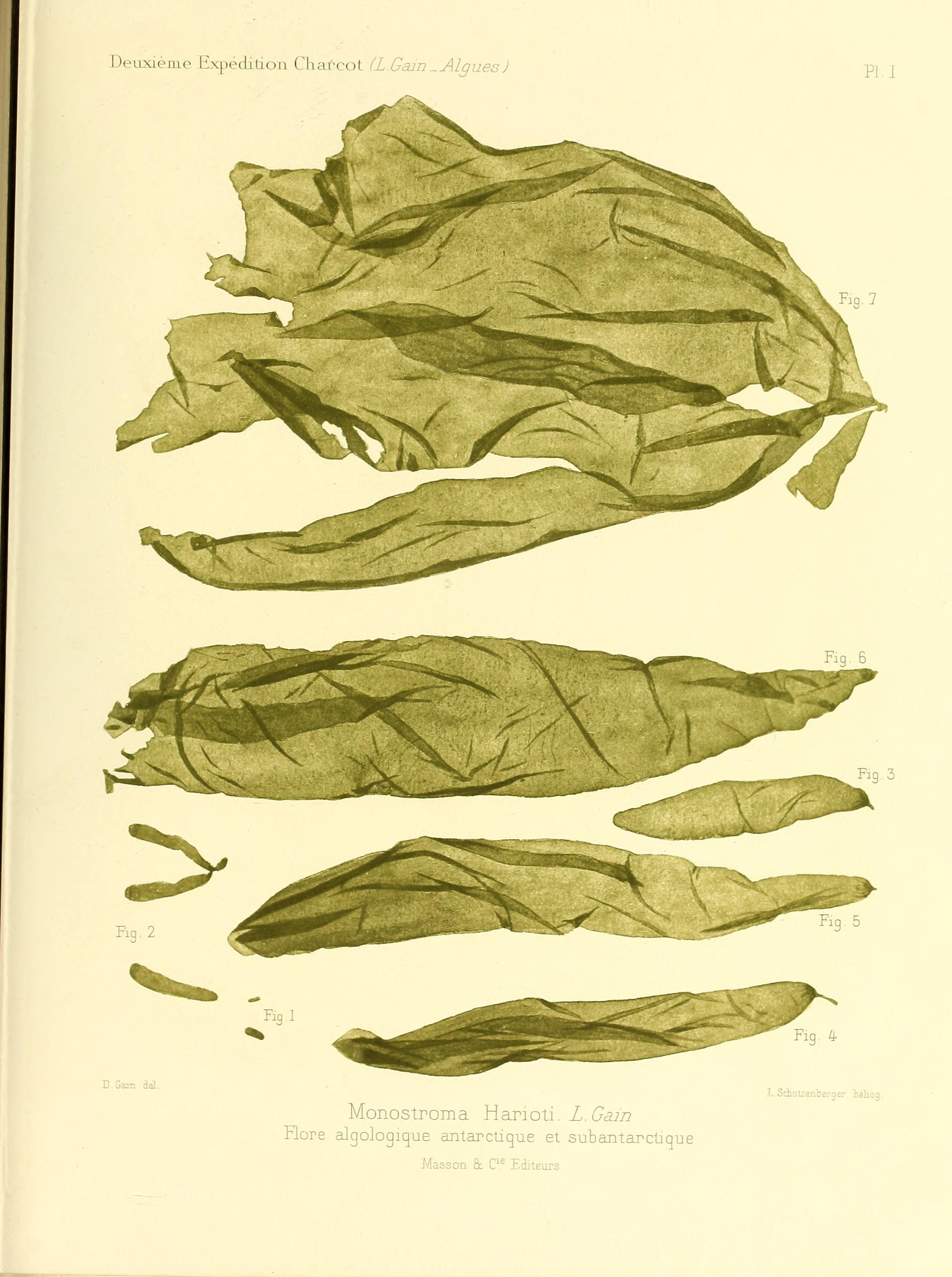
- Monostroma hariotii

Scientific classification
- Kingdom: Plantae
- Division: Chlorophyta
- Class: Ulvophyceae
- Order: Ulotrichales
- Family: Monostromataceae
- Genus: Monostroma; Thuret

Selected species
- Monostroma angicava; Monostroma arcticum; Monostroma kuroshiense; Monostroma grevillei; Monostroma nitidum

= Monostroma =

Genus of algae

Monostroma is a genus of marine green algae (seaweed) in the family Monostromataceae. As the name suggests, algae of this genus are monostromatic (single cell layered). Monostroma kuroshiense, an algae of this genus, is commercially cultivated in East Asia and South America for the edible product "hitoegusa-nori" or "hirohano-hitoegusa nori", popular sushi wraps. Monostroma oligosaccharides with degree of polymerization 6 prepared by agarase digestion from Monostroma nitidum polysaccharides have been shown to be an effective prophylactic agent during in vitro and in vivo tests against Japanese encephalitis viral infection. The sulfated oligosaccharides from Monostroma seem to be promising candidates for further development as antiviral agents. The genus Monostroma is the most widely cultivated genus among green seaweeds.

== Classification ==
Species-level classification within this genus is quite problematic and no consensus exists among algal taxonomists. This genus is oftentimes referred as "Gayralia", however Gayralia and Monostroma are congeneric. A number of monostromatic algal species have been removed from this genus, including Kornmannia, Ulvopsis and Capsosiphon. Currently accepted working-classification of monostromatic green algae is provided as a figure. A taxonomic field-identification dichotomous key for this genus is available

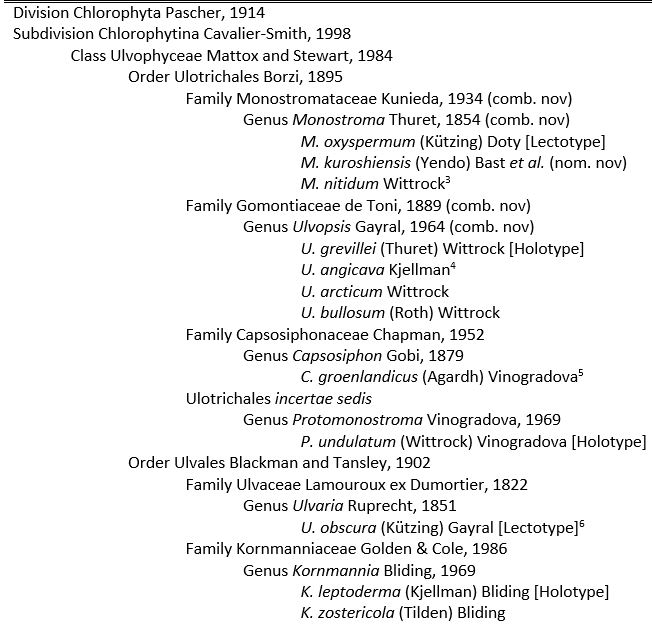
Currently accepted taxonomy of Monostromatic Green Algae

== Genetics ==
Largest phylogeographic assessment of this genus yet conducted in SW Japan revealed existence of sympatric speciation in a panmictic population; the first report of sympatric speciation in algae

== Ecophysiology, cultivation and life cycle ==
A number of peer-reviewed scientific literature exists on the ecophysiology of this algal genus. Natural and cultivated sexually reproducing environmental samples, as well as sexually reproducing and serendipitously discovered asexually reproducing ecotypes of monostromatic green alga from Tosa Bay, Japan are conspecific (belong to the same species). Patterns of seasonal fluctuations in its thallus lengths were habitat specific and recur annually. Both appearance and decay of thalli were earlier at high saline habitats, suggesting that salinity positively influences either maturation of sporophytes or senescence of gametophytes. Results from life cycle, thallus ontogeny, gametangial ontogeny and phylogenetic analyses suggest that this algal genus is evolutionarily affiliated in the order Ulotrichales. Type of life cycle is not a valid diagnostic character for the species circumscription in Monostromataceae

Seaweed farmer

== Reproduction and sex-ratio ==
Gametogenesis in this alga occurs in discontinuous patches along the frontal apex and the gametes release synchronously in a posterior faced linear fashion by the dehiscence of gametangial sheath, leading to the thallic disintegration. The overall primary sex ratio of this alga is about 1:1 which is likely to reflect Fisherian selection.

== Culinary use ==
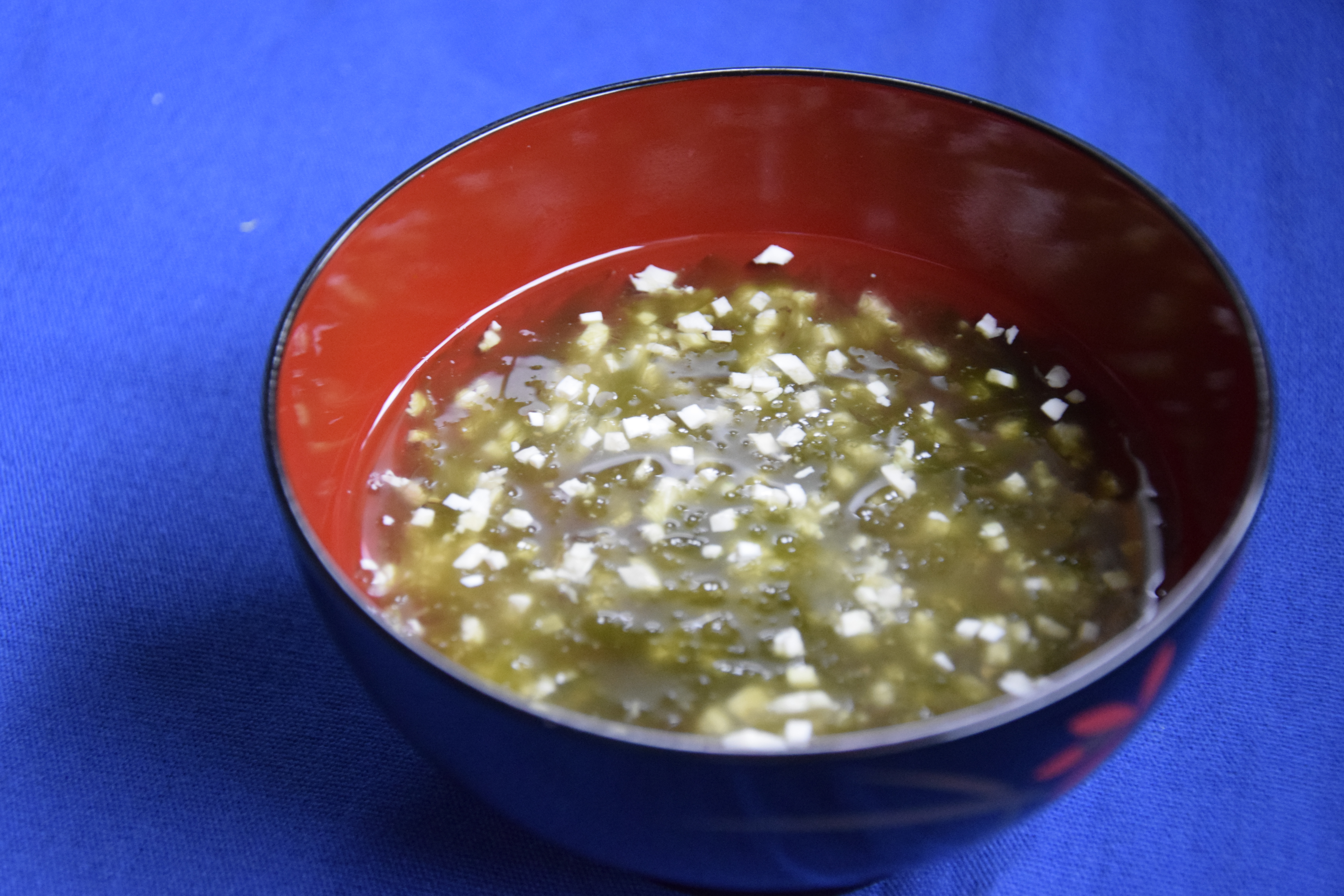
Soup made using edible Monostroma, common in Okinawan cuisine

In Korea, edible Monostroma species such as Monostroma nitidum are called parae (파래), and eaten as a namul vegetable.

In Japan, dried Monostroma kuroshiense called aonori is used to season dishes such as takoyaki and okonomiyaki. In Okinawa, it is used in a soup called āsa nu ushiru.
