= Crinalium epipsammum =

Scientific classification
- Domain: Bacteria
- Kingdom: Bacillati
- Phylum: Cyanobacteriota
- Class: Cyanophyceae
- Order: Oscillatoriales
- Family: Gomontiellaceae
- Genus: Crinalium
- Species: C. epipsammum

Binomial name
- Crinalium epipsammum Winder, Stal & Mur, 1992

Species of bacterium

Crinalium epipsammum is a rare filamentous, non-heterocystous, non-motile, terrestrial cyanobacterium. The species is highly drought-resistant and was first identified from its role in forming crusts on coastal sand dunes in the Netherlands and was later reported in the British Isles. This species is related to Crinalium magnum.

Characteristics

Crinalium epipsammum was previously enriched from samples of the coastal crust. C. epipsammum cells grow in trichomes, which are chains of cells that form a filamentous structure. C. epipsammum is sensitive to high salt concentrations but cannot grow effectively in freshwater conditions either. As determined by de Winder et al., C. epipsammum is non-motile. This was shown by covering the lid of a petri dish containing C epipsammum but leaving the sides uncovered to allow light to pass through the edges. The sample showed no signs of reacting to the light (i.e., moving towards the sides of the petri dish), meaning the trichomes could not move with the light. The trichomes of C. epipsammum are uncommonly elliptically shaped. Based on 16S rRNA gene homology, a close relative of C. epipsammum is Crinalium magnum.
