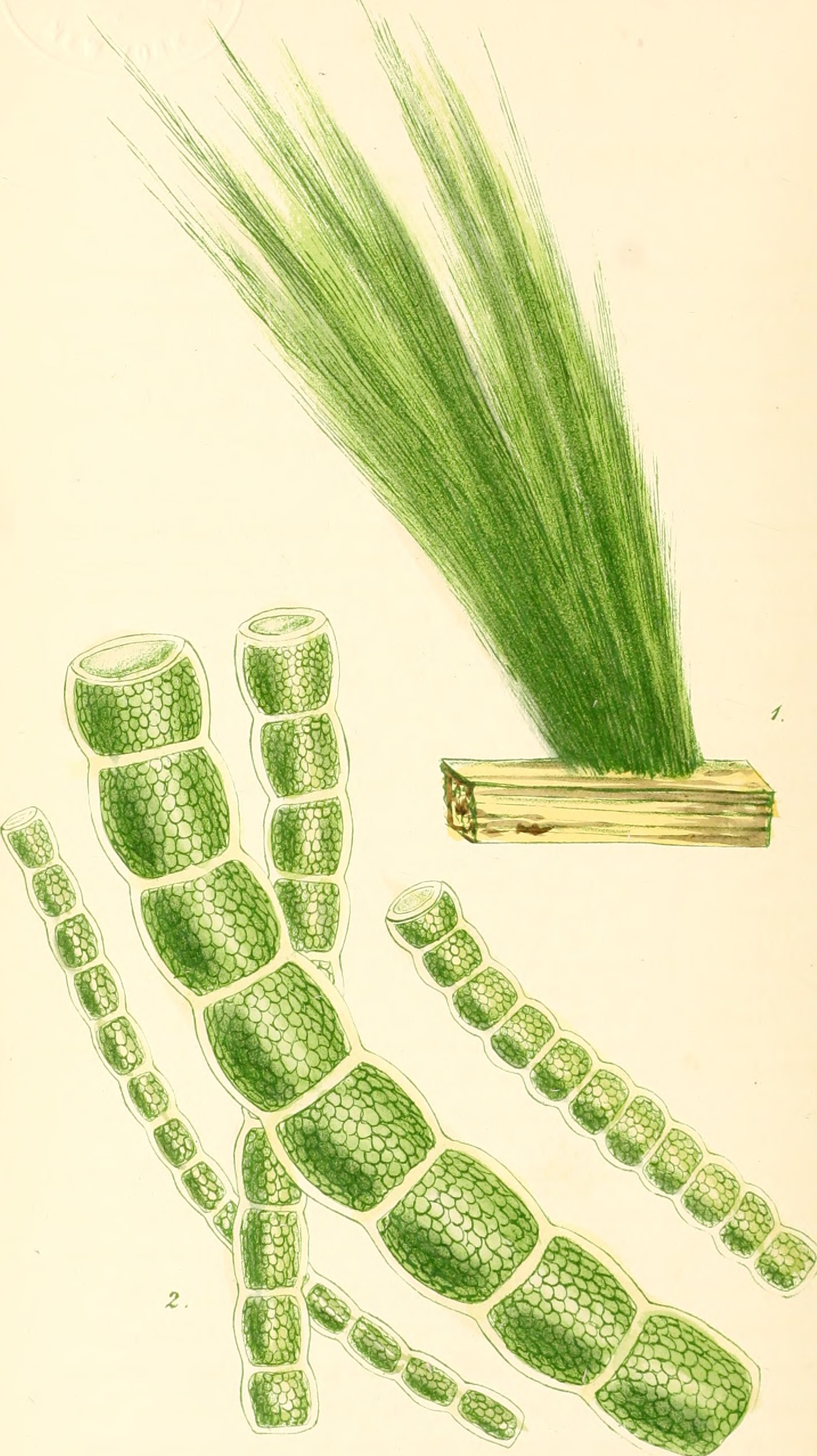
- Urospora wormskioldii

Scientific classification
- Kingdom: Plantae
- Division: Chlorophyta
- Class: Ulvophyceae
- Order: Ulotrichales
- Family: Ulotrichaceae
- Genus: Urospora; Areschoug

Species
- Urospora penicilliformis; Urospora sp. AB58; Urospora sp. UP52; Urospora sp. U122; Urospora wormskioldii; Urospora neglecta

= Urospora (alga) =

Genus of algae

Urospora is a genus of green algae in the family Ulotrichaceae. In 2022, a member of genus Urospora was shown to be a photobiont partner for a crustose seashore lichen in the family Verrucariaceae. This is the first time that a member of this genus, or of the order Ulotrichales, has been recorded as a photobiont.
