= Chlorothrix (alga) =

Scientific classification
- Kingdom: Plantae
- Division: Chlorophyta
- Class: Ulvophyceae
- Order: Ulotrichales
- Family: Ulotrichaceae
- Genus: Chlorothrix; Y.Berger-Perrot

Species
- Chlorothrix sp. ChloPac47SI; Chlorothrix sp. C167

Synonyms
- Chlorothrix Berg.-Perr. 1982

Genus of algae

Chlorothrix is a genus of green algae in the family Ulotrichaceae.
