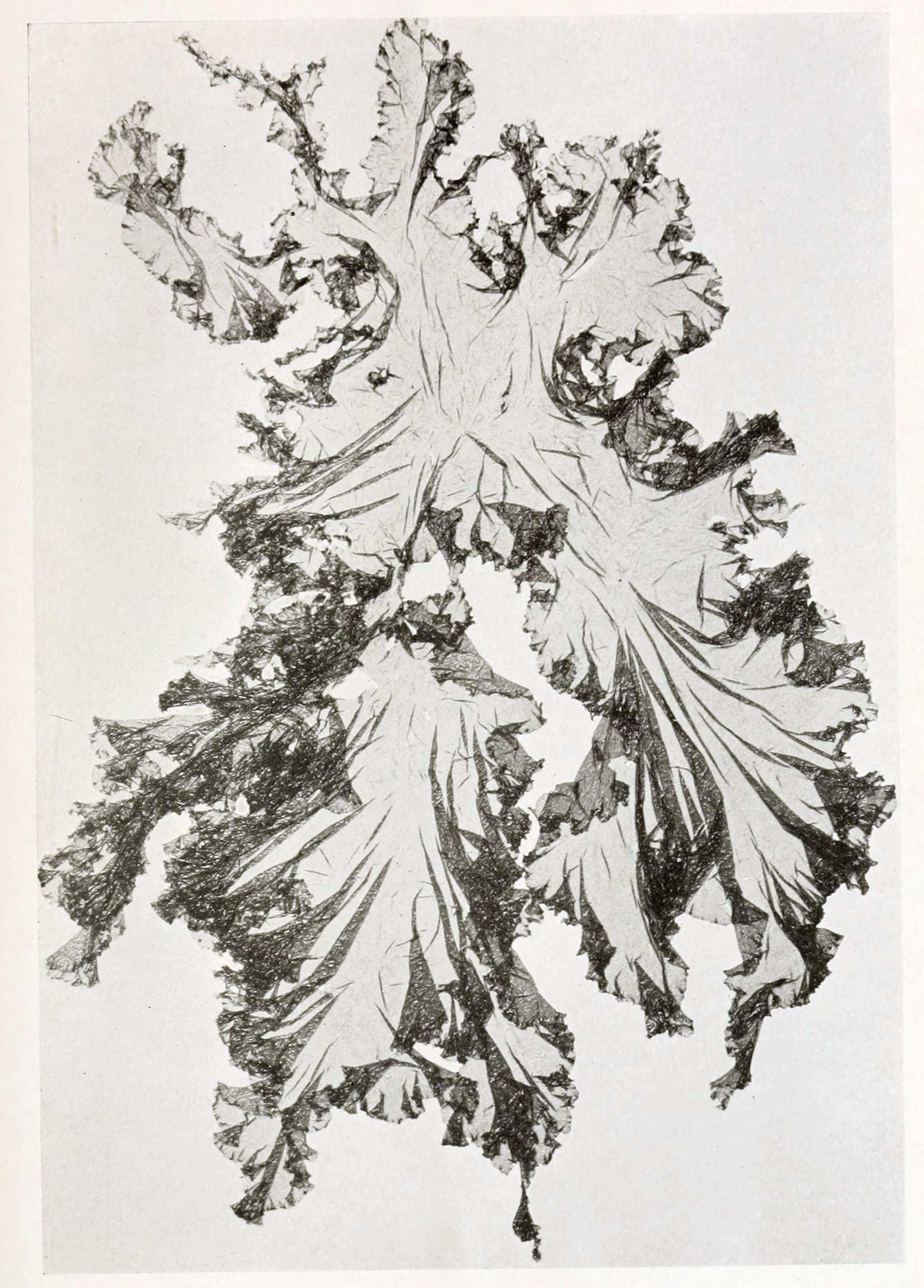
- Protomonostroma undulatum

Scientific classification
- Clade: Viridiplantae
- Division: Chlorophyta
- Class: Ulvophyceae
- Order: Ulotrichales
- Family: Ulotrichaceae
- Genus: Protomonostroma; K.L.Vinogradova

Species
- Protomonostroma undulatum

= Protomonostroma =

Genus of algae

Protomonostroma is a genus of green algae in the family Ulotrichaceae.
