= Hougoumont (disambiguation) =

Hougoumont is a fortified farm that was held by Wellington's army in the Battle of Waterloo.

Hougoumont, Hougomont, or variation may also refer to:

- Hougoumont (ship), a convict ship;
- Hougomont (barque), a barque built in 1897
- Biere d' Hougoumont, a Biere de Garde (strong ale) made by Brewery Ommegang of Cooperstown, NY, United States
- Hougomont, a painting of the Battle of Waterloo at Hougoumont by Robert Gibb

== See also ==
- Goumont (disambiguation)
- Gomont (disambiguation)
