= Eugomontia =

Scientific classification
- Kingdom: Plantae
- Division: Chlorophyta
- Class: Ulvophyceae
- Order: Ulotrichales
- Family: Gomontiaceae
- Genus: Eugomontia; Kornmann

Species
- Eugomontia sacculata

Genus of algae

Eugomontia is a genus of green algae in the order Ulotrichales.
