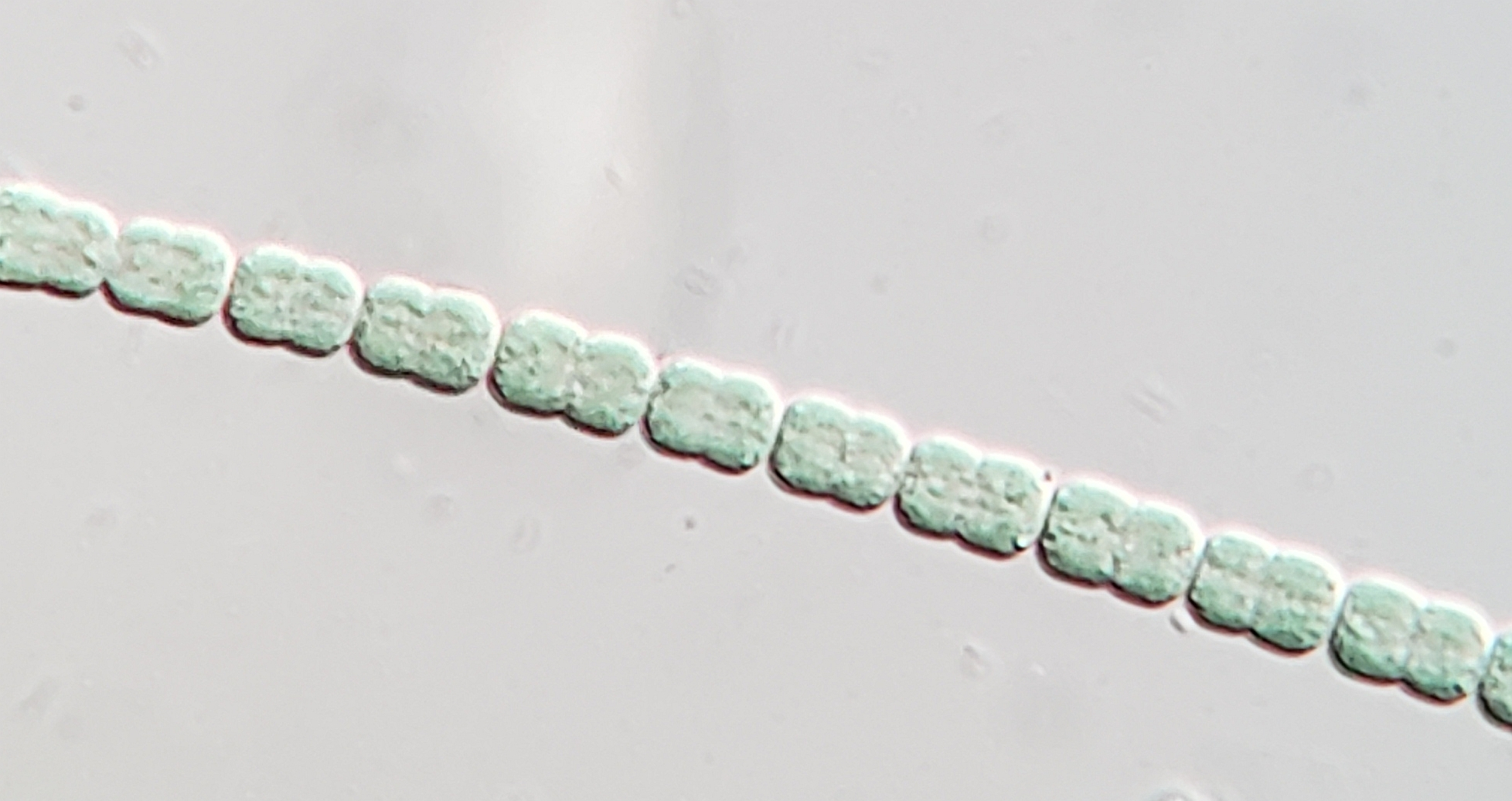
- Komvophoron constrictum

Scientific classification
- Domain: Bacteria
- Phylum: Cyanobacteria
- Class: Cyanophyceae
- Order: Oscillatoriales
- Family: Borziaceae
- Genus: Komvophoron; Anagnostidis & Komárek, 1988

= Komvophoron =

Genus of bacteria

Komvophoron is a genus of cyanobacteria belonging to the family Borziaceae.

The genus has almost cosmopolitan distribution.

Species:

- Komvophoron constrictum (Szafer) Anagnostidis & Komárek
- Komvophoron epiphyticum Anagn. & Komárek
- Komvophoron minutum (Skuja) Anagn. & Komárek
- Komvophoron pallildum (Skuja) Anagn. & Komárek
- Komvophoron schmidlei (Jaag) Anagn. & Komárek
- Komvophoron siderophilum (Skuja) Anagn. & Komárek
