= Gloeotilopsis =

Scientific classification
- Kingdom: Plantae
- Division: Chlorophyta
- Class: Ulvophyceae
- Order: Ulotrichales
- Family: Ulotrichaceae
- Genus: Gloeotilopsis; Iyengar & Philipose

Type species
- Gloeotilopsis planctonica Iyengar & Philipose

Species
- Gloeotilopsis planctonica; Gloeotilopsis sterilis

Genus of algae

Gloeotilopsis is a genus of green algae, in the order Ulotrichales. It contains two species. The first, G. planctonica is found in freshwater plankton and was described from India. The second, G. sterilis, was described from soil in Dauphin Island, Alabama.

== Description ==
Gloeotilopsis consists of unbranched and uniseriate filaments without a mucilaginous sheath. The filaments are short, about 2–16 cells long and readily fragmenting into shorter pieces. Cells are cylindrical and elongated with rounded ends. The cell wall is thin and hyaline. Cells contain a single parietal chloroplast which encircles about three-quarters of the cell and occupies most of the length of the cell; the chloroplast has one (or rarely two) pyrenoids.

Vegetative reproduction occurs by fragmentation of filaments. Asexual reproduction occurs by the formation of zoospores from ordinary cell. Up to eight (or 16) zoospores are produced per cell; they are ovate, with two flagella and a small anterior papilla, a cup-shaped chloroplast with a single pyrenoid, and a single eyespot. The zoospores exit the zoosporangia through a tear in the cell wall; the empty cell wall is composed of H-shaped pieces similar to that of Microspora. Aplanospores may be produced instead of zoospores. Sexual reproduction is unknown in Gloeotilopsis.

Gloeotilopsis is similar in morphology to Stichococcus and Gloeotila, but differs from both genera in having chloroplasts with pyrenoids.
