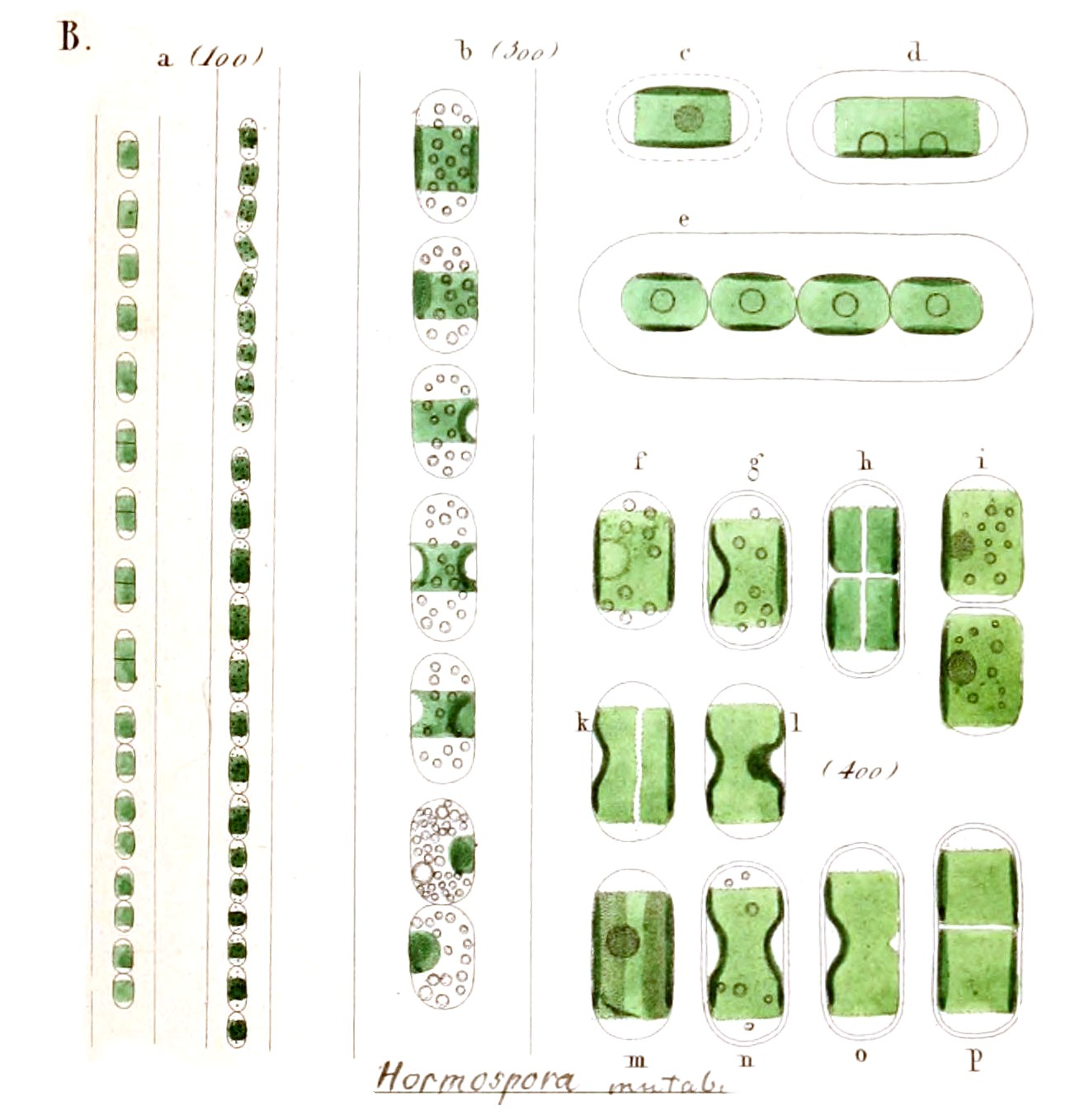

Scientific classification
- Kingdom: Plantae
- Division: Chlorophyta
- Class: Trebouxiophyceae
- Order: Chlorellales
- Family: Chlorellaceae
- Genus: Geminella; Turpin

Type species
- Geminella interrupta Turpin

Species
- See below

= Geminella (alga) =

Genus of algae

Geminella is a genus of green algae in the phylum Chlorophyta. Once considered part of the order Ulotrichales, molecular phylogenetics have shown that Geminella and related genera (such as Gloeotilopsis) form a well-supported clade within the class Trebouxiophyceae.

Geminella is most often found in fresh water such as swamps, ponds, and lakes, and is often associated with desmids. It has also been reported from terrestrial habitats.

== Description ==
Geminella consists of uniseriate, unbranched filaments either free-floating or attached to a substrate. The cells are generally separated and equidistant, or may be lying in pairs, and are surrounded by a thick mucilaginous sheath. Cells are cylindrical to ellipsoidal to barrel-shaped, with broadly rounded ends. Each cell contains a single parietal chloroplast which is girdle-like or laminate and partially encircling the protoplast; a single central pyrenoid is usually present.

Reproduction occurs by the fragmentation of filaments, or by the production of akinetes with thick brown cell walls. Sexual reproduction or zoospores have not been definitively observed.

It is similar to Gloeotila, and sometimes considered to be the same genus. Some authors separate the two genera based on morphological evidence, with Gloeotila being distinguished by having strictly contiguous cells or the absence of pyrenoids; however, the difference between the two genera is blurry and needs further investigation.

== Species ==
Geminella includes the following species:

- Geminella amphigranulata
- Geminella crenulatocollis
- Geminella ellipsoidea
- Geminella interrupta
- Geminella longispira
- Geminella minor
- Geminella mutabilis
- Geminella ordinata
- Geminella printzii
- Geminella smithii
- Geminella spirochroma
- Geminella subtilissima
- Geminella turfosa
- Geminella verrucosa
