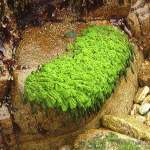
- Acrosiphonia arcta

Scientific classification
- Kingdom: Plantae
- Division: Chlorophyta
- Class: Ulvophyceae
- Order: Ulotrichales
- Family: Ulotrichaceae
- Genus: Acrosiphonia; J.Agardh

Species
- Acrosiphonia sp. SAG-127.80; Acrosiphonia arcta; Acrosiphonia coalita; Acrosiphonia sp. AH/Sk/BI/Bm; Acrosiphonia sp. Sk5; Acrosiphonia duriuscula; Acrosiphonia spinescens

= Acrosiphonia =

Genus of algae

Acrosiphonia is a genus of green algae in the family Ulotrichaceae.
