= Felix Bast =

Indian scientist

Felix Bast PhD, FLS
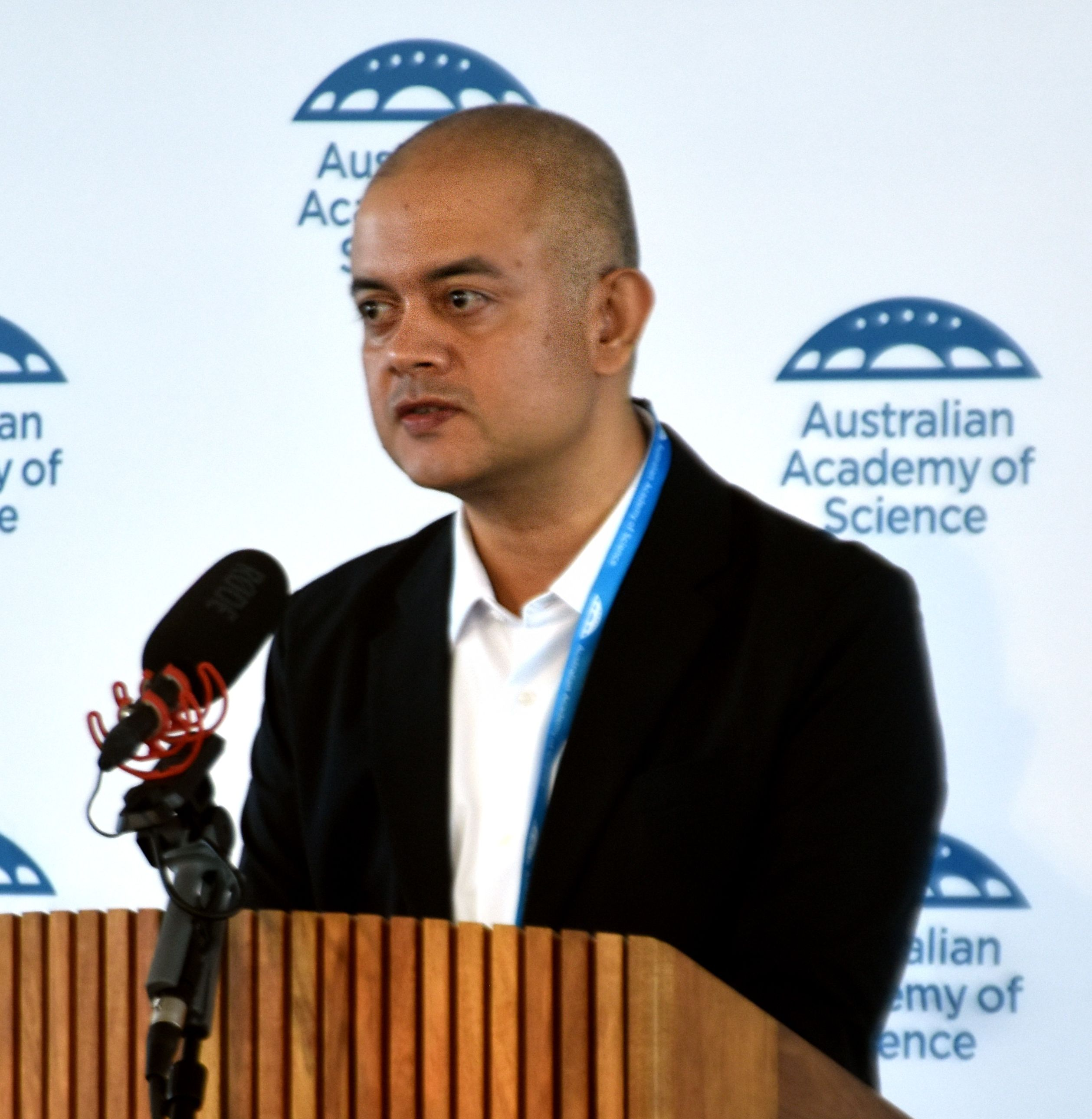
- Felix Bast speaking at the Australian Academy of Science, Canberra, 2025
- Born: Vadakke Madam Sreejith Nambissan; 27 May 1980 (age 46); Payyanur
- Education: Kōchi University (Japan, PhD)
- Awards: Inspired Teacher (2015), Fellow of Linnean Society (2022)
- Scientific career
- Fields: Phycology; Taxonomy; Science Communication; Antarctic Biology
- Workplaces: Central University of Punjab
- Website: www.felixbast.com

Felix Bast, born as V. M. Sreejith Nambissan, is an Indian phycologist, author, and public educator based at the Central University of Punjab. He is the member of the high-profile advisory council of International Science Council, Paris, and has discovered seven new species of plants from India and Antarctica. He had also been inducted by the United Nations into the high-profile “UN-SDG-7 Reference Group” to shape international-level policy for clean and sustainable energy.

== Early life and education ==
Felix Bast was born in Payyannur, Kerala, India, to the Vadakke Madam house, a Malayali Brahmin family. He was born with the name Sreejith Vadakke Madam Nambissan and because of an inspiration from philosopher Voltaire, changed it to Felix Bast in 2003. He attended government Boys' High School in Payyannur. Subsequently, he completed BSc in microbiology from Kannur University with the university first rank and MSc in biotechnology with First Class from the University of Madras Guindy Campus. Bast was associated with the Department of Chemical Engineering, Indian Institute of Technology, Bombay as a PhD student and CSIR-JRF. In 2005 he left IIT Bombay to accept the Japanese Government Doctoral Scholarship (MEXT) and completed PhD in Marine Biology from Kochi University, Shikoku, Japan. Other institutes where he took training include Friday Harbor Laboratories (University of Washington, USA) and Marine Biological Association of UK laboratories, Plymouth, UK.

== Career and research ==
Felix Bast is a full professor at the Central University of Punjab, India. He also served as an expedition scientist for Indian Antarctic Mission 2016-17 and conducted research at Bharati Station and Maitri Station, Antarctica. Bast authored popular science book Voyage to Antarctica detailing his experiences as part of the Indian Antarctic Mission. He served as a guest scientist at Leibniz Centre for Tropical Marine Research, Bremen, Germany in 2018–19. Bast is a renowned algal taxonomist having discovered several new species from India and Antarctica. Species that he and his research team discovered include:

- Acetabularia jalakanyakae (Dasycladales): A unicellular marine green algae from Andaman & Nicobar Islands, India
- Bryum bharatiense (Bryaceae): A moss species from East Antarctica that survive on penguin excrements
- Hypnea indica (Hypneaceae): A marine red alga from Tamil Nadu, India
- Hypnea bullata (Hypneaceae): A marine red alga from Gujarat, India
- Ulva paschima (Ulvaceae): A marine green alga from Indian West Coast
- Ulva uniseriata (Ulvaceae): A marine green alga from West Bengal, India
- Cladophora goensis (Cladophorales): A marine green alga from Goa, India

In addition, he is the taxonomic authority of Monostroma kuroshiense, one of the extensively cultivated edible green algae in the Kuroshio coasts of southern Japan. As of 2023 nine research scholars have been awarded with PhD degrees under his supervision, and he served as Principal Investigator for 15 research grants with a combined amount of INR 2.13 Crore.

In 2025, Bast was appointed to a new ISC Advisory Council, which was created for the Regional Focal Point for Asia and the Pacific.

== Other activities ==
- Bast founded Young Academy of India and its nation-wide ideological matchmaking program MentX. Young Academy of India is one of the largest young academies in the world, with over 15,000 active members. The YAI is a member organization of the International Science Council. At present, Bast is serving as the President of the YAI.
- Bast is a known Science Communicator in India, with frequent contributions in Resonance, Science Reporter, The Hindu and so on. He also releases an award-winning monthly science show called Curiosity through his YouTube Channel-one of the most popular yet non-monetized science-based channels from India.
- Bast is involved with SWAYAM, a flagship online education program of the Government of India as a coordinator of a post-graduate level course "Biostatistics and Mathematical Biology". In 2020, this course was ranked as the 7th best MOOC in the world. As of 2023, the course had over 13,000 enrollees.

== Recognition ==
Bast is an elected fellow of the Linnean Society of London, the most prestigious society for taxonomists in the world. Bast is a member and expert panellist of the International Science Council, Paris- an apex body of science academies in the world. In 2023 he was elected into International Science Council's Asia Pacific Focal Point as a member of advisory council. In 2022, he has become an expert member of International Union for Conservation of Nature. He served as an in-residence intern with the President of India at Rashtrapati Bhavan, New Delhi in 2015 and received Inspired Teacher recognition- the highest recognition for university faculty in the Republic of India. Other recognitions include: Teaching Innovator Award from Ministry of Education, Government of India in 2019 DST Inspire Faculty Award from Department of Science and Technology, Government of India, NAM-Leibniz Guest scientist award 2018 to do sabbatical at Leibniz Centre for Tropical Marine Research, Bremen, Germany and Elected as national core committee representative of Indian National Young Academy of Sciences, New Delhi (2020) In 2025, Bast has been inducted by the United Nations into the high-profile “UN-SDG-7 Reference Group” to shape international-level policy for clean and sustainable energy.

== Bibliography ==
As of 2026, Bast authored 7 books:

1. Bast F (2024) അന്റാർട്ടിക്കൻ പര്യടനം ("Antarttikkan Paryatanam" in Malayalam). ISBN 978-93-6100-560-2
2. Bast F (2023) Biostatistics and Mathematical Biology. ISBN 978-93-5606-626-7
3. Bast F (2022) Life Skills: A Manual of Critical Thinking and Soft Skills. ISBN 978-1-63640-637-4
4. Bast F (2022) Trees of Ramayana. ISBN 978-93-91734-67-1
5. Bast F (2015) Voyage to Antarctica. ISBN 978-81-7480-312-2
6. Bast F (2015) The Arctic Circle: Six remarkable short stories for the young adults covering the crux of personal productivity. ISBN 979-8-4828-0960-0
7. Bast F (2014) Creatures of India: guide to animals in India with up-to-date systematics. ISBN 978-93-81274-48-4

As per Google Scholar, he has authored 137 scholarly articles.
