= Homoeothrix =

Homoeothrix may refer to:

- Homoeothrix (cyanobacteria), a genus of bacteria in the order Oscillatoriales
- Homoeothrix (fly), a genus of flies in the family Tephritidae
