= Geminella =

Geminella is the scientific name for several genera of organisms and may refer to:

- Geminella (alga), a genus of green algae
- Geminella (bryozoan) Szczechura, 1994, a genus of fossil bryozoans
- Geminella (hydrozoan) Billard, 1925, a genus of hydrozoans
