= Pseudendocloniopsis =

Scientific classification
- Kingdom: Plantae
- Division: Chlorophyta
- Class: Ulvophyceae
- Order: Ulotrichales
- Family: Ulotrichaceae
- Genus: Pseudendocloniopsis; Vischer

Species
- Pseudendocloniopsis botryoides

Genus of algae

Pseudendocloniopsis is a genus of green algae in the order Ulotrichales.
