= Goumont =

Goumont or variation may refer to:

- Hougoumont, formerly named "Goumont" (also 'Gomont'), a fortified farming estate involved in the Battle of Waterloo
- Marly Goumont (now Marly-Gomont), Aisne, Hauts-de-France, France; a commune that contained the medieval village of Marly and medieval hamlet of Goumont
- Chemin du Goumont, a path at the Memorial of Waterloo 1815

== See also ==
- Hougoumont (disambiguation)
- Gomont (disambiguation)
