= Homoeothrix (cyanobacteria) =

Scientific classification
- Domain: Bacteria
- Kingdom: Bacillati
- Clade: "Cyanobacteria/Melainabacteria clade"
- Phylum: Cyanobacteria
- Class: Cyanophyceae
- Order: Oscillatoriales
- Family: Homoeotrichaceae
- Genus: Homoeothrix (Thuret) Kirchner 1898

Genus of bacteria

Homoeothrix is a genus of cyanobacteria.
