= The Green Algae of North America =

1909 book on algae

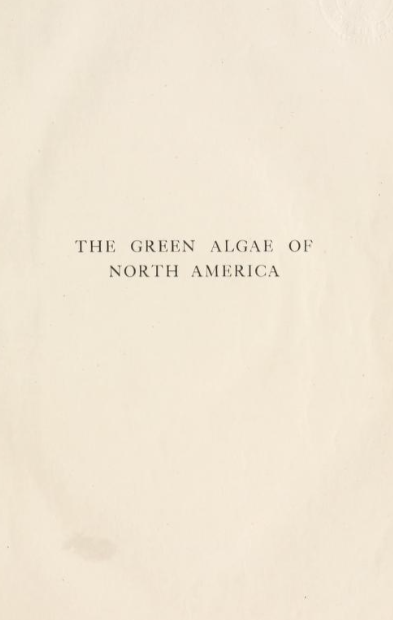
- Title page for The Green Algae of North America (1909)
- Author: Frank Shipley Collins
- Language: English
- Genre: Non-fiction
- Publisher: Tufts College
- Publication date: 1909
- Publication place: United States

The Green Algae of North America is an influential early book on American green algae written by algologist Frank Shipley Collins. It was published in 1909 by Tufts College.
