= National Award for Teachers (India) =

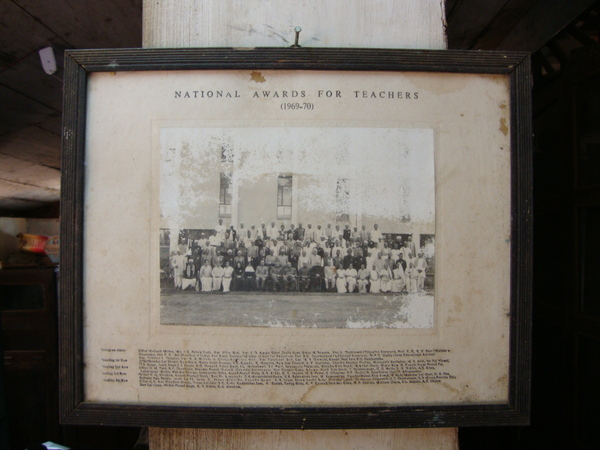
National award Recipients on September 5, 1969 with the President of India, V.V. Giri

National Award to Teachers is the National award to the Teachers, being awarded by the President of India on 5 September (Teacher's Day) every year to give public recognition to meritorious teachers working in primary, middle and secondary schools in India. A similar recognition for university teacher has been instituted in 2015 in the form of Inspired Teacher recognition. Instituted in 1958, there are 366 awards out of which 20 awards are reserved for Sanskrit, Persian and Arabic teachers. Each State/Union Territory/Organization has an earmarked quota based on the number of teachers. The Scheme also covers teachers of the schools affiliated to CBSE including teachers of independent affiliated schools situated abroad, ICSCE, Sainik School, KVS, NVS, CTSA and schools run by the Atomic Energy Education Society.

From the award year 2001, 33 ‘Special Awards’ have been earmarked to teachers promoting integrated inclusive education in schools and promote the education of children with disabilities in regular schools by States/UTs and other school system.

The teachers of following categories will be considered for award:

- Teachers with disabilities working in regular schools.
- Special teacher or trained general teachers who may have done outstanding work for Inclusive Education.

The selection is made by a State level Selection Committee/Central Award Committee presided over by Director (Education)/Head of the Organization with a nominee of the Union Government as a member. The names of the teachers as recommended by the Committee are forwarded by the State Government / Organizations in order of merit. The Government of India makes the final selection on the basis of merit. The award carries a medal, certificate, and INR 50,000/- as award money.

The Government, from the Award Year 2004 has approved that one family member of the awardee teacher would also be treated as State Guests during their stay in Delhi for the function and their expenses would be borne by the Department.

For the award year 2005, 435 teachers were selected for the National Award – 2005 by Hon’ble President. This includes 81 female teachers, 8 teachers from Sanskrit, 3 teachers from Arabic/Persian schools and 14 teachers who have been selected for special award.

In year 2021, total 152 teachers were shortlisted from different States/UTs/Organizations of India and 44 were selected for the National Award.
