= Atsuko Betchaku =

Japanese pacifist and teacher

Atsuko Betchaku (16 February 1960 – 2 February 2017) was a Japanese pacifist and teacher known for her 140,000 Origami Cranes Project in Scotland.

== Early life ==
Betchaku was born in Japan on the island of Shikoku to parents Misao and Toshio Betchaku. She also had a brother named Yuji.

Betchaku went to Kochi University to become a primary school teacher (1982) and in 1991 she was awarded an MA in education from the University of Tokio.

== Academic work ==
Betchaku was awarded a PhD by the History of Education department in the University of Edinburgh in 2006. The title of her PhD thesis was 'The Formation and Impact of the Scottish Evangelicals' Programme for Working-class Education, 1818–1846, Including its Influence in Post-meiji Japan'. In 2007 Betchaku published the article 'Thomas Chalmers, David Stow and the St John's Experiment: A Study in Educational Influence in Scotland and Beyond 1819 c. 1850' in the Journal of Scottish Historical Studies.

== Creative and social contributions ==
=== Origami Cranes Project ===
Atsuko started the 140,000 Origami Cranes Project in 2015. She visualised the project as an expression of hope for those affected by the atomic bombing of Hiroshima and Nagasaki. Atsuko's project also highlights the Treaty to Prohibit Nuclear Weapons – the Ban Treaty.

=== Ishinomaki Fund ===
Atsuko also participated in the Ishinomaki Fund as its committee president. She led the committee during the concert that happened during the 2013 Edinburgh Fringe Festival. She participated in the concert by reading a selection of Tōge Sankichi's work 'Poems of the Atomic Bomb'. Through her guidance, the fundraising concert was able to raise funds to support a high school girl who lost her only parent in the Great East Japan Earthquake of 2011.

=== Other social contributions ===
During her stay in the United Kingdom, Atsuko was also active in the Day After the Tsunami Committee and Save the Children, Japan.

== Death ==
Betchaku died in her home unexpectedly at the age of 56 in Edinburgh, Scotland where she had lived for 18 years.
