= Maurice Gomont =

French phycologist (1839–1909)

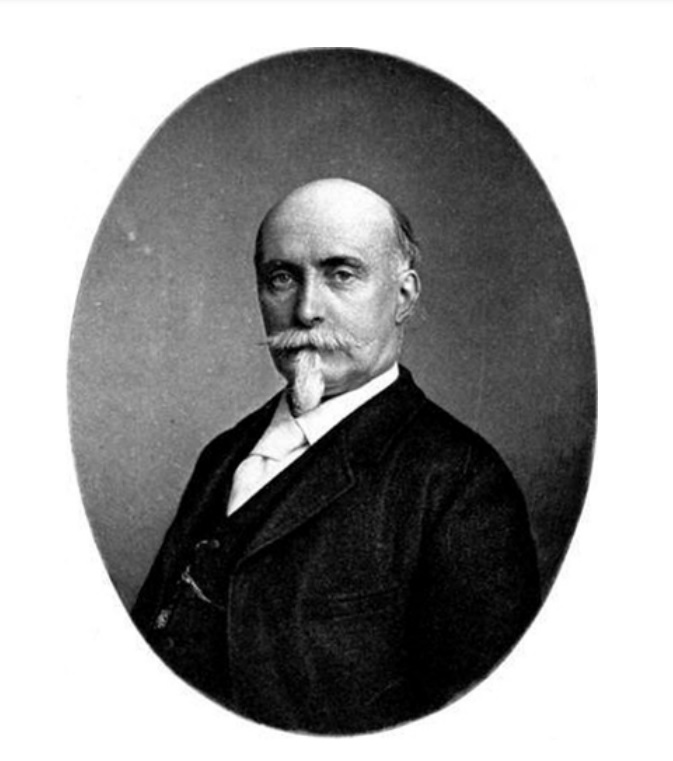
Maurice-Augustin Gomont

Maurice-Augustin Gomont (born 1839, in Rouen – died 1909, in Rouen) was a French phycologist.

== Works ==
- Gomont, M (1892). "Monographie des Oscillariées (Nostocacées Homocystées). Deuxième partie. - Lyngbyées". Annales des Sciences Naturelles, Botanique. 7 (16).

== Honours ==
- Gomontia, which is a genus of green algae, in the family Gomontiaceae and also Gomontiellaceae, which is a family of cyanobacteria, were both named in 1888 by botanists Jean-Baptiste Édouard Bornet and Charles Henri Marie Flahault after Maurice Gomont.
- Gomontiellaceae are a family of cyanobacteria, with Gomontiella, a species named in 1901.
