= Codiolum =

Scientific classification
- Kingdom: Plantae
- Division: Chlorophyta
- Class: Ulvophyceae
- Order: Ulotrichales
- Family: Ulotrichaceae
- Genus: Codiolum; A.Braun, 1855

Type species
- Codiolum gregarium A.Braun, 1855

Species
- Codiolum gregarium; Codiolum kuckuckiii

Genus of algae

Codiolum is a genus of green algae, in the family Ulotrichaceae. The term is also used for a life cycle stage in some algae.
