= Saccate =

Saccate is a term used in botany to describe plant parts that are shaped like a pouch or sack. Sometimes, when all members of a taxon share a property of having some part being saccate, this is referred to in the name of the taxon, such as the algae family Phaeosaccionaceae.
