= Homoeotrichaceae =

Scientific classification
- Domain: Bacteria
- Phylum: Cyanobacteria
- Class: Cyanophyceae
- Order: Oscillatoriales
- Family: Homoeotrichaceae; Elenkin

Genera
- Ammatoidea W. & G. S. West 1897; Homoeothrix (Thuret) Kirchner 1898; Phormidiochaete Komárek in Anagnostidis 2001; Tildenia Kosinskaja 1926

Family of bacteria

The Homoeotrichaceae are a family of cyanobacteria.
