= Working Key to the Genera of North American Algae =

1918 reference book

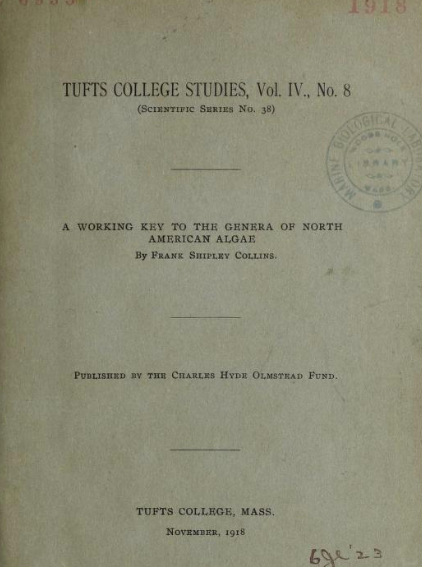
- Title page for Working Key to the Genera of North American Algae (1918)
- Author: Frank Shipley Collins
- Language: English
- Genre: Reference
- Publication date: 1918
- Publication place: United States

Working Key to the Genera of North American Algae is an influential early technical reference book on identification of algae in North America.

It was written by Frank Shipley Collins, and published in 1918.

== See also ==
- Flora of Northern America
