= Phaeosaccion =

Scientific classification
- Domain: Eukaryota
- Clade: Sar
- Clade: Stramenopiles
- Division: Ochrophyta
- Class: Phaeosacciophyceae
- Order: Phaeosacciales
- Family: Phaeosacciaceae
- Genus: Phaeosaccion; Farlow, 1882

Type species
- Phaeosaccion collinsii Farlow, 1882

Other species
- Phaeosaccion multiseriatum Andersen et al., 2020; Phaeosaccion okellyi Andersen et al., 2020; Phaeosaccion westermeieri Peters et al., 2024

Genus of algae

Phaeosaccion is a genus of algae with monostromatic tubular to saccate thalli, up to 20 centimetres (7.9 in) long and to 2 centimetres (0.79 in) wide. It is classified in the family Phaeosacciaceae. It is olive brown and resembles young plants of Scytosiphon. The type species in the genus is Phaeosaccion collinsii, a species of marine algae. It was first identified in a publication by W.G. Farlow in the article Notes on New England algae published in Bulletin of the Torrey Botanical Club in 1882. It was named in honor of Frank Shipley Collins. Phaeosacchion collinsii is red listed in Iceland as a vulnerable species (VU).
