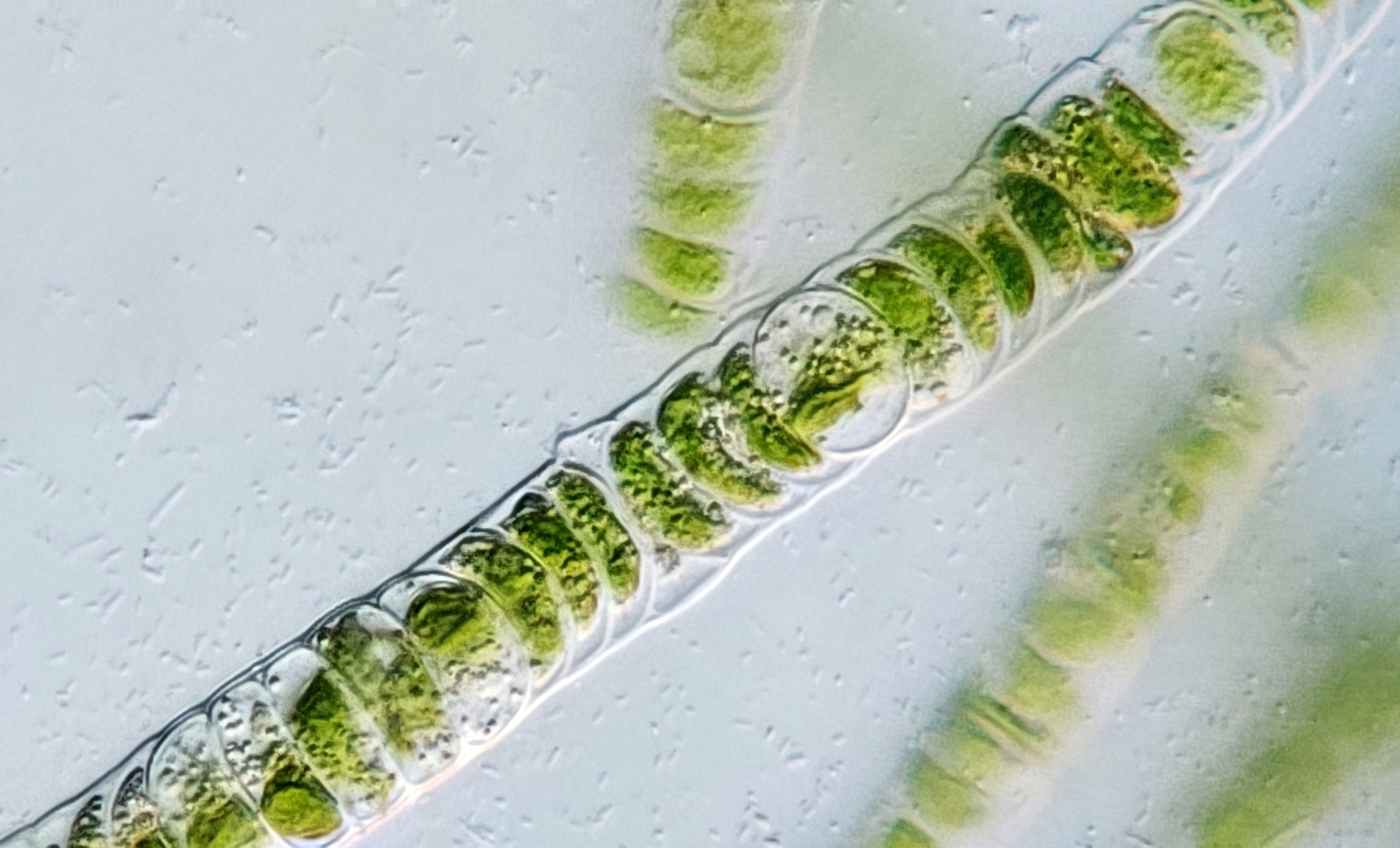
- Ulothrix zonata

Scientific classification
- Domain: Eukaryota
- Supergroup: Archaeplastida
- Clade: Viridiplantae
- Division: Chlorophyta
- Class: Ulvophyceae
- Order: Ulotrichales
- Family: Ulotrichaceae; Kützing

Genera
- Acrosiphonia J.Agardh; Capsosiphon Gobi; Chlorhormidium B.Fott; Chlorocystis L.Reinhard; Chlorothrix Y.Berger-Perrot; Codiolum A.Braun; Dendronema Schmidle; Didymothrix Y.X.Wei & H.J.Hu; Fottea F.Hindák; Geminellopsis A.A.Korschikov; Gloeotilopsis Iyengar & Philipose; Gyoerffyella E.Kol; Heterothrichopsis Iyengar & Kanthamma; Hormidiopsis Heering; Hormidiospora Vinatzer; Ingenhouzella Gaillon; Microsporopsis Vischer; Pearsoniella Fritsch & Rich; Protomonostroma K.L.Vinogradova; Psephonema Skuja; Psephotaxus West & G.S.West; Pseudendocloniopsis Vischer; Pseudoschizomeris Deason & Bold; Pseudothrix Hanic & S.C.Lindstrom; Spongomorpha Kützing; Ulothrix Kützing; Ulotrichopsis L.Wichmann; Urospora Aresch.

= Ulotrichaceae =

Family of algae

Ulotrichaceae is a family of green algae in the order Ulotrichales. Members of the family are found in both marine and freshwater habitats.

Members of the family Ulotrichaceae consist of unbranched filaments. The cells are typically barrel-shaped or cylindrical, wider than long. The cell has a chloroplast which forms a girdle-shaped parietal band; each chloroplast may have several pyrenoids.

Asexual reproduction occurs via fragmentation of the filament, or the production of zoospores. Sexual reproduction is isogamous, and involves an alternation of generations between the larger, filamentous gametophyte and a Codiolum-stage sporophyte.
