= Kōchi University =

Public university in Kōchi, Japan

Coordinates: 33°35′41″N 133°36′47″E

Kochi University
- 高知大学
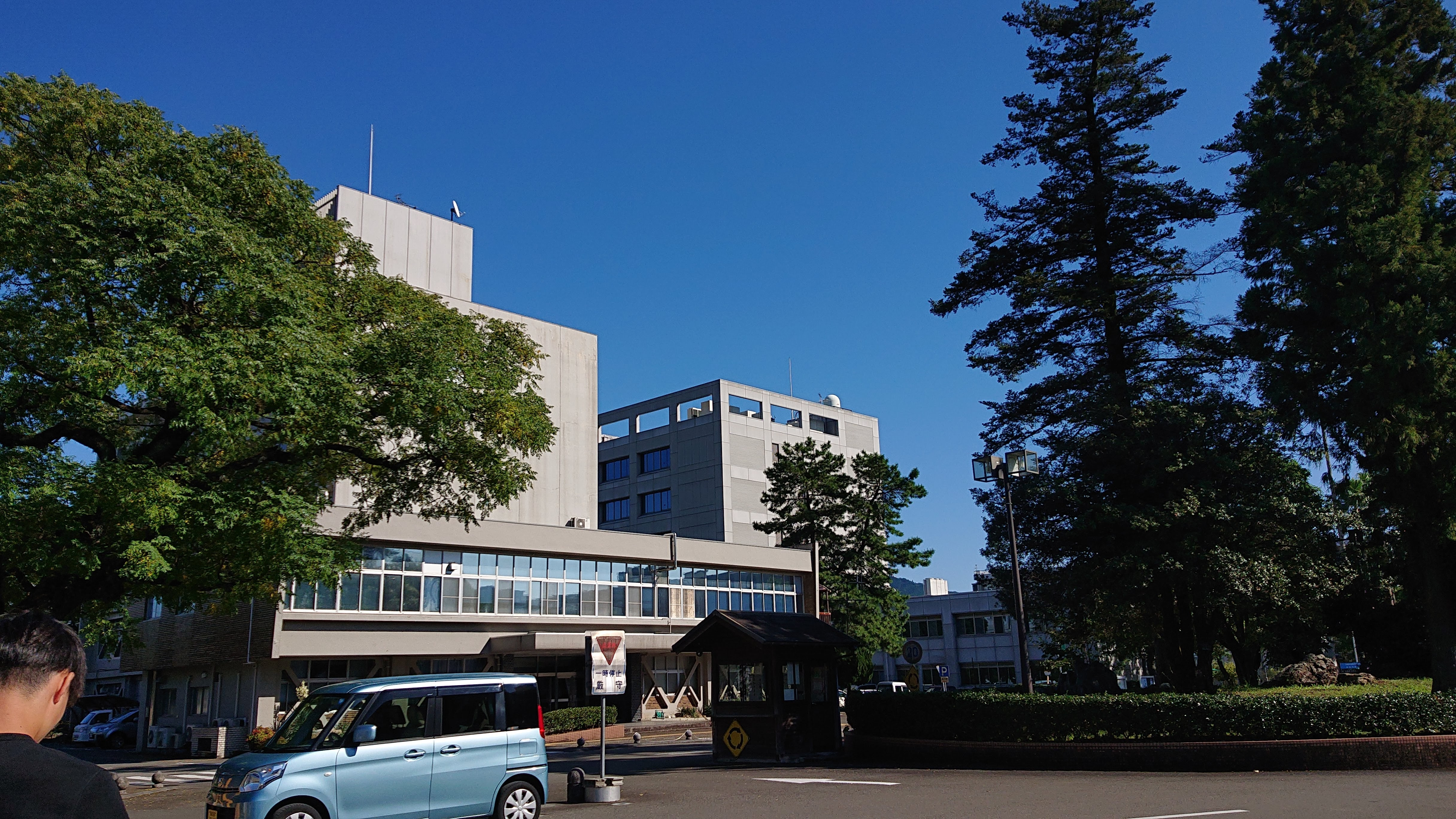
- Motto: "from Regionality to Globality and from Globality to Regionality"
- Type: Public (National)
- Established: Toya-gakusha founded 1874; Kochi University established 1949
- President: Katsutoshi Sakurai
- Location: Kōchi/Nankoku, Kōchi, Japan
- Website: www.kochi-u.ac.jp/english/

Kochi University (高知大学, Kōchi Daigaku) is one of the 86 national universities of Japan located in Kōchi, Kōchi Prefecture. The predecessors Toya-gakusha (later Kochi Normal School) was founded in 1874, Kochi Higher School in 1922, Kochi prefecture Teacher Training Institute for Agriculture Associated School in 1923, and it was chartered as a university in 1949.

== Faculties and affiliated units ==
- Faculty of Humanities and Social Sciences
  - Department of Humanities and Social Sciences
  - Graduate School of Integrated Arts and Sciences
- Faculty of Education
  - Kindergarten, Elementary School, Junior High School, Special Education School
  - Center for Educational Research and Teacher Development
  - Graduate School of Integrated Arts and Sciences
- Faculty of Science and Technology
  - Department of Mathematics and Physics
  - Department of Information Science
  - Department of Biological Sciences
  - Department of Chemistry and Biotechnology
  - Department of Global Environment and Disaster Prevention
  - Affiliated facilities
    - Kochi Earthquake Observatory
    - Research Laboratory of Hydrothermal Chemistry
  - Graduate School of Integrated Arts and Sciences
- Faculty of Medicine (Medical School)
  - Affiliated Facilities
    - Kochi Medical School Hospital
    - Center of Medical Information Science
    - Center for Innovative and Translational Medicine (CITM)
    - Center for Photodynamic Medicine
  - Graduate School of Integrated Arts and Sciences
- Faculty of Agriculture and Marine Science
  - Department of Agriculture, Forestry, Bioresource and Environmental Sciences
  - Department of Agricultural Chemistry
  - Department of Marine Resource Science
  - Affiliated Facility
    - Education and Research Center for Subtropical Field Science
  - Graduate School of Integrated Arts and Sciences
- Faculty of Regional Collaboration
- Faculty of Innovative Human Development (TOSA Innovative Human Development)

University rankings

Global – Overall
- THE World: 601-800 (2018)

Regional – Overall
- QS Asia: 271-280 (2020)
- THE Asia: 182 (2018)
- USNWR Asia: 558 (2023)

== Graduate School and General Programs ==
- Graduate School of Integrated Arts and Sciences
  - Master's Courses
    - Humanities and Social Sciences Program
    - Education Program
    - Science Program
    - Medical Science Program
    - Nursing Science Program
    - Agricultural Science Program
    - Kuroshio Integrated Science (Sub-Major)
    - Plant Health Care Science (Sub-Major)
  - Doctoral Courses
    - Applied Science Program
    - Medicine Program
    - Kuroshio Science Program
    - The United Graduate School of Agricultural Sciences, Ehime University

== University Facility ==
- Center for Higher Education Development
- Admission Center
- Center for General Student Support
- Center for Teacher Education Development
- Science Research Center
  - Oceanography Section
    - Division of Marine Biology Research
    - Division of Marine Environment and Resource Use
    - Division of Marine Biotechnology
  - Life Sciences and Functional Materials Section
    - Division of Biological Research
    - Division of Laboratory Animal Science
    - Division of Genome Science
    - Division of Functional Materials
  - Disaster Prevention Section (Center for Disaster Prevention, Support, & Research for Nankai Earthquake)
- Center for Regional Collaboration
- Center for International Collaboration
- Center for Disaster Prevention Promotion
- Library and Information Technology
- Health Service Center

== Nation-Wide Joint Use Facilities ==
- Center for Advanced Marine Core Research

== Campuses ==
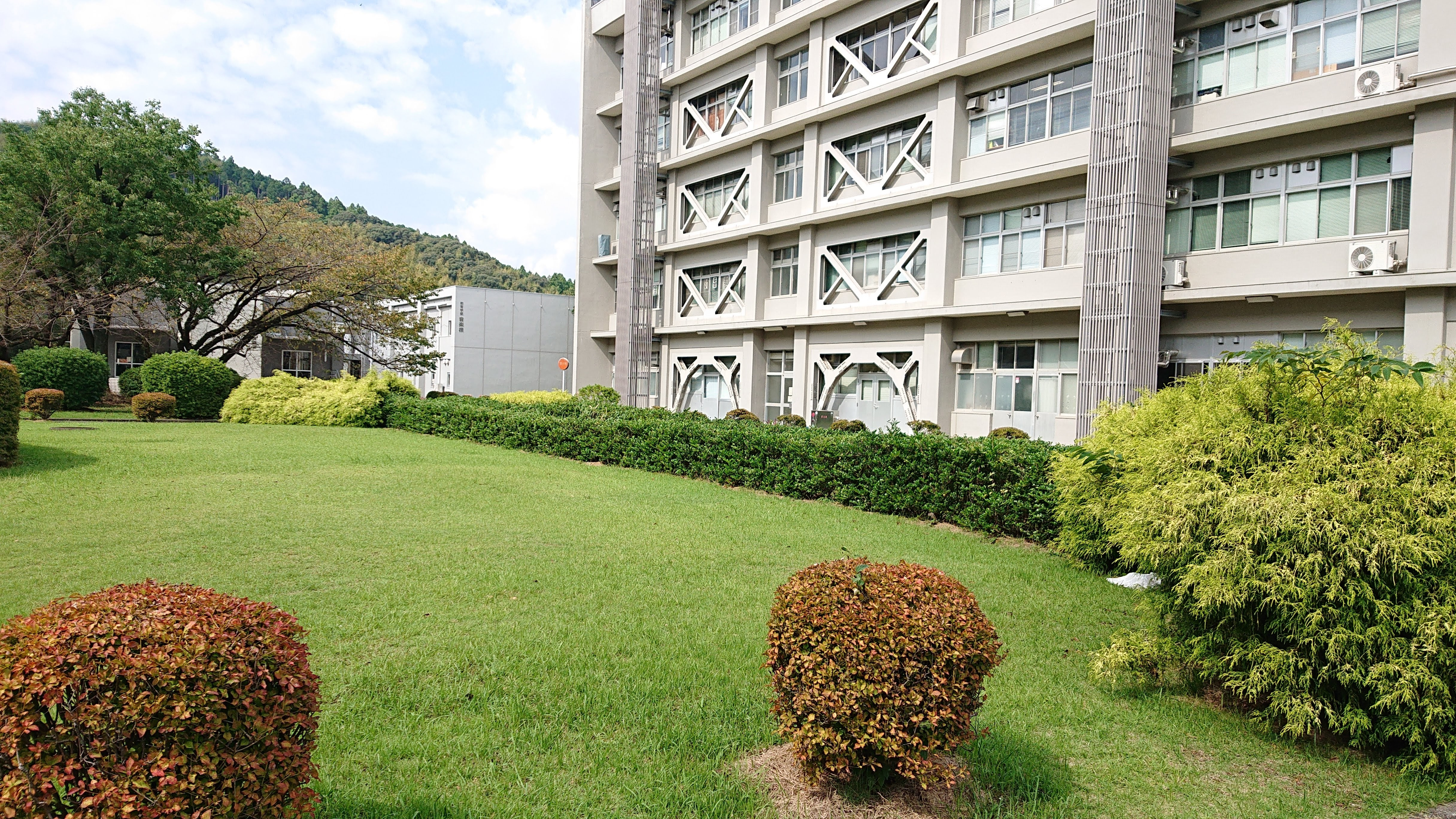
Faculty of Education at Asakura Campus

Kochi University has three campuses: 1.) the Asakura Campus which is the location of the Faculty of Humanities and Social Sciences, Faculty of Education, Faculty of Science and Technology, and Faculty of Regional Collaboration; 2.) Monobe Campus, the location of the Faculty of Agriculture and Marine Science; and 3.) Oko Campus where Medical School is located.

=== Asakura Campus ===
2-5-1 Akebono-cho, Kochi 780-8520, Japan

It contains the Faculty of Humanities and Social Sciences, Faculty of Education, Faculty of Science and Technology, and the Faculty of Regional Collaboration.

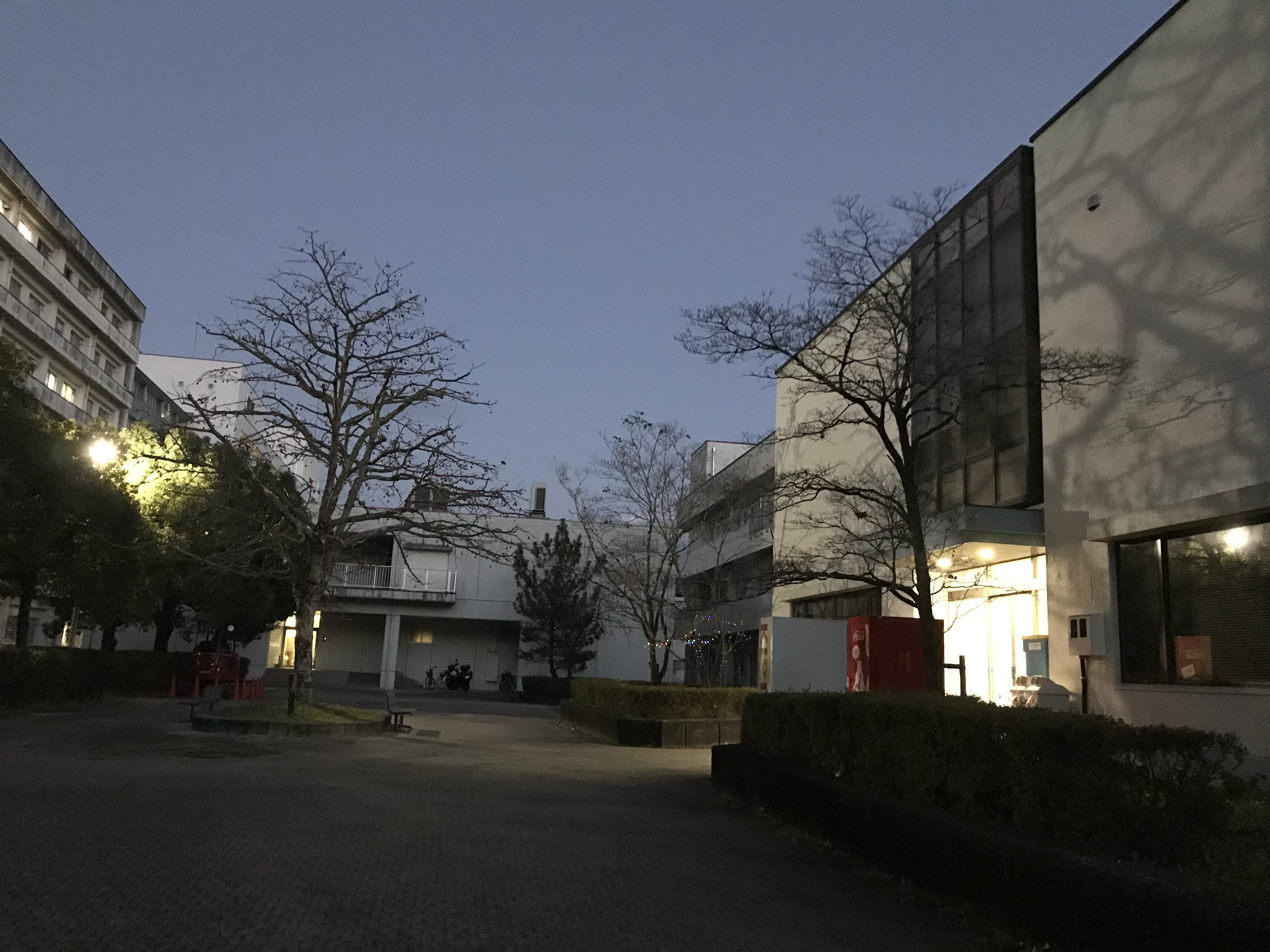
Oko Campus (Medical School)

=== Monobe Campus ===
200 Otsu, Monobe, Nankoku city, Kochi 783-8502, Japan

It contains the Faculty of Agriculture and Marine Science.

=== Oko Campus (Medical School) ===
185-1 Kohasu, Oko-cho, Nankoku-shi, Kochi 783-8505, Japan

It contains the Medical School and its affiliated facilities such as the Kochi Medical School Hospital.

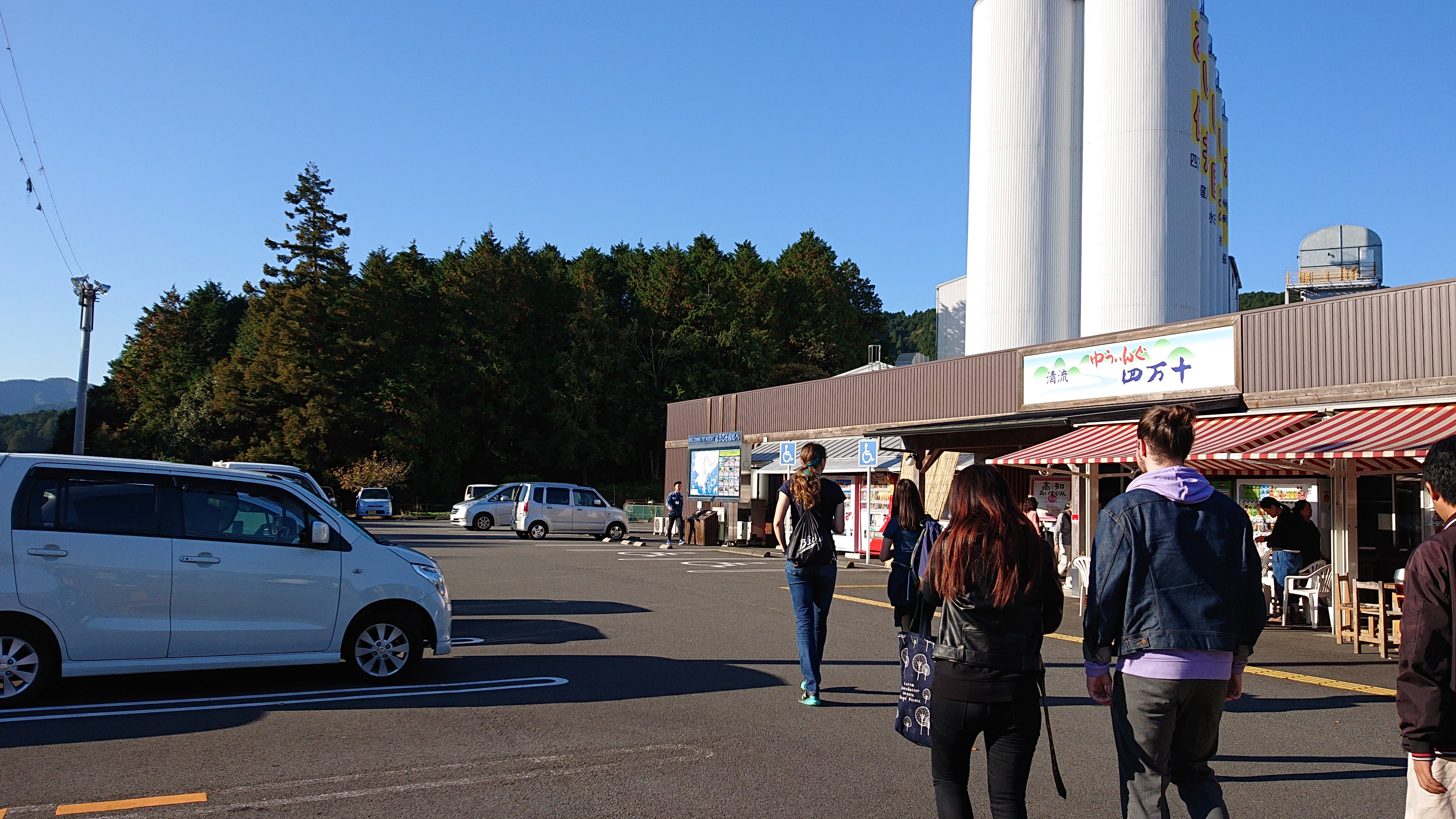
International students of Kochi University on an official tour. The tour is about familiarization or immersion with university facilities as well as Japanese culture (especially Kochi Prefecture).

== Global Education Support Center ==
- The Kochi University Global Education and Advancement Support Center aims to meet the goals of ‘the Grand Design 2030’ that the University has formalised, specifically those concerned with the globalisation of the region and the fostering of globally competent human resources who can actively participate in global society with a local perspective.
- Specifically, the center has three basic objectives:
  - globalisation of the campus through promotion of educational exchanges with universities overseas
  - facilitation of overseas study for any student who so desires, by improving study abroad educational programs and related support systems
  - promotion of incoming student exchange programs and enhancement of Japanese as a foreign language education

== Notable alumni ==
- Atsuko Betchaku, Japanese pacifist and educator
- Ebenezer Oduro Owusu, Ghanaian academician and educational leader
- Felix Bast, Indian marine biologist (phycologist)
- Hiroyuki Konishi, 20th century Japanese politician
- Kanako Otsuji, Japanese politician

=== Notable faculty ===
- Kazuo Ueda, Japanese Yiddishist
