= Aerosakkonemataceae =

Scientific classification
- Domain: Bacteria
- Kingdom: Bacillati
- Phylum: Cyanobacteriota
- Class: Cyanophyceae
- Order: Oscillatoriales
- Family: Aerosakkonemataceae; Strunecký and Mareš 2023

Genera
- Aerosakkonema Thu and Watanabe 2012; Cephalothrix Malone et al. 2015; Limnonema Song et al. 2023; Microseira McGregor and Sendall 2015; Potamosiphon McGregor and Sendall 2019

Family of bacteria

The Aerosakkonemataceae are a family of cyanobacteria.

The type genus of this family is Aerosakkonema.
