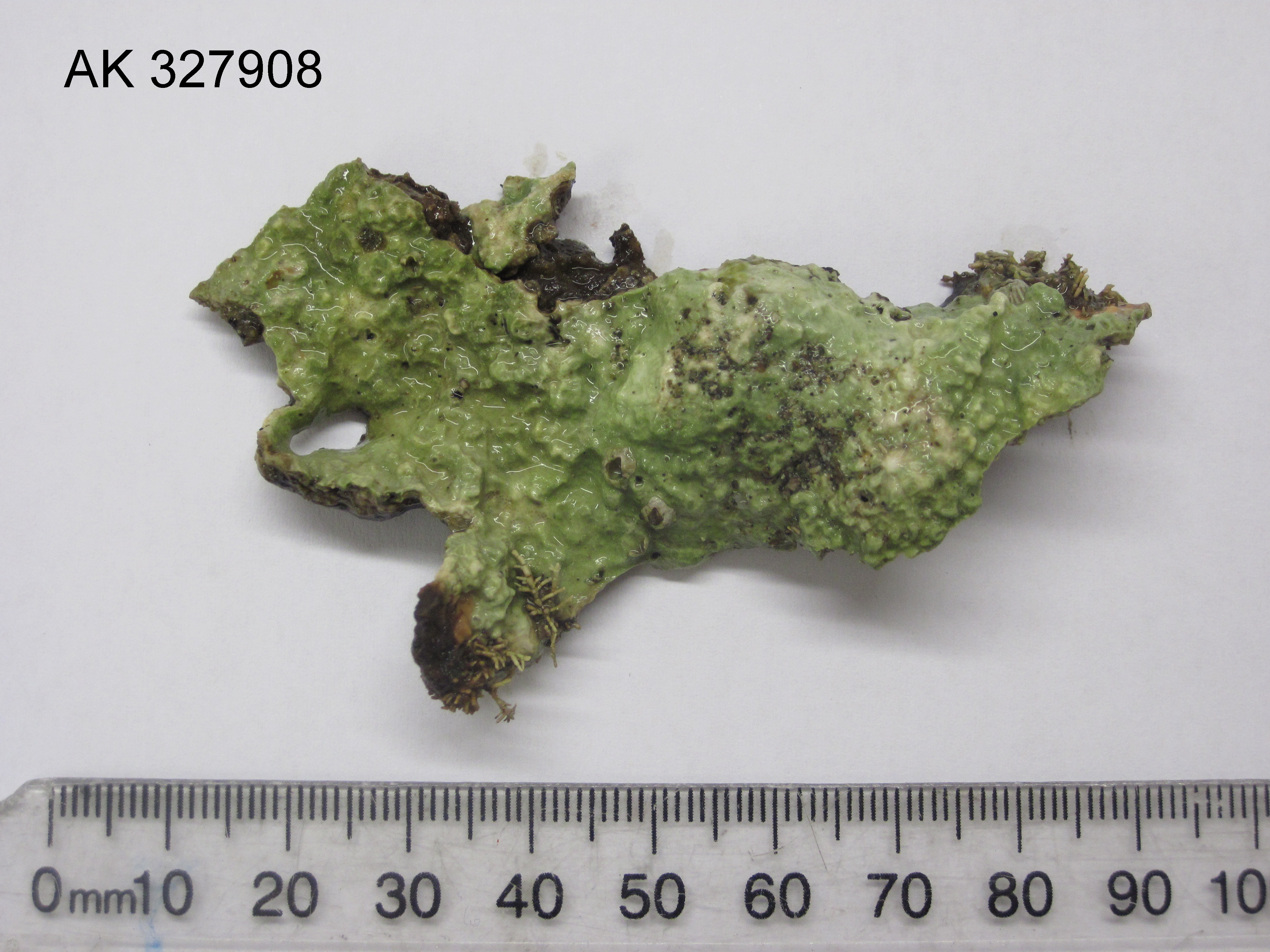
- Gomontia polyrhiza

Scientific classification
- Clade: Viridiplantae
- Division: Chlorophyta
- Class: Ulvophyceae
- Order: Ulotrichales
- Family: Gomontiaceae
- Genus: Gomontia; Bornet & Flahault, 1888

Type species
- Gomontia polyrhiza (Lagerheim) Bornet & Flahault

Species
- Gomontia aegagropila; Gomontia archiza; Gomontia arhiza; Gomontia arrhiza; Gomontia codiolifera; Gomontia lignicola; Gomontia polyrhiza; Gomontia rupicola

= Gomontia =

Genus of algae

Gomontia is a genus of green algae, in the family Gomontiaceae.

The genus name of Gomontia is in honour of Maurice-Augustin Gomont (1839 - 1909), who was a French phycologist.

The genus was circumscribed by Jean-Baptiste Édouard Bornet and Charles Henri Marie Flahault in J. Bot. (Morot) vol.2 on page 164 in 1888.
