= Gomontiellaceae =

Scientific classification
- Domain: Bacteria
- Phylum: Cyanobacteria
- Class: Cyanophyceae
- Order: Oscillatoriales
- Family: Gomontiellaceae; Elenkin

Genera
- Crinalium Crow 1927; Gomontiella Teoderesco 1901; Hormoscilla Anagnostidis et Komárek 1988; Katagnymene Lemmermann 1899; Komvophoron Anagnostidis et Komárek 1988; Starria Lang 1977

Family of bacteria

The Gomontiellaceae are a family of cyanobacteria.

The genus name of Gomontiella is in honour of Maurice-Augustin Gomont (1839 - 1909), who was a French phycologist.

The genus was circumscribed by Emanoil Constantin Teodoresco in Verh. K.K. Zool.-Bot. Ges. Wien vol.52 on page 760 in 1901.
