= Geminella minor =

Scientific classification
- Clade: Viridiplantae
- Division: Chlorophyta
- Class: Trebouxiophyceae
- Order: Chlorellales
- Family: Chlorellaceae
- Genus: Geminella
- Species: G. minor

Binomial name
- Geminella minor (Nägeli) Heering

Species of green alga

Geminella minor is a species of filamentous freshwater green alga in the family Chlorellaceae. The species probably has a cosmopolitan distribution. The type specimen came from Switzerland and the species has been reported in the British Isles and elsewhere in the northern hemisphere, including Japan, Ukraine and North America. It occurs in freshwater aquatic habitats.

Geminella consists of chains of cells (termed filaments) in a contiguous row. The cells are cylindrical 2-10 μm wide and 2–4 times longer than wide. The cells are embedded in a mucilaginous sheath that is about 8–18 μm wide. The chloroplast fills part of the cell and has pyrenoids.
