= Frank Shipley Collins =

American botanist (1848–1920)

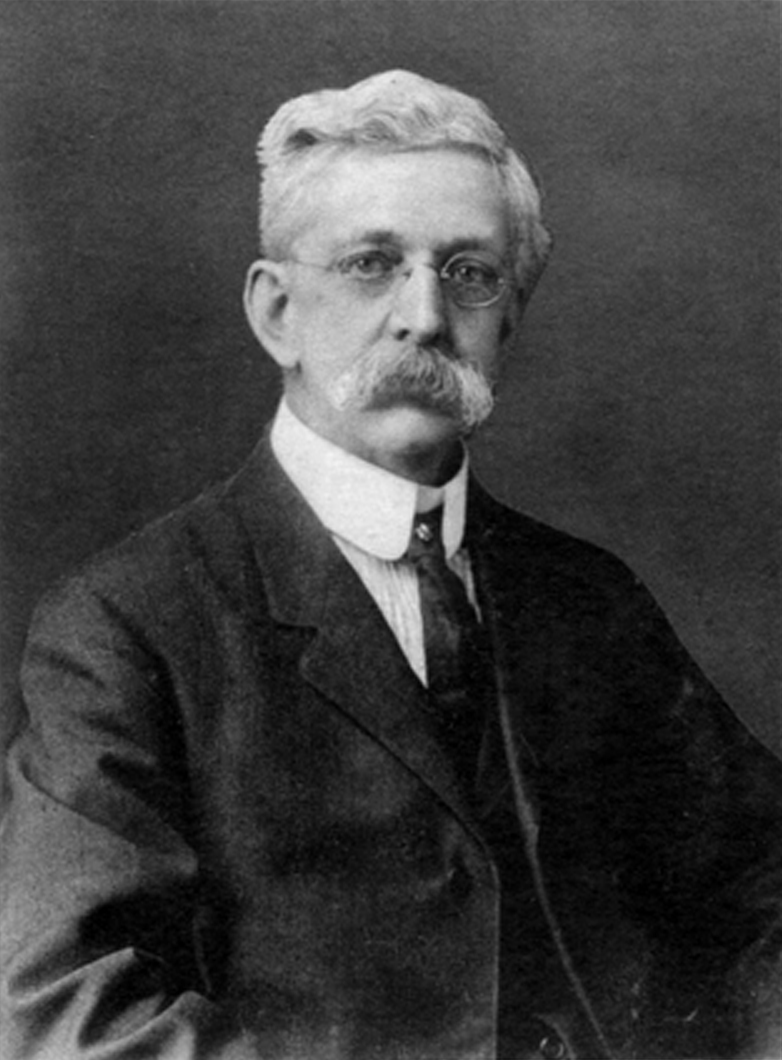

Frank Shipley Collins (February 6, 1848 –1920) was an American botanist and algologist specializing in the study of marine algae.

Frank Shipley Collins was born on February 6, 1848, in Charleston, Massachusetts.

He was a pioneer in the study of the distribution of algae on the Atlantic seaboard and Bermudas and was the leading American algologist of his time. He wrote The Green Algae of North America and Working Key to the Genera of North American Algae. Several species bear his name in his honor, including Collinsiella tuberculata (green algae in the order Ulotrichales), and Phaeosaccion collinsii.

One of his major undertakings was the co-editing of the exsiccata series, that became collectively known by the title of the first volume, the Phycotheca Boreali-Americana. Starting with 1895 until 1919, Collins teamed up with botanists William Albert Setchell and Isaac Holden to create this kind of published specimen collections of dried North American freshwater and marine algae.

He was a founding member of the New England Botanical Club.

Collins died on May 25, 1920, in New Haven, Connecticut.
