= Philipose =

Philipose (ഫിലിപ്പോസ്) is a surname. Notable people with the surname include:

- John Philipose, Indian New Testament scholar
- Pamela Philipose, Indian journalist and researcher
- Thomas Philipose (1942–2018), Indian soldier
