= Alpha-agarase =

Identifiers
- EC no.: 3.2.1.158
- CAS no.: 63952-00-1

Databases
- IntEnz: IntEnz view
- BRENDA: BRENDA entry
- ExPASy: NiceZyme view
- KEGG: KEGG entry
- MetaCyc: metabolic pathway
- PRIAM: profile
- PDB structures: RCSB PDB PDBe PDBsum
Search
- PMC: articles
- PubMed: articles
- NCBI: proteins

Alpha-agarase (EC 3.2.1.158, agarase, agaraseA33) is an enzyme with systematic name agarose 3-glycanohydrolase. This enzyme catalyses the following chemical reaction

Endohydrolysis of (1->3)-alpha-L-galactosidic linkages in agarose, yielding agarotetraose as the major product

This enzyme requires Ca^{2+}.
