= Monostromataceae =

Scientific classification
- Kingdom: Plantae
- Division: Chlorophyta
- Class: Ulvophyceae
- Order: Ulotrichales
- Family: Monostromataceae; Kunieda

Genera
- Monostroma

Family of algae

Monostromataceae is a family of green algae in the order Ulotrichales.
