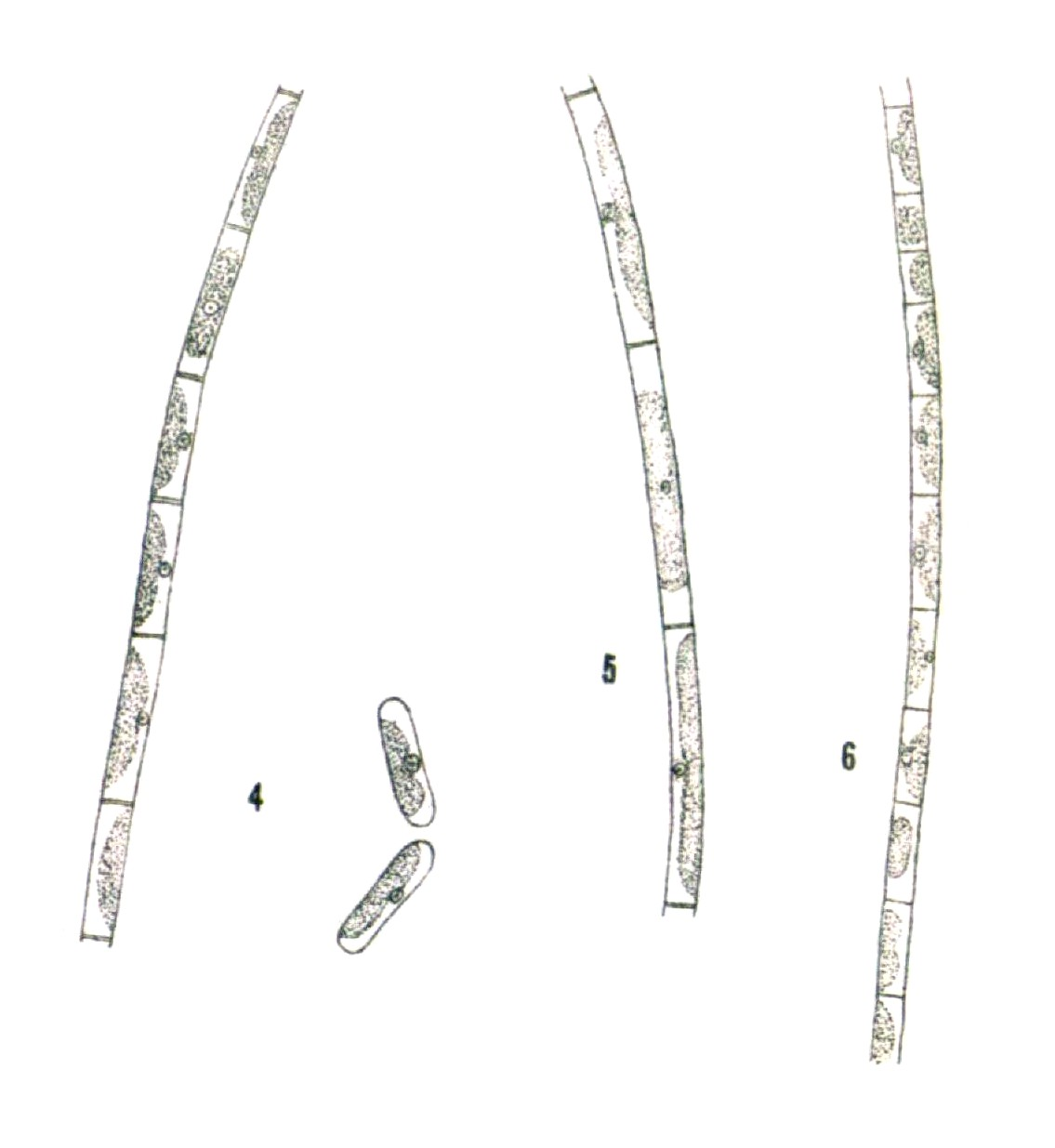
- Gloeotila scopulina

Scientific classification
- Kingdom: Plantae
- Division: Chlorophyta
- Class: Trebouxiophyceae
- Order: Chlorellales
- Family: Chlorellaceae
- Genus: Gloeotila; Kützing

Type species
- Gloeotila oscillarina Kützing

Species
- Gloeotila sp. JL11-10; Gloeotila contorta

= Gloeotila =

Genus of algae

Gloeotila is a genus of green algae in the class Trebouxiophyceae. It is typically found in freshwater habitats, either attached to surfaces or planktonic, or found in soil.

== Description ==
Gloeotila consists of unbranched, uniseriate filaments of cells which are generally surrounded by a sheath of mucilage. The cells are connected to each other loosely and thus the filaments often loosely break apart. The cells are cylindrical in shape, longer than wide, and are connected end-to-end, Cells are uninucleate (with one nucleus). Cells have one parietal chloroplast filling the length of the cell; pyrenoids are absent. Reproduction occurs by the formation of biflagellate zoospores.

== Taxonomy ==
The taxonomy of Gloeotila is currently problematic. The type species, Gloeotila oscillarina, was described by Friedrich Traugott Kützing in 1843, but its original description was very poor, making it difficult to identify. A lectotype was provided by T. E. Hazen in 1902, and the current generic concept was defined by W. Heering in 1914, but some authors regard G. oscillarina as a synonym of Stigeoclonium setigerum. As currently defined, Gloeotila contains numerous species, many of which show various affinities to other genera such as Geminella, Stichococcus, and Klebsormidium. Therefore, some authors prefer to place species of Gloeotila in those genera instead.
