= Borzia (cyanobacteria) =

Scientific classification
- Domain: Bacteria
- Phylum: Cyanobacteria
- Class: Cyanophyceae
- Order: Oscillatoriales
- Family: Borziaceae; Borzì
- Genus: Borzia; Cohn ex Gomont 1892

Genus of bacteria

Borzia is a genus of cyanobacteria.

The genus name of Borzia is in honour of Antonino Borzì (1852–1921), was an Italian botanist. It was published in Jahres-Ber. Schles. Ges. Vaterl. Kult. Vol.60 on page 227 in 1883.
