= Inspired Teacher =

- Civilian award for top performing faculties at the Central Universities
- Sponsored by: Government of India
- First award: 2015
- Final award: 2016

Highlights
- Total awarded: 44

Inspired Teacher (alternatively termed President's Inspired Teacher) is the highest civilian recognition for University-level teachers in the Republic of India in the form of an in-residence program with the President of India at Rashtrapati Bhavan, New Delhi. This recognition is not related to the National Award for teachers, which is the highest recognition for school teachers. The Inspired Teacher honour is instituted by the President of India in 2015 to recognize top performing faculties at the Central Universities and to give a platform to have their voice heard among the top bureaucrats to solicit suggestions from teachers on educational policy matters. Nomination of one faculty member by the respective Central Universities in India for participation to the In-residence Program at the Rashtrapati Bhavan consists of student feedback, teaching quality, and research output analyses. The recognized Inspired Teachers are invited for a one-week-long In-Residence programme with the President of India at the Rashtrapati Bhavan, New Delhi.

== History ==
Pranab Mukherjee, the former President of India, instituted Inspired Teacher recognition in 2015. The in-residence programme for inspired teachers was announced by the President at the annual conference of vice-chancellors of central universities on February 5, 2015. The President of India had defined an Inspired Teacher as an academic who is a value-oriented, mission-driven, self-motivated and result-oriented individual who works towards impacting the environment in a positive manner through his own actions as well as by imparting knowledge amongst students to help them achieve their potential. An Inspired Teacher links the individual goals of the students to the societal and national goals. The President, in his address during an interaction with the Inspired Teachers, quoted a statement from the Greek novelist Nikos Kazantzakis, which he believed outlined his vision of a true teacher. Nikos Kazantzkis had said: “True teachers are those who use themselves as bridges over which they invite their students to cross; then, having facilitated their crossing, joyfully collapse, encouraging them to create their own”.

The President instituted Inspired Teacher recognition as a means to give dignity and recognition to quality teachers. It was essential that such Inspired Teachers be recognized so that they have motivation and drive. The Inspired Teachers were invited for one week ‘In Residence’ programme at Rashtrapati Bhavan as part of this endeavour.

One of the Presidential gifts as part of the 2015 Inspired Teacher recognition

31 teachers were recognized with the "President's Inspired Teacher" award for 2015.

13 teachers were recognized with the "President's Inspired Teacher" award for 2016.
