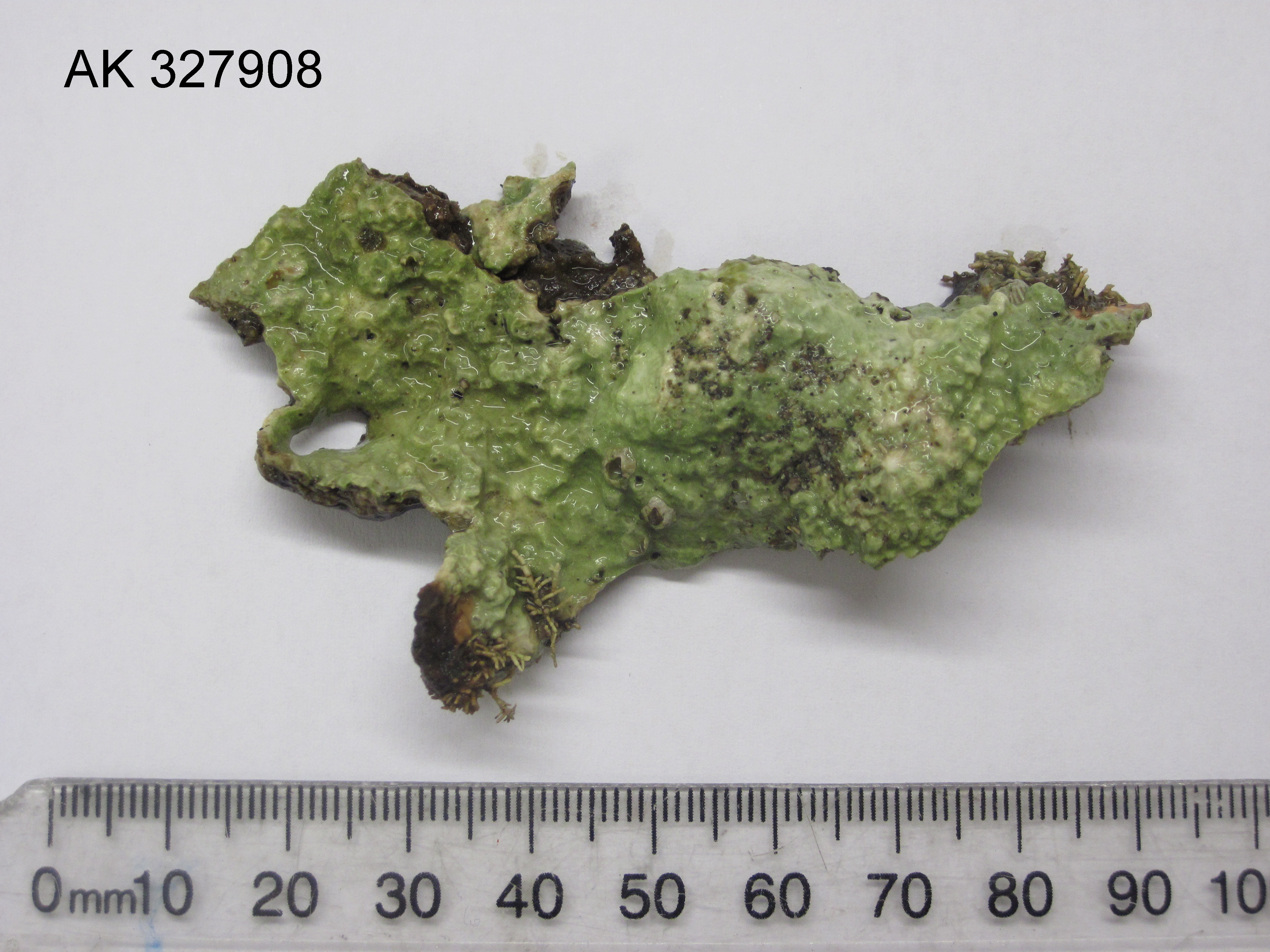
- Gomontia polyrhiza

Scientific classification
- Kingdom: Plantae
- Division: Chlorophyta
- Class: Ulvophyceae
- Order: Ulotrichales
- Family: Gomontiaceae; De Toni

Genera
- †Cavernula Radtke; Chlorojackia R.Nielsen & J.A.Correa; Collinsiella Setchell & Gardner; Eugomontia Kornmann; Gomontia Bornet & Flahault

= Gomontiaceae =

Family of algae

Gomontiaceae is a family of green algae in the order Ulotrichales.
