= Β-Agarase =

Class of enzymes

β-Agarase

Identifiers
- EC no.: 3.2.1.81
- CAS no.: 37288-57-6

Databases
- IntEnz: IntEnz view
- BRENDA: BRENDA entry
- ExPASy: NiceZyme view
- KEGG: KEGG entry
- MetaCyc: metabolic pathway
- PRIAM: profile
- PDB structures: RCSB PDB PDBe PDBsum
Search
- PMC: articles
- PubMed: articles
- NCBI: proteins

Agarase (EC 3.2.1.81, AgaA, AgaB, endo-β-agarase, agarose 3-glycanohydrolase) is an enzyme with systematic name agarose 4-glycanohydrolase. It is found in agarolytic bacteria and is the first enzyme in the agar catabolic pathway. It is responsible for allowing them to use agar as their primary source of carbon and enables their ability to thrive in the ocean.

Agarases are classified as either α-agarases or β-agarases based upon whether they degrade α or β linkages in agarose, breaking them into oligosaccharides. When secreted, α-agarases yield oligosaccharides with 3.6 anhydro-L-galactose at the reducing end whereas β-agarases result in D-galactose residues.

== Function in Environment ==
As could be expected, many species of agar-degraders are marine micro-organisms – an adaptation to their environment which would be wasted in the majority of micro-organisms existing on land (although there are such examples, including a species of Paenibacillus in the Rhizosphere of Spinach). From species within genus Vibrio to Alteromonas, the presence of agarase allows agar-degrading bacteria an abundant food source in the ocean. Research also demonstrates that glucose can inhibit extracellular agarase secretion (but not transcription), causing it to degrade within the cell and thus limit growth of the bacteria. In addition, a study of the effects of phosphate limitation on agarase shows that limiting phosphate increases both intracellular agarase production and extracellular secretion, whereas a magnesium limitation does not. This further highlights the niche which this class of bacteria usually occupies, as the concentration of glucose or phosphate in the ocean is very low while magnesium concentration is generally much higher, suiting the agar-degrading bacteria’s agarase production; there is simply no need to use glucose in the ocean, so many organisms don't.

While the optimal pH of agarase is 5.5, it is stable at a tolerant range, from 4.0 to 9.0.

== See also ==
- Bacteria
- Agar
- Alpha-agarase
