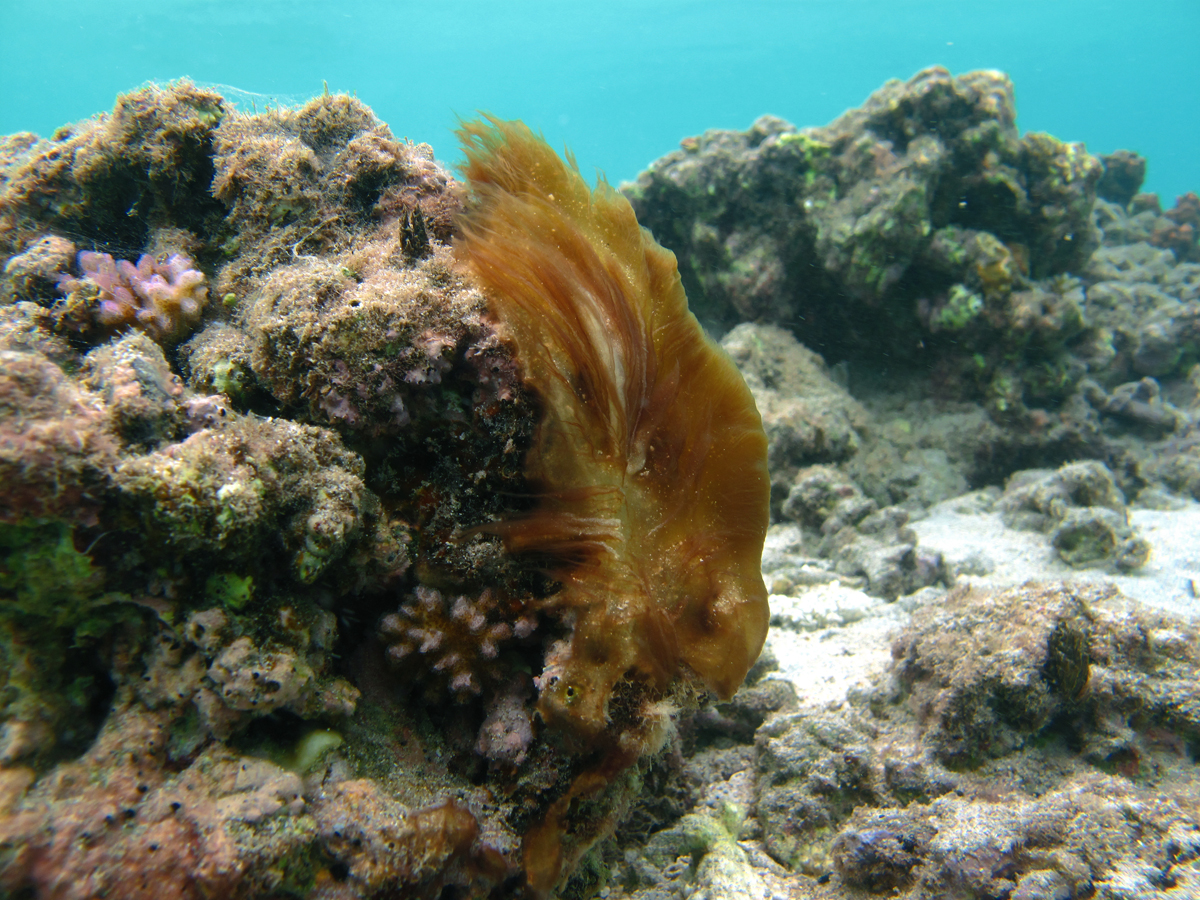
- Phormidium cf. laysanense

Scientific classification
- Domain: Bacteria
- Kingdom: Bacillati
- Phylum: Cyanobacteriota
- Class: Cyanophyceae
- Order: Oscillatoriales; Schaffner

Families
- Aerosakkonemataceae Strunecký and Mareš 2023; Borziaceae Borzì; Coleofasciculaceae Komárek et al. 2014; Cyanothecaceae Komárek et al. 2014; Girvanellaceae Luchinina 1975; Gomontiellaceae Elenkin; Homoeotrichaceae Elenkin; Microcoleaceae Komárek et al. 2014; Oscillatoriaceae (S. F. Gray) Harvey ex Kirchner

= Oscillatoriales =

Order of bacteria

The Oscillatoriales are an order of cyanobacteria.
