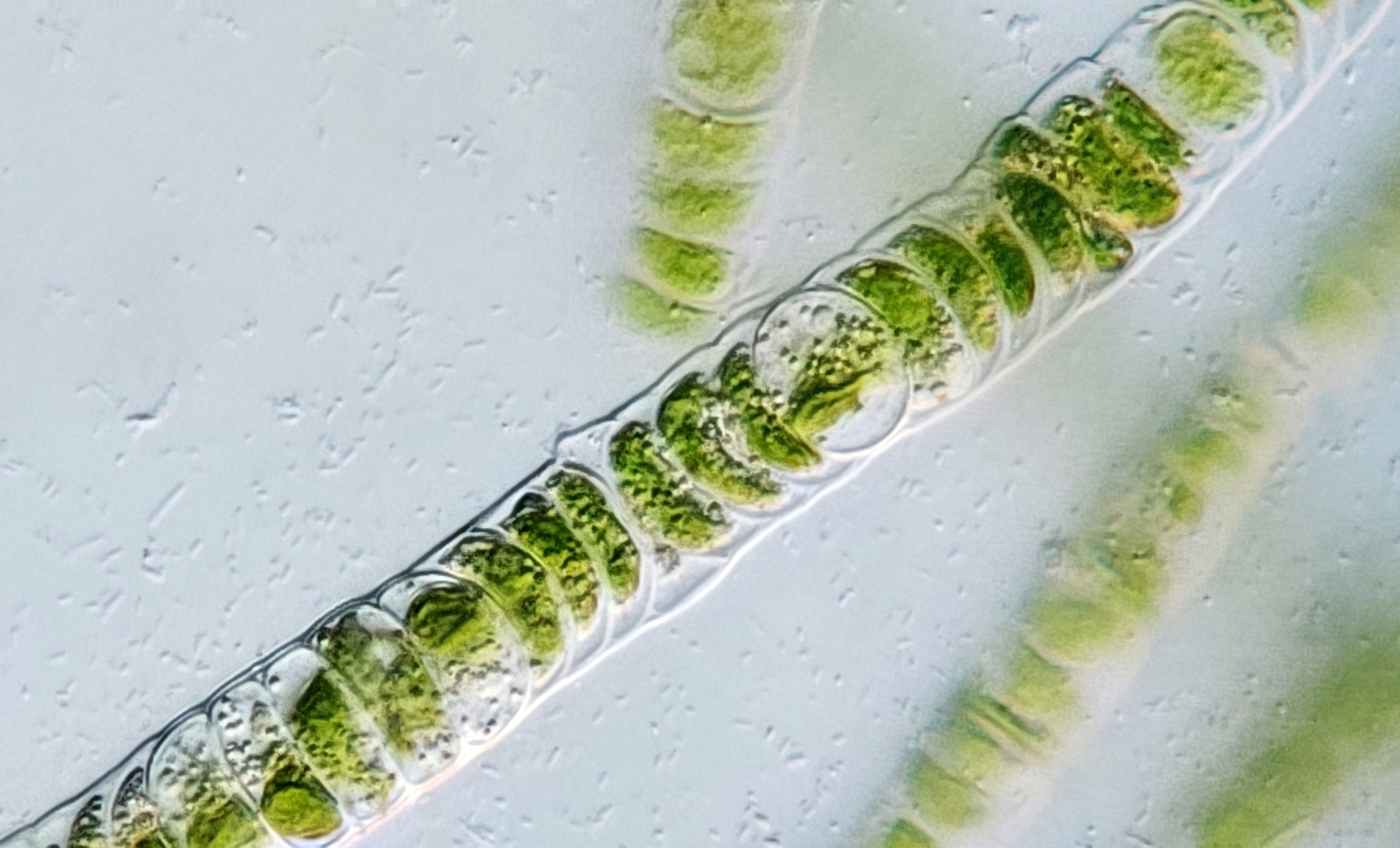
- Ulothrix zonata

Scientific classification
- Kingdom: Plantae
- Division: Chlorophyta
- Class: Ulvophyceae
- Order: Ulotrichales; Borzì

Families
- See text

Synonyms
- Acrosiphoniales

= Ulotrichales =

Order of algae

Ulotrichales is an order of green algae in the class Ulvophyceae. Members of this order are most common in freshwater and marine habitats, although some are terrestrial or aerophytic.

Algae in the Ulotrichales are diverse in morphology, and include coccoid (round single cells), sarcinoid (three-dimensional packet-like), filamentous (thread-like), and blade-like forms. The cells generally contain a single parietal chloroplast with one to several pyrenoids, and one or several nuclei.

Some algae in the Ulotrichales are diplohaplontic; in these algae the gametophyte stage is dominant and the sporophyte consists of a single club-shaped to spherical, attached zygote. This zygote is known as the Codiolum stage. In other Ulotrichales, sexual reproduction is unknown.

== Families ==
- †Anatoliporaceae
- Binucleariaceae
- Collinsiellaceae
- Gayraliaceae
- Gloeotilaceae
- Gomontiaceae
- Hazeniaceae
- Helicodictyaceae
- Kraftionemaceae
- Monostromataceae
- Planophilaceae
- Sarcinofilaceae
- Tupiellaceae
- Ulotrichaceae
- †Vermiporellaceae

Genera unplaced to family (incertae sedis):

- Caulinema
- Trichosarcina
