= May 1926 =

Month of 1926

<<	May 1926					>>
Su	Mo	Tu	We	Th	Fr	Sa
						1
2	3	4	5	6	7	8
9	10	11	12	13	14	15
16	17	18	19	20	21	22
23	24	25	26	27	28	29
30	31

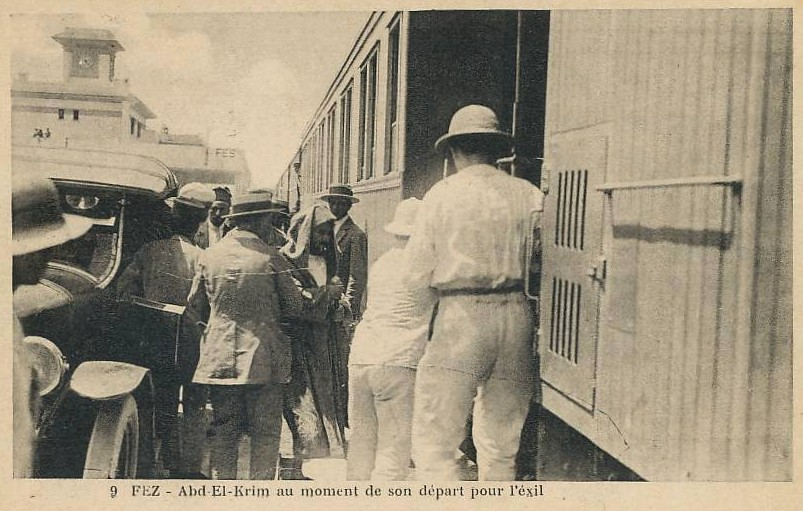
May 26, 1926: Rif Republic leader Abd el-Krim surrenders to French Army

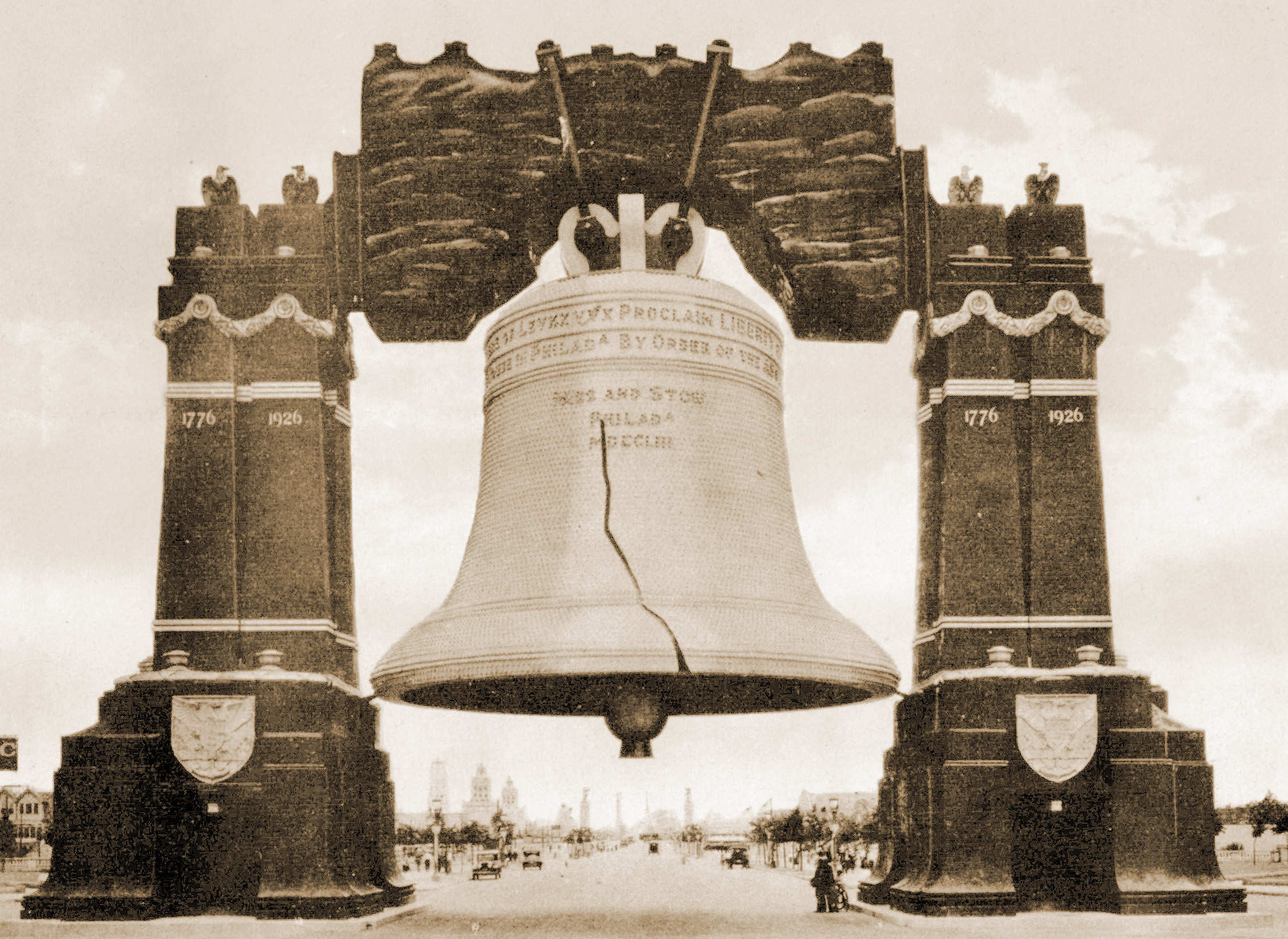
May 31, 1926: U.S. Sesquicentennial Exhibition opens in Philadelphia

The following events occurred in May 1926:

== May 1, 1926 (Saturday) ==
- The lockout of 800,000 British coal miners began, three days before the nationwide Trades Union Congress strike was to begin.
- The Ford Motor Company became the first major American company to introduce the 40-hour workweek and the two-day weekend, giving its workers Saturday off after having reduced the work day to 8 hours for six days a week. The reduction from 48-hours to 40 hours came with no reduction in pay.
- In Poland, five people were killed and 28 injured in fighting between socialists and communists during May Day events in Warsaw.
- Swinton Lions (who had finished third in England's Northern Rugby Football League with a record of 26 wins and 2 draws) defeated seventh-place Oldham, 9 to 3, to win the Challenge Cup at the Athletic Grounds, Rochdale, before 27,000 spectators.
- Born:
  - Peter Lax, Hungarian-born U.S. mathematician and Abel Prize laureate, known for the Lax conjecture; in Budapest (d. 2025)
  - Kenneth W. Ford, American physicist who served as CEO and Executive Director of the American Institute of Physics; in West Palm Beach, Florida (d. 2025)
  - Héctor Villa Osorio, Colombian businessman who founded the pharmaceutical conglomerate Dromayor; in Manizales (d. 2012)
  - Lev Razumovsky, Soviet Russian sculptor; in Leningrad (now Saint Petersburg) (d. 2006)
  - Marion Wells, American fundraiser and conservative activist; in Brooklyn, New York City (d. 2016)

== May 2, 1926 (Sunday) ==
- The Leopard of Rudraprayag, a man-eating leopard that had killed more than 125 people in British India's United Provinces, was shot by famous big game hunter Jim Corbett, who had tracked the big cat for 10 weeks.
- Civil war broke out in Nicaragua when a group of exiled members of the Partido Liberal, led by José María Moncada, landed at Bluefields. Moncada's objective was to topple the government of President Emiliano Chamorro Vargas of the Partido Conservador, who had overthrown an elected coalition government in March.

== May 3, 1926 (Monday) ==
- At one minute to midnight, the call by Britain's Trades Union Congress for its members to walk out on strike took effect. An estimated 1.7 million people would join the strike in support of the locked out miners.
- In British India, Miangul Abdul Wadud was recognized by the colonial government as the ruler of the princely state of Swat, and the successor to the late Syed Abdul Jabbar Shah. Wadud would rule until 1949, shortly after the princely state was integrated into Pakistan upon the division of British India.
- Born: Milton Santos, Brazilian geographer and laureate of the 1994 Vautin Lud International Geography Prize; in Brotas de Macaúbas, Bahia state (d. 2001)
- Died: Victor, Prince Napoléon, 63, Bonapartist pretender to the throne of France as a descendant of Napoleon Bonaparte, recognized by Bonapartists as the head of the House of Bonaparte since 1879 as "Napoleon V". His successor at the House of Bonaparte, was Victor's 12-year-old son, Louis, Prince Napoleon, who would continue as the pretender until his own death in 1997.

== May 4, 1926 (Tuesday) ==
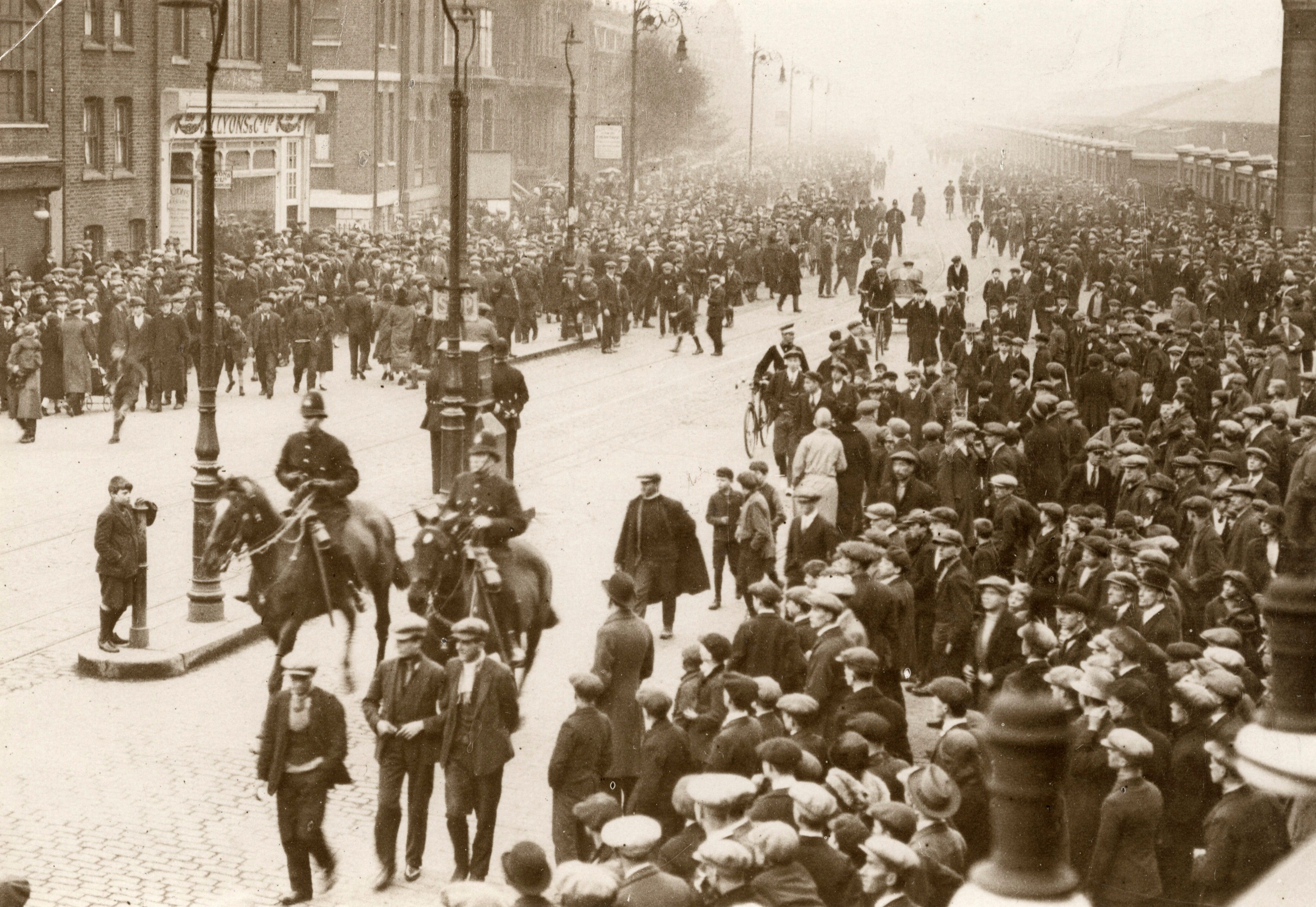
Thousands of shipyard workers walked out on strike in London.

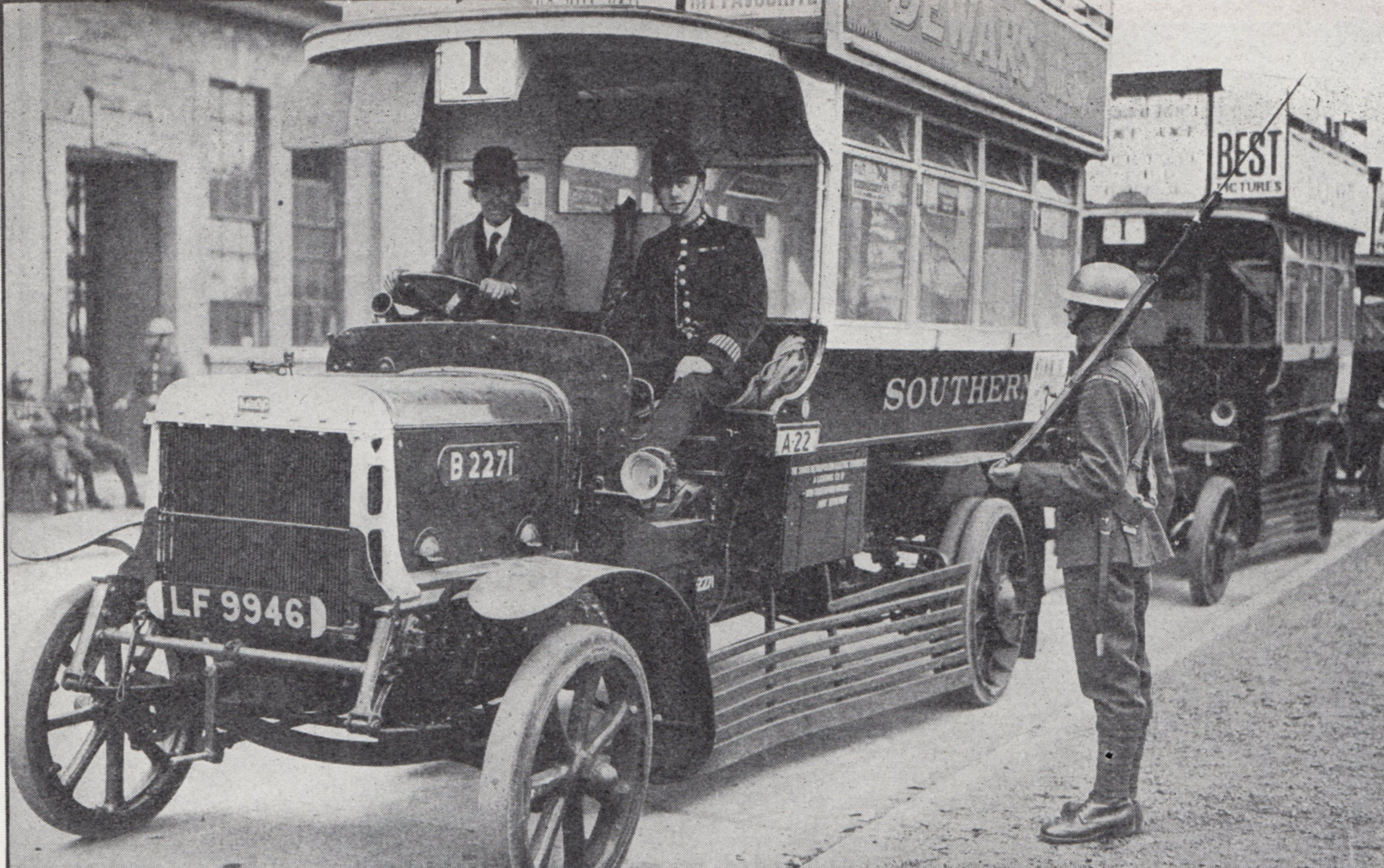
Volunteers took over jobs left vacant by the strike, including bus driving.

- Britain came to a standstill on the first full day of the general strike, with at least 1,500,000 employees of the railway industry and other public transport not showing up for work. The underground subway lines, rail stations, streetcars, and buses were closed, and most commuters walked to work. Throughout Britain, passenger and freight railway transport were suspended for the duration of the strike. Members of 205 labor and trade unions honored the strike call, including the 750,000 of the Miners' Federation, more than 327,000 of the National Union of Railway Workers, almost 335,000 of the United Textile Workers Association.
- The Ballets Russes staged a production of Romeo and Juliet at the Opéra de Monte-Carlo, with sets and costumes designed by Surrealist artists Max Ernst and Joan Miró.
- The Stinson Aircraft Corporation was incorporated in the U.S. by Eddie Stinson for the manufacture of single-engine airplanes, the most popular of which were the Stinson 108 and the Stinson V-76 Sentinel.
- Born:
  - Milt Thompson, NASA test pilot and U.S. Navy officer who was the first person to fly the NASA M2-F1, the first "lifting body" wingless aircraft, and one of only 12 pilots to fly the North American X-15 hypersonic rocket-powered aircraft; in Crookston, Minnesota (d. 1993).
  - Peter G. Ossorio, American psychologist known for developing the concept of descriptive psychology; in Los Angeles (d. 2007)
  - June Middleton, Australian polio survivor who spent more than 60 years in an iron lung, contracting polio at age 22 and remaining in need of the machine for the rest of her life; in Melbourne (d. 2009)

== May 5, 1926 (Wednesday) ==
- Two new newspapers, the British Worker (supporting the general strike) and the British Gazette (condemning it) appeared in Britain to fill the void left by the other dailies that only published in very limited form during the strike.
- The government of Poland's Prime Minister Aleksander Skrzyński resigned after slightly less than two years in office.
- The Norge airship left Gatchina near Leningrad, bound for Vadsø in preparation to cross the North Pole.
- Born:
  - Ann B. Davis, American TV actress and comedian, winner of two Emmy Awards for The Bob Cummings Show, but remembered best for portraying the housekeeper "Alice" on The Brady Bunch; in Schenectady, New York (d. 2014)
  - Maurice Green, American virologist and founder of the Institute of Molecular Virology at the St. Louis University School of Medicine; in New York City (d. 2017)
  - Neil "Bing" Russell, American film and TV actor; in Brattleboro, Vermont (d. 2003)
- Died:
  - Franz von Soxhlet, 76, German chemist and inventor known for patenting the Soxhlet extractor for extracting lipids from solid material
  - Fyodor Funtikov, 50, Azerbaijan anti-Communist known for ordering the 1918 execution of the "26 Baku Commissars", was executed in Baku after having returned to the Russian SFSR.
  - Charles S.L. Baker, 66, American inventor known for creating the friction heater (b. 1859)

== May 6, 1926 (Thursday) ==
- The first night landing of an airplane on the deck of a ship was accomplished in Britain when Royal Air Force pilot G. H. Boyce landed a Blackburn Dart on the deck of the aircraft carrier HMS Furious.
- Germany's Reichstag voted on the Fürstenenteignung the proposal to seize the dynastic properties of the former ruling houses of the German Empire. The expropriation of properties was scheduled to be voted upon in a public referendum on June 29, and passage of the bill would have made the referendum moot. With bourgeois political parties in the majority, the Reichstag vote failed, with 142 for and 236 against.
- Meeting in Lisbon, the International Olympic Committee awarded the right to host the 1928 Winter Olympics to St. Moritz in Switzerland, where all three bidders (St. Moritz, Davois and Engelberg) were located.
- Limited services returned around Britain as volunteers and strike-breaking workers stepped in, notably to help distribute food and provide other necessities.
- Born: Edward Clark, American painter, in Storyville, New Orleans (d. 2019)
- Died: S. I. Smith, 83, American zoologist who identified and classified numerous species of crustaceans (primarily crabs and lobsters), including Cardisoma crassum (the "mouthless crab"), and Uca pugnax (the "Atlantic marsh fiddler crab")

== May 7, 1926 (Friday) ==
- Nicaragua was invaded by a U.S. Navy force of 213 officers and men, brought by the cruiser USS Cleveland at Bluefields, to protect U.S. citizens during the recent renewal of the Nicaraguan Civil War.
- With peace talks having failed, French warplanes bombed Rif Republic positions in Morocco as the Rif War resumed.
- On the sixth day of the United Kingdom general strike, Liberal Party MP Herbert Samuel, authorized to negotiate on behalf of the British government, met with Trades Union Congress (TUC) leader Walter Citrine and Miners' Federation of Great Britain (MFGB) leader A. J. Cook to tentatively agree to a set of proposals to end the work shutdown. While the TUC members approved the plan, the Miners Federation rejected it.
- In the Soviet Union, Léon Theremin demonstrated his experimental television system which electrically transmitted and then projected near-simultaneous moving images on a five-foot square screen as part of his thesis.
- Born: Jacqueline Moreau, French ballerina and principal dancer for the Paris Opera Ballet; in Bandol, Var département (d. 2018)

== May 8, 1926 (Saturday) ==
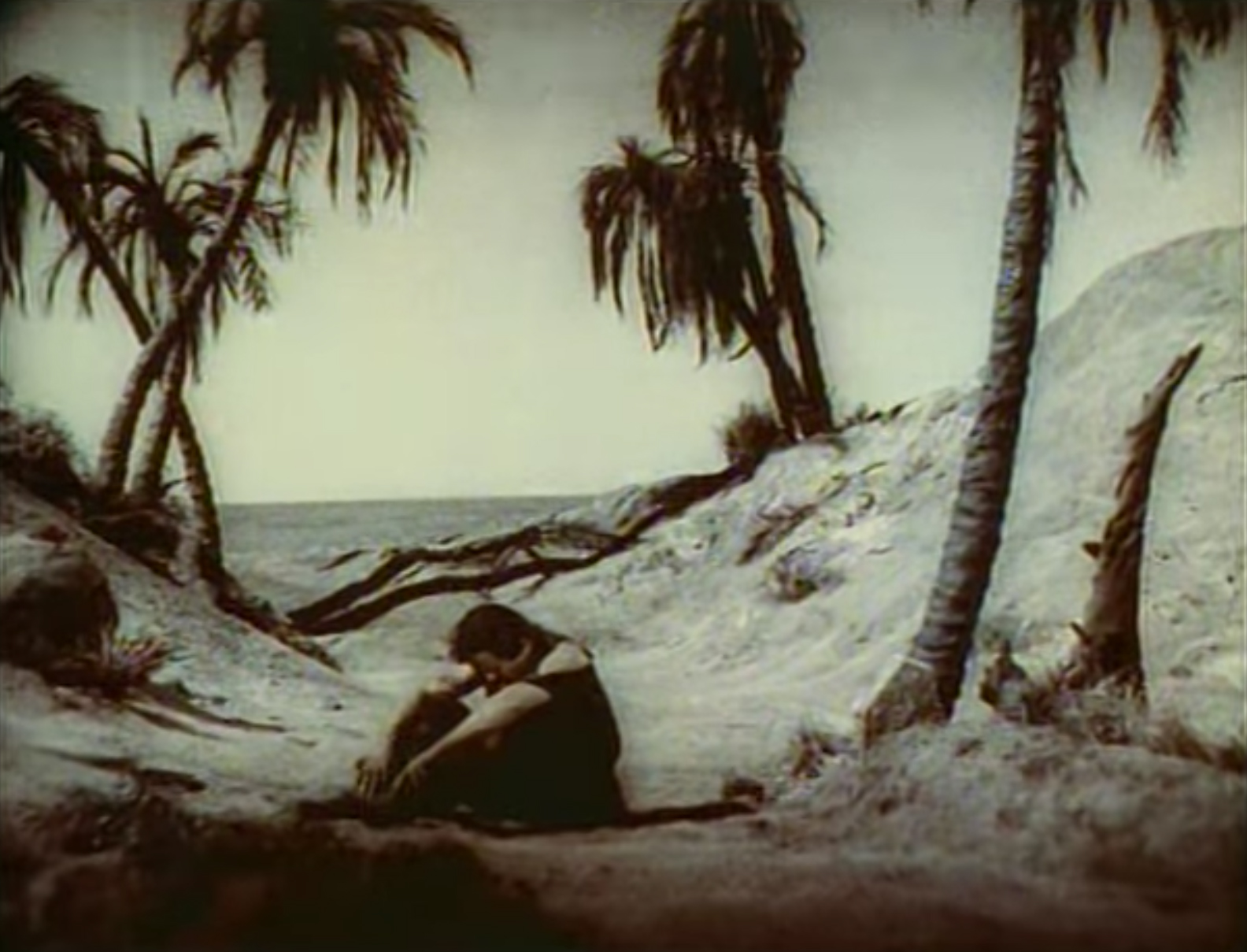
Color still of The Black Pirate

- The first feature film in color, the silent movie The Black Pirate, premiered at both the Selwyn Theatre in New York and at the Tivoli Cinema in London. Produced by and starring Douglas Fairbanks, The Black Pirate, the film was one of the highest grossing of the year, but also one of the most expensive up to that time.
- Prime Minister Stanley Baldwin addressed the British public about the ongoing strike in an evening radio broadcast. Such a broadcast in a time of emergency was the first of its kind in the United Kingdom.
- The prototype of the U.S. Navy's secret weapon, the Mark 6 exploder, was given its first test firing, attached to a Mark 10 torpedo and aimed at the submarine USS L-8. On the first try, the torpedo went underneath the target submarine but did not explode. A second test was successful.
- Belgium's Prime Minister Prosper Poullet announced his resignation and would be replaced on May 20.
- The American insurance and financial services company American International Underwriters Corporation, later to become AIG and now a part of Corebridge Financial, was founded by Gus S. Wortham.
- Maurice Ravel's composition Chansons madécasses was given its first performance.
- Wigan defeated Warrington 22–10 to win the Northern Rugby Football League championship.

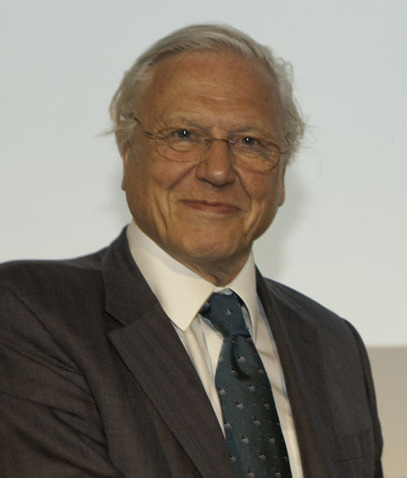
Sir David Attenborough

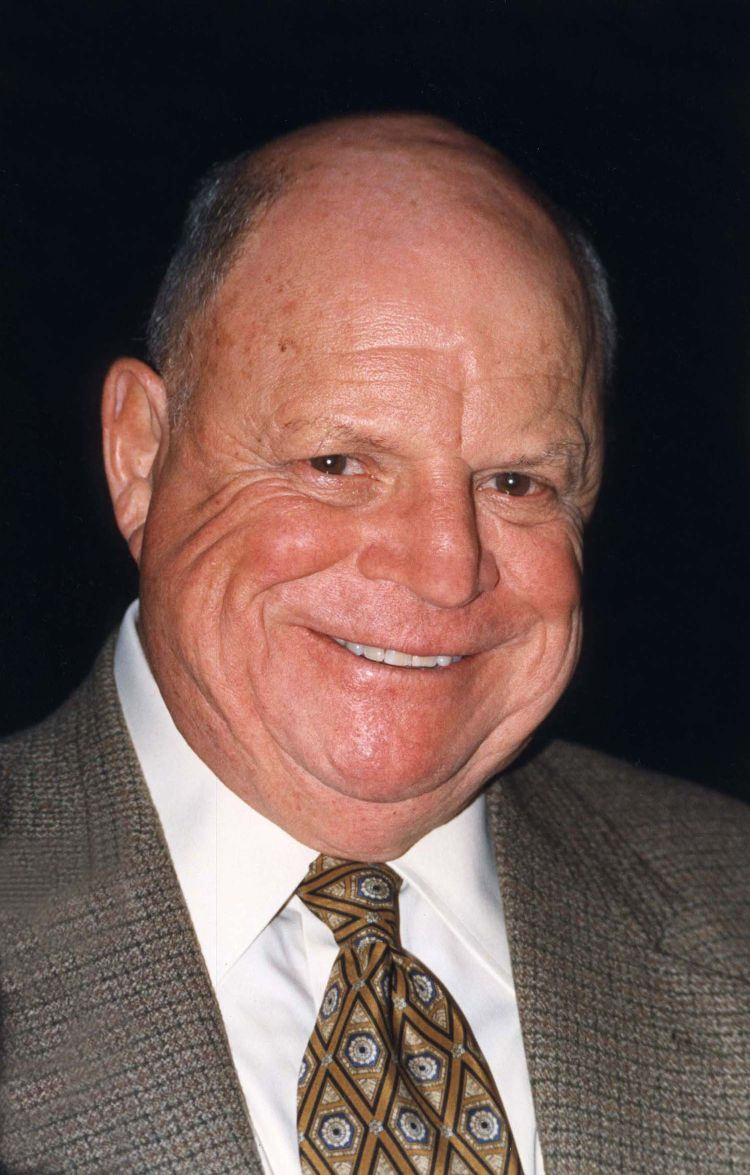
Don Rickles

- Born:
  - Sir David Attenborough, English documentary producer and naturalist; in Isleworth, London.
  - Don Rickles, American TV and film comedian who specialized in insult comedy; in Queens, New York City (d. 2017).

== May 9, 1926 (Sunday) ==
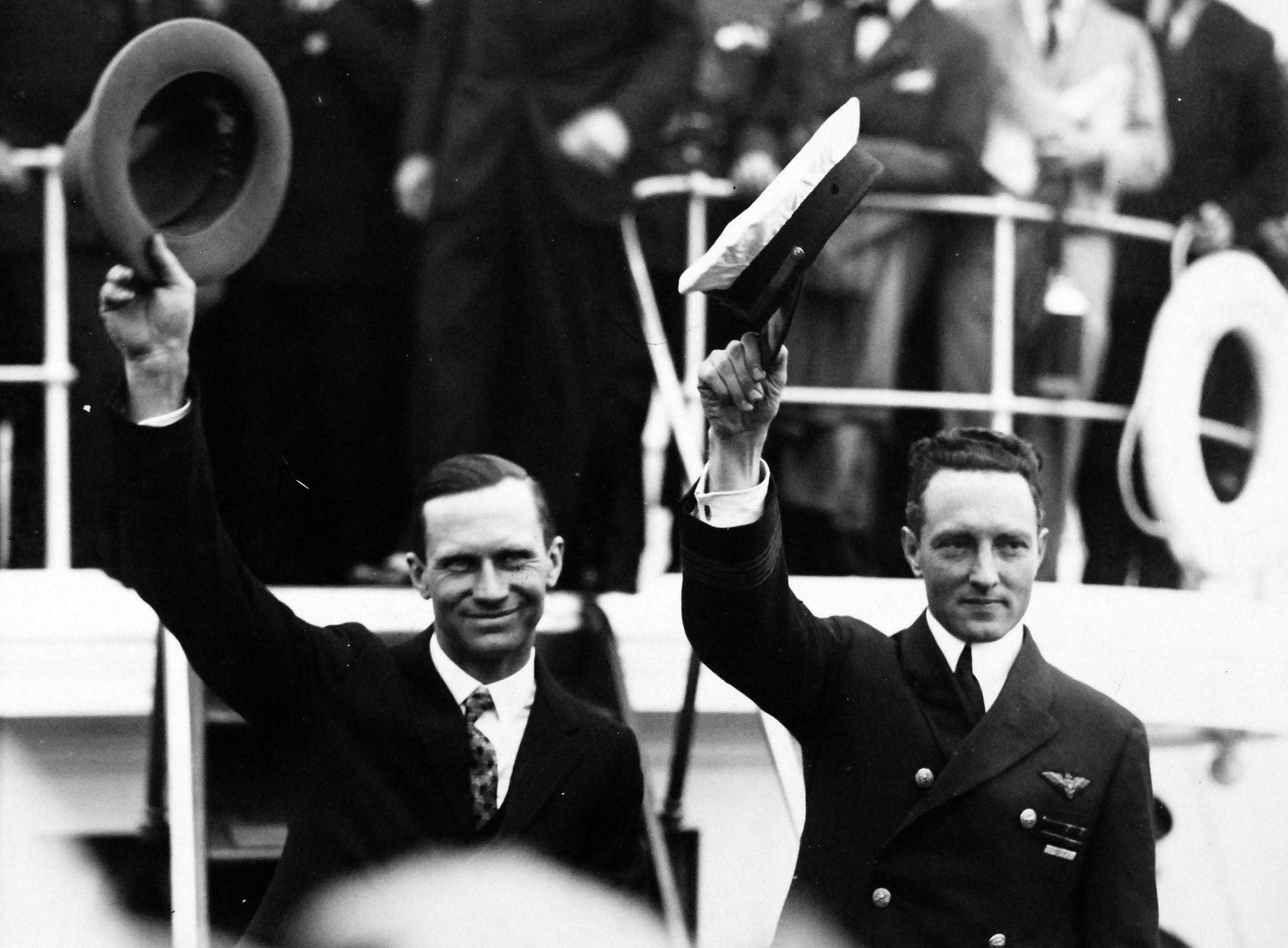
Byrd and Bennett

- Explorer Richard E. Byrd and co-pilot Floyd Bennett attempted to make the first flight over the North Pole, taking off from Spitsbergen in the Fokker F.VII monoplane Josephine Ford in Norway. They returned to Spitzbergen 15 hours and 57 minutes later, claiming that they had flown the 1,535 miles (2,470 km) to the Pole, flying over it, and then circling it "around the world" for 13 minutes. While both men were immediately hailed as national heroes, some experts have since been skeptical of the claim, with aviator Bernt Balchen concluding in 1958 that the plane was unlikely to have covered the entire distance and back in that short an amount of time. An entry in Byrd's diary discovered in 1996 suggested that the plane actually turned back 150 miles (240 km) short of the North Pole due to an oil leak. Another attempt to fly over the Pole would be made three days later by different pilots on the airship Norge.
- After Druze Muslims in Syria killed eight French soldiers in the Great Syrian Revolt, the French Army used heavy weaponry to shell a Druze neighborhood in Damascus, killing hundreds of civilians along with about 100 rebels. As a result, the area of the old city between the sections of Al-Hamidiyah Souq and Medhat Pasha Souq was burned to the ground, an event known since then as al-Hariqa ("the fire"). Reporter George Seldes viewed 308 bodies, and suggested there might be as many as 1,000 dead under the rubble. "When the Muslims, who had rebelled, threatened to kill all Christians", Seldes wrote, "General Maurice Sarrail gave the civilian population time to evacuate, then ordered Fort Gouraud to fire some warning shots, then shell the rebel sector."
- Astronomers Max Wolf and Karl Wilhelm Reinmuth became the first persons on Earth to observe the supernova SN 1926A, which had taken place in the Messier 61 galaxy more than 50 million years earlier. Seven other supernovae have been observed in Messier 61 since then.
- Died: J. M. Dent, 76, British publisher

== May 10, 1926 (Monday) ==
- Wincenty Witos formed a coalition government as the new Prime Minister of Poland, but would hold the office for only two days before being deposed in a military coup.
- The Flying Scotsman express train, traveling on the route between Edinburgh and King's Cross, London with more than 300 passengers, was derailed in Northumberland by a group of locked-out miners who pulled up the tracks, after passing Cramlington. Because the locomotive was moving slowly and the volunteer engineer spotted the missing rail, only one of the passengers was injured, but two of the train's coaches overturned in the first act of sabotage during Britain's General Strike.
- The Preakness Stakes thoroughbred horse race, at the time the first of the American Triple Crown events, was won by the horse Display, ridden by jockey John Maiben. Display won by a head over the pre-race favorite, Blondin. The Kentucky Derby was held five days later, with six of the 13 Preakness competitors, including Display and Blondin.
- France became the first nation to ratify the 1925 Geneva Protocol against the use of poison gases and biological weapons in war.
- Airplanes piloted by Major Harold Geiger and Horace Meek Hickam, students at the Air Corps Tactical School, collided in mid-air at Langley Field, Virginia. Both pilots survived; Hickham joined the Caterpillar Club by parachuting to safety.
- Born:
  - Hugo Banzer, President of Bolivia from 1971 to 1978 and again from 1997 to 2001; in Concepción, Santa Cruz (d. 2002)
  - Tichi Kassel, film personality and the publisher of The Hollywood Reporter; as Beatrice Ruby Noble in Los Angeles (d. 2004)
  - Yvette Francis-McBarnette, Jamaican-born American pediatrician and pioneer in the treatment of sickle cell anemia; in Kingston (d. 2016)
  - Dolores Beristáin, Mexican film actress and 1989 Ariel Award winner for Best Supporting Actress; in Mexico City (d. 2010)
  - Vladimir Tatosov, Soviet Russian film actor known for being the co-star, with Lyudmila Maksakova, of the 1967 historical drama Tatyana's Day (Tatyanin denya); in Moscow (d. 2021)
- Died: Alton B. Parker, 73, former Chief Judge of New York's highest court, known for being the Democratic Party nominee in the 1904 United States presidential election, which he lost to incumbent President Theodore Roosevelt.

== May 11, 1926 (Tuesday) ==
- In Britain, Mr. Justice Asbury granted an injunction to the National Sailors' and Firemen's Union to enjoin the General-Secretary of its Tower Hill branch from calling its members out on strike. Astbury ruled that the strike was not protected by the Trade Disputes Act 1906 and that the strike in the plaintiff union had been called in contravention of its own rules. The ruling came as a heavy blow to the cause of the firemen and sailors union, as well as other unions.
- The airship Norge departed Ny-Ålesund en route to the North Pole. Roald Amundsen led the 16-man crew.
- In one of the most widely condemned lynchings in the United States, Henry Patterson, an African-American, was falsely accused of attacking a white woman, then chased by a mob of more than 40 white men in LaBelle, Florida and shot to death. His body was then paraded down LaBelle's main street and hanged from a tree in front of the Hendry County courthouse. The alleged victim later told friends that she was merely frightened when Patterson approached her. Newspaper publisher Mary Hayes Davis published the details of the lynching in The Hendry County News, and the report was republished in the Tampa Morning Tribune, then sent to other newspapers by the wire services."
- Born:
  - Yvonne Furneaux (stage name for Elisabeth Yvonne Scatcherd), French-born British film actress known for The Mummy (1959), La Dolce Vita (1960), The Count of Monte Cristo (1961), and Frankenstein's Great Aunt Tillie (1984); in Roubaix, Nord-Pas-de-Calais département (d. 2024)
  - Rudolf Kassel, German philogist of the Greek language; in the independent city of Frankenthal in the Weimar Republic (d. 2020)
  - Milan C. Miskovsky, American CIA agent and negotiator; in Chicago (d. 2009)

== May 12, 1926 (Wednesday) ==
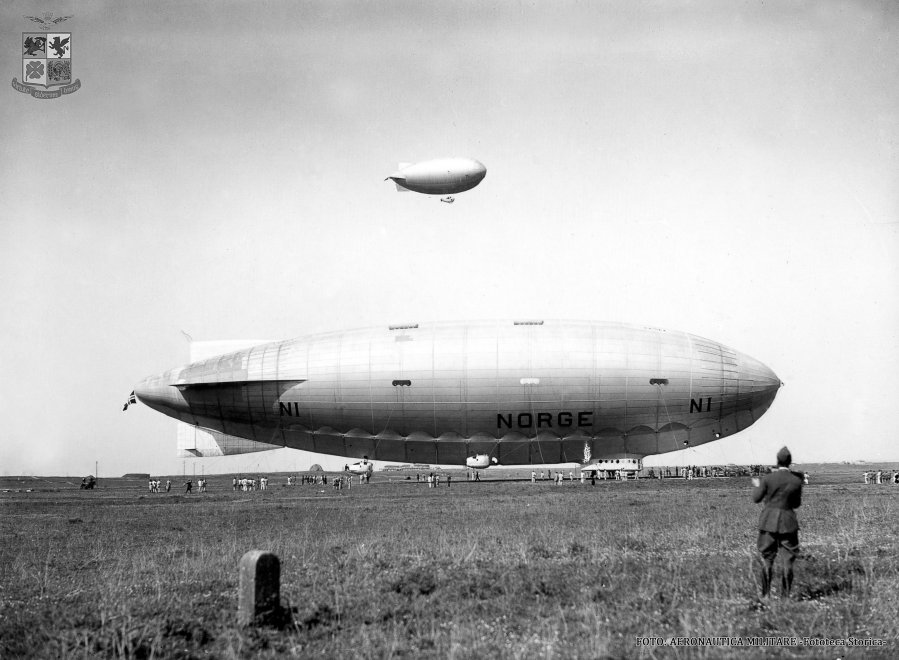
The Norge

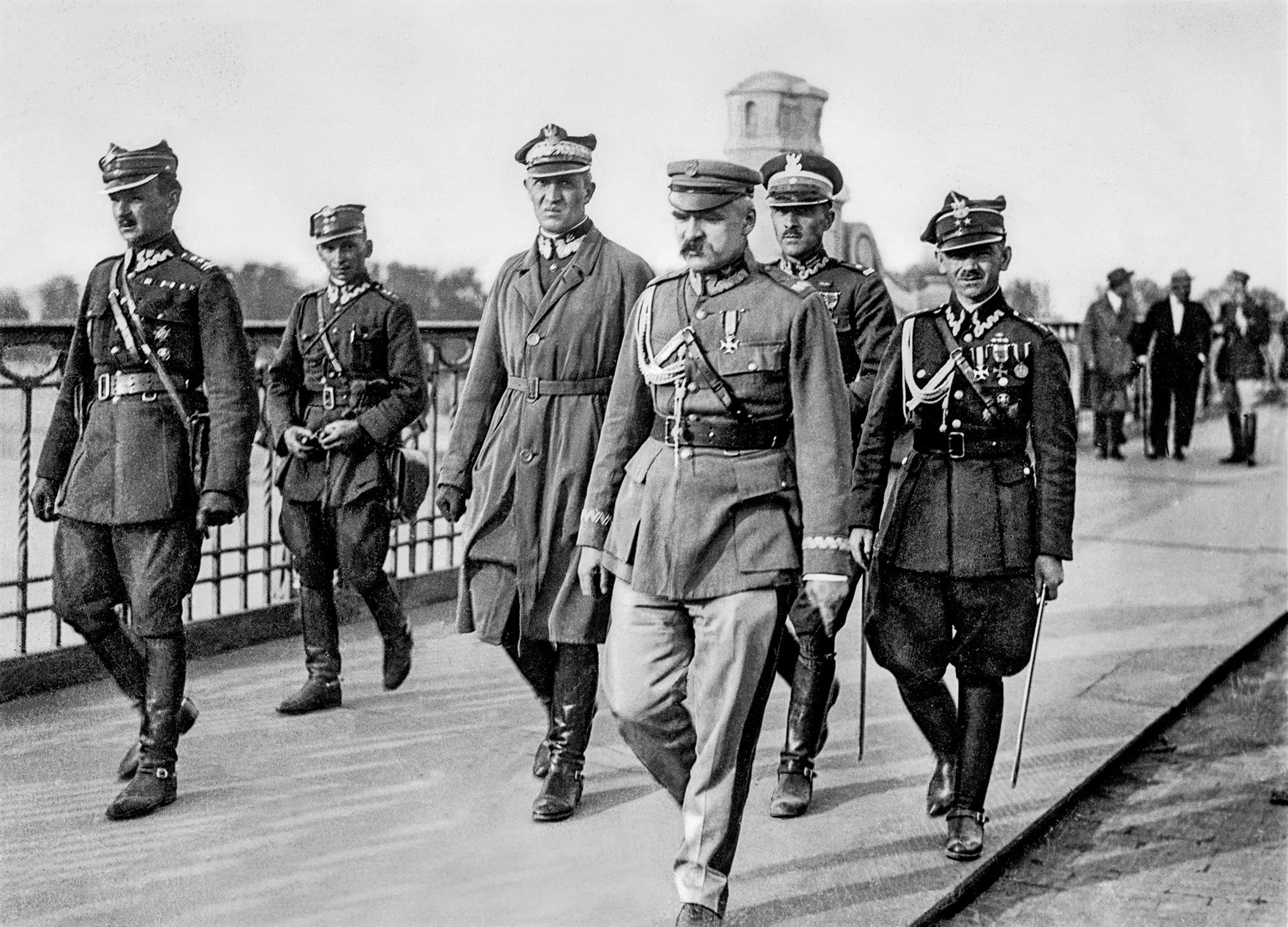
Pilsudski and his aides

- The Italian-built airship Norge, carrying Roald Amundsen, pilot Hjalmar Riiser-Larsen, Lincoln Ellsworth, Italian engineer Umberto Nobile, Norwegian Navy commander Oscar Wisting and 11 other crew members, reached the North Pole at 01:25 Greenwich time. During the flyover, Norwegian, American and Italian flags were dropped onto the ice. The Norge continued on toward Alaska in its bid to cross the entire Arctic Ocean.
- The Trades Union Congress (TUC) called off Britain's General Strike after Arthur Pugh, TUC president, reached an informal agreement with Sir Herbert Samuel, chairman of the Coal Industry Commission. The coal miners' strike continued.
- The May Coup began in Poland. A state of emergency was declared by Prime Minister Witos as units loyal to Marshal Józef Piłsudski marched on Warsaw and captured bridges over the Vistula River. At 5:00 in the afternoon, Marshal Pilsudski met with Poland's President Stanisław Wojciechowski in a discussion on the Poniatowski Bridge and demanded the resignation of the Witos cabinet within two hours. Wojciechowski, in turn, demanded that the Marshal order his troops to surrender as a condition of the Witos resignation, which was declined. Fighting began at 7:00 in the evening."
- Hans Luther resigned as Chancellor of Germany after losing a vote of no confidence in the Reichstag, with 176 for his ouster and only 146 against.
- The First Symphony of Dmitri Shostakovich was performed for the first time, premiering in Leningrad by the Leningrad Philharmonic Orchestra.

== May 13, 1926 (Thursday) ==
- Due to worsening weather in the U.S. Alaska Territory, the crew of the airship Norge decided to land rather than press on to their goal of reaching Nome. Pilot Umberto Nobile decided to attempt a landing at Teller, Alaska, on a frozen lagoon, and at 8:30 in the evening local time (14 May at 0730 UTC), in what one author described as "probably one of the most outstanding examples of airmanship of the airship era," Nobile, Natale Cecioni and Renato Alessandri guided the ship down steadily and held it in place while the crew disembarked, one at a time, to safety.
- The Hercílio Luz Bridge, the first to link Brazil's Santa Catarina Island to the mainland, was opened at Florianópolis, and remained (at 2,689 ft (820 m)) the longest suspension bridge in Brazil a century later.
- Britain started to return to normal on the first day back from the general strike, though many transport services were late in their resumption. Voluntary workers were still keeping buses and trains running. Miners remained locked out.
- Argentina's championship of soccer football, the Copa Ibarguren was contested between Boca Juniors of Buenos Aires (who had finished in first place in the Primera División) almost two years earlier in the 1924–1925 season, and Club Atlético Belgrano of Rosario, who had won the Copa Nicasio Vila, championship of the Liga Rosarina 18 months earlier.

== May 14, 1926 (Friday) ==
- At the Belweder Palace in Warsaw, Poland's, President Stanisław Wojciechowski and Prime Minister Wincenty Witos resigned their positions at 7:00 in the evening to prevent the fighting in Warsaw from becoming a country-wide civil war. Along with the rest of their government officials, they escaped to Wilanow. Over three days of fighting, 164 civilians were killed, along with 25 officers and 173 soldiers of the Polish Army. Maciej Rataj took over Wojciechowski's office as acting President.
- The Mary Pickford film Sparrows was released.
- Born: Eric Morecambe, English comedian; in Morecambe, Lancashire (d. 1984)

== May 15, 1926 (Saturday) ==
- Starting at 8:30 in the evening, Radio station Zagreb (now Croatian Radio), the first broadcast station in Southeast Europe, began broadcasting from Zagreb in Yugoslavia at a wavelength of 350 meters, equivalent to a frequency of 860 kHz on the AM radio band.
- Kazimierz Bartel took office as the new Prime Minister of Poland the day after the completion of the coup d'état led by General Jozef Pilsudski. On the same day, five Polish Army generals (including Tadeusz Rozwadowski and Włodzimierz Zagórski (general)) were arrested for the killing of civilians and Pilsudski's troops, and were sent to military prison at Antokol (now Antakalnis in Lithuania).
- The National Hockey League (NHL) admitted three teams that would continue for 100 seasons, adding the New York Rangers (owned by the same syndicate as the Madison Square Garden arena), and, contingent upon constructing finding an arena to temporarily play in, the Chicago Blackhawks and the Detroit Cougars (now the Detroit Red Wings).
- Bubbling Over won the 1926 Kentucky Derby, at the time the second race of the American Triple Crown of thoroughbred horse racing, five days after the running of the Preakness Stakes.
- The popular film Aloma of the South Seas, with dancer Gilda Gray in the title role, was released by Famous Players—Lasky, premiering at the Rialto Theatre in New York. Despite its success at the box office, Aloma was not preserved and remains one of the most successful "lost films" in the U.S. history.
- Born:
  - Sir Peter Shaffer, English playwright and screenwriter (d. 2016)
  - Anthony Shaffer, novelist and playwright (d. 2001).

The twin brothers were born in Liverpool.

== May 16, 1926 (Sunday) ==
- The Irish political party Fianna Fáil was founded at a public meeting at the La Scala Theatre on Prince's Street (now O'Connell Street) in Dublin. with Éamon de Valera as its first president.
- Hours after the death sentence was announced following the conviction of Nicola Sacco and Bartolomeo Vanzetti, the front of the U.S. Embassy to Argentina was destroyed by a bomb from a group led by Italian-born anarchist Severino Di Giovanni.
- The first championship of the new National Hurling League in Ireland was won by Cork GAA over Dublin GAA, 3–7 to 1-5 (equivalent to a 16–8 score) in the finals played at the Cork Athletic Grounds.
- FC Barcelona won Spain's Copa del Rey tournament for the seventh time, defeating Atlético Madrid 3 to 2 in extra time, with the winning goal coming from Paulino Alcántara in the 112th minute.
- Born:
  - Glen Michael (stage name for Cecil Buckland), British children's television show host known for the Scottish Television program Glen Michael's Cartoon Cavalcade; in Paignton, Devonshire (d. 2025)
  - Necla Sultan, French-born Turkish socialite, Egyptian princess consort and granddaughter of Ottoman Sultan Mehmed VI, who died on the day of her birth; in Nice (d. 2006)
- Died: Mehmed VI, 65, the last Sultan of the Ottoman Empire, who reigned from 1918 until being deposed upon the abolition of the monarchy by the Republic of Turkey in 1922, died in exile in Italy. His 13-year-old son Şehzade Mehmed Ertuğrul made no pretense of claiming the abolished throne.

== May 17, 1926 (Monday) ==
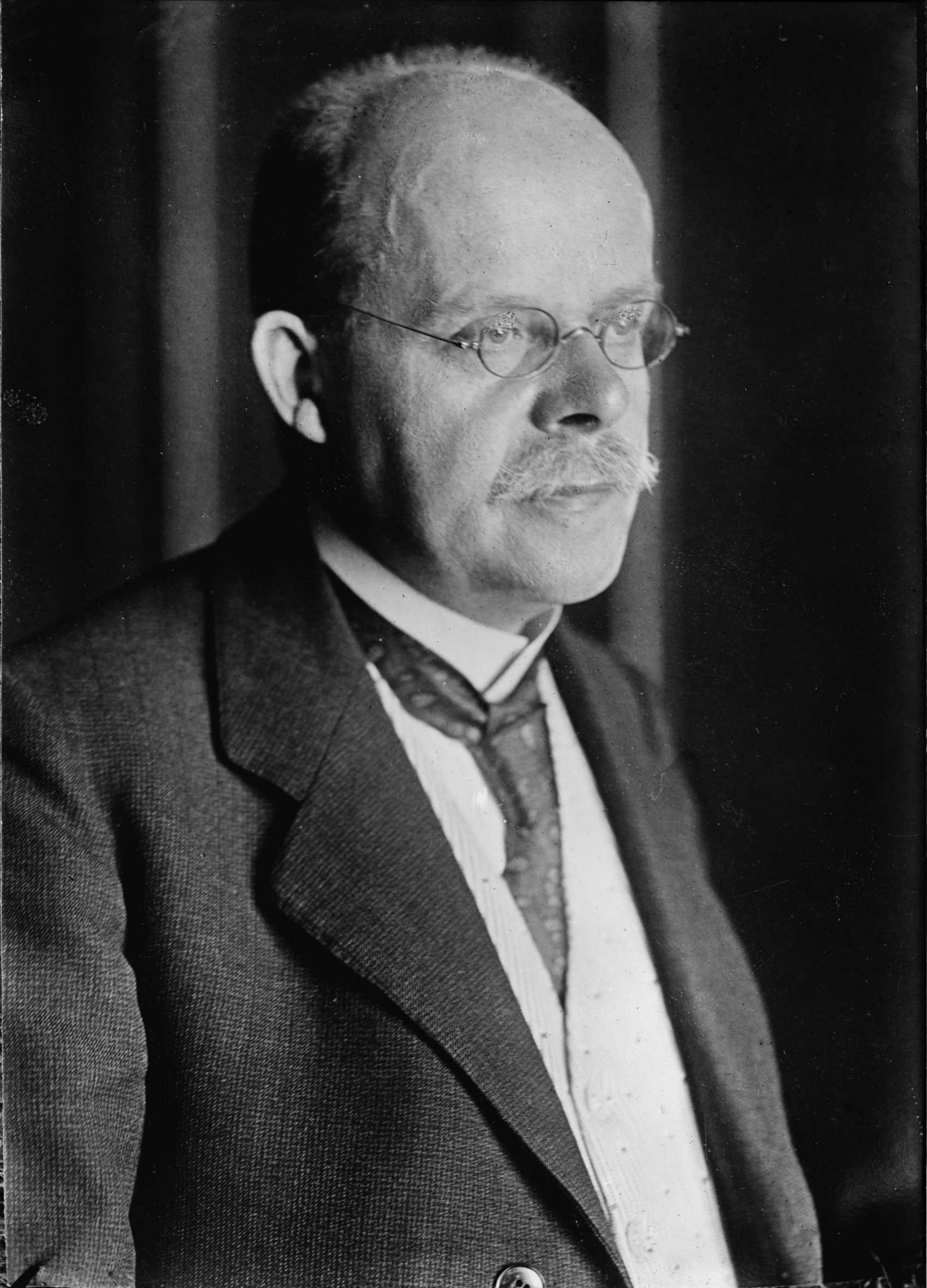
Wilhelm Marx

- Justice Minister Wilhelm Marx became Chancellor of Germany for the second time after being selected by President Paul von Hindenburg to form a new coalition government following the resignation of Hans Luther and his cabinet, who had resigned on May 12.
- IAPMO, the International Association of Plumbing and Mechanical Officials, was formed by a group of plumbing inspectors to create universal standards and building codes for builders of plumbing equipment.
- Geneviève de Brabant, written in 1900 by Erik Satie, with lyrics by Patrice Contamine de Latour, was given its first performance, after having been discovered following Satie's death in 1925. The work premiered at the Théâtre des Champs-Élysées in Paris as "an opera for marionettes", in that the legend of Genevieve had been traditionally adapted for puppet shows. During the same event, Satie's orchestral composition Cinq Grimaces pour Le Songe d'une nuit d'été ("Five Grimaces for A Midsummer Night's Dream") was premiered by conductor Roger Désormière. Latour was unable to attend the performance because of illness, and died one week afterward.
- Born:
  - Franz Sondheimer, German-born British chemist; in Stuttgart (d. 1981)
  - Allen Steck, American mountaineer and rock climber known for making the first vertical ascents of various mountains, and famous for the "Steck-Salathé Route" on Sentinel Rock in California's Yosemite National Park; in Oakland, California (d. 2023)
  - Harry W. Shlaudeman, American diplomat who served as the U.S. ambassador to Venezuela, Peru, Argentina, Brazil and Nicaragua; in Los Angeles (d. 2018)
  - Prince Dimitri Romanov, French-born claimant to the throne of the defunct Russian monarchy and to leadership of the House of Romanov from 2014 until his death, as a great-grandson of Tsar Nicholas I; in Cap d'Antibes, Alpes-Maritimes département (d. 2016)

== May 18, 1926 (Tuesday) ==
- Aimee Semple McPherson, a nationally famous Christian evangelist, disappeared after last being seen swimming at Venice Beach, California, near Los Angeles. Initial speculation was that she had drowned, and a memorial service was held at the Angelus Temple she had founded. After more than five weeks, McPherson would reappear in Mexico near the U.S. border on June 23, claiming that she had been kidnapped and held for ransom.
- Born:
  - Dirch Passer, Danish comedian and film actor; in Østerbro, Copenhagen (died of a heart attack, 1980)
  - Joe Brown, American boxer and world lightweight champion from 1956 to 1962; in Baton Rouge, Louisiana (d. 1997)
  - Niranjan Bhagat, Indian Gujarati poet; in Ahmedabad, Bombay Presidency, British India (d. 2018)
- Died:
  - Elinor Hallé, 69, English sculptor and co-inventor (with Anne Acheson) of the process of plaster casts for immobilization of broken limbs
  - James Thomson Bottomley, 81, Irish-born British physicist known for his creation of four-digit logarithm tables for the most accurate multiplication and division calculations of the 19th century
  - John L. Morrison, 63, American publisher and founder of the controversial newspaper Ripsaw in Duluth, Minnesota

== May 19, 1926 (Wednesday) ==
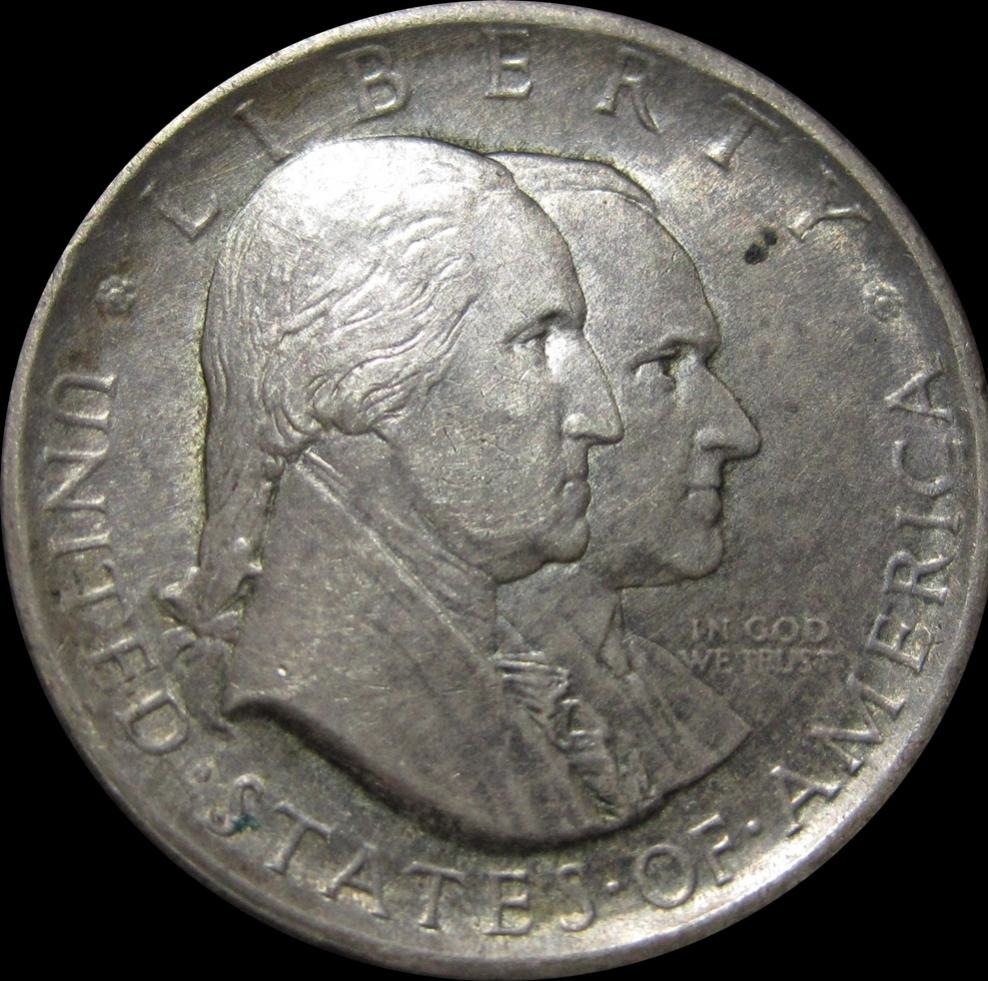
Washington and Coolidge on the half dollar

- The first and only official coinage to feature an incumbent U.S. president was minted at Philadelphia by the U.S. Mint, in commemoration of the 150th anniversary of the U.S. Declaration of Independence. The sesquicentennial half dollar featured the first U.S. president, George Washington, and the incumbent President, Calvin Coolidge.
- In China, Zhang Renjie became the first Chairman of the Kuomintang (since the 1925 death of Sun Yatsen) in the Republic of China, after a period of 14 months during which the party and the Republic were ruled by a 3-member Central Executive Committee.
- The French Air Force bombed Damascus, trying to suppress the ongoing revolt.

== May 20, 1926 (Thursday) ==
- The Air Commerce Act, providing for the first licensing of pilots and for commercial airplanes, was signed into law by U.S. President Calvin Coolidge after having passed both houses of the U.S. Congress. The Act created the Aeronautics Branch within the U.S. Department of Commerce to implement and enforce regulations.
- The Railway Labor Act was signed into law by U.S. President Coolidge, abolishing the Railroad Labor Board. The "Wilson-Parker Act" had been drawn up by the Association of Railway Executives and Railway Brotherhoods", and provided for five-member federal mediation board for resolving controversies.
- Pete Latzo won the World Welterweight Boxing Title, defeating Mickey Walker in Scranton, Pennsylvania, in a 10-round unanimous decision.
- Henri Jaspar formed a government as the new Prime Minister of Belgium. Formerly the Foreign Minister of Belgium, Jaspar replaced Prosper Poullet, who had resigned with his government on May 8.
- Australia's Great White Train, a promotion to buy Australian-made products, concluded its first tour after making 61 stops in the state of New South Wales. A second New South Wales tour of three months began the following spring on August 25, 1926.
- Born:
  - Munir Ahmad Khan, Pakistani nuclear engineer and chairman of the Pakistan Atomic Energy Commission, known for helping develop Pakistan's first atomic bomb in 1998; in Kasur, Punjab Province, British India (d. 1999)
  - John Lucarotti, English screenwriter; in Aldershot, Hampshire (d. 1994)

== May 21, 1926 (Friday) ==
- The regents of the Banque de France, the French national reserve bank, led by Banque Governor Georges Robineau, agreed to the demand by Prime Minister Aristide Briand and Finance Minister Raoul Péret for use of gold reserves to back up the falling exchange value of the French franc by purchasing up to one billion francs ($200 million U.S. dollars) worth of French money held abroad. The franc had fallen to 3.01 cents American (with a U.S. dollar being worth 33.25 francs), and rose to 3.25 cents American (a dollar worth 30.8 francs).
- The government of Nicaragua announced that it was releasing 140 political prisoners who had been arrested after a revolution had broken out on May 2. Violence had subsided after the U.S. Navy had landed troops in Nicaragua to protect American interests.
- Born:
  - Albert Grossman, American talent manager known for managing Bob Dylan, Janis Joplin and Peter, Paul and Mary; in Chicago (d. 1986).
  - Ma Chen-shan, Chinese Olympian for the Taiwan sport shooting team in 1964, known for defecting to the People's Republic of China after the Olympics and suspect in the poisoning of decathlon competitor C. K. Yang; in Tongliao, Liaobei province, Republic of China
  - Robert Creeley, U.S. poet, in Arlington, Massachusetts (d. 2005)
- Died: H. V. McKay, 60. Australian industrialist known for perfecting the combine harvester and creating the Sunshine Header-Harvester

== May 22, 1926 (Saturday) ==
- U.S. President Calvin Coolidge signed an act authorizing the creation of the Great Smoky Mountains National Park, despite the lack of federally-owned land at the proposed site. Under the act, creation of the area as a federally-protected national park was contingent upon the donation the U.S. government of land in the Appalachian Mountains to be purchased from private owners by the governments of the U.S. states of Tennessee and North Carolina.
- Elections were held in Egypt for the 211 seats of the Parliament of Egypt. Control of the government remained with the Wafd Party (Ḥizb al-Wafd), which won 171 seats, and the Liberal Constitutional Party finished a distant second with 29 seats.
- The St. Louis Cardinals held "Rogers Hornsby Day", where the player-manager was presented $1,000 in gold and a medal for being named the National League's Most Valuable Player for 1925. Hornsby then went 2-for-4 in a 9-2 Cardinals win over the Philadelphia Phillies.
- Born: Nikolai Delone, Soviet Russian physicist known for making the first observations of multiphoton ionization and for the ADK formula relating to tunnel ionization in laser fields; in Leningrad (now Saint Petersburg) (d. 2008)
- Died: Ernest Septimus Reynolds, 65, British scientist known for his 1900 identification of the presence of dangerous levels of arsenic in beer brewed in Manchester

== May 23, 1926 (Sunday) ==
- The first Constitution of Lebanon was promulgated by the administrators of France's Mandate for Lebanon declaring the Lebanese Republic and providing for the transition of Lebanon to independence and limited self-government. The new constitution was modeled after that of the French Third Republic, with a bicameral parliament, a president and a council of ministers to be led by a prime minister.
- An estimated 30,000 members of the Communist Party of Germany demonstrated in Berlin. About 50,000 members of Der Stahlhelm held a demonstration of their own in Düsseldorf.
- Born:
  - Aileen Clarke Hernandez, African-American rights activist who served as the second president of the National Organization for Women and was later the first woman to serve on the Equal Employment Opportunity Commission; in Brooklyn, New York City (d. 2017)
  - Yossel Joe Slovo, Lithuanian-born South African activist, commander of the paramilitary uMkhonto weSizwe and later General Secretary of the South African Communist Party from 1984 to 1991; in Obeliai, Republic of Lithuania (d. 1995)

== May 24, 1926 (Monday) ==
- The eruption of the Mount Tokachi volcano killed 140 people At 12:11 in the afternoon local time, an explosion happened at the western slope of the volcano, causing a hot volcanic avalanche that reached the town of Furano at 12:35, and buried residents closest to the volcano.
- The Zenkoku Jiren, referred to in English as the All-Japan National Libertarian Federation of Trade Unions, was founded in Japan.
- The Kingdom of Iraq extended the "D'Arcy Concession" of the oil fields or "Transferred Territories" in the Diyala Governorate for an additional 35 years past its scheduled expiration date of May 27, 1961. The extension was set to expire on May 27, 1996. The terms would be renegotiated in 1951, and the concession would end in 1958.
- Born: Stanley Baxter, Scottish British television comedian known for BBC's The Stanley Baxter Show and subsequent variety shows ; in Glasgow (d. 2025)

== May 25, 1926 (Tuesday) ==
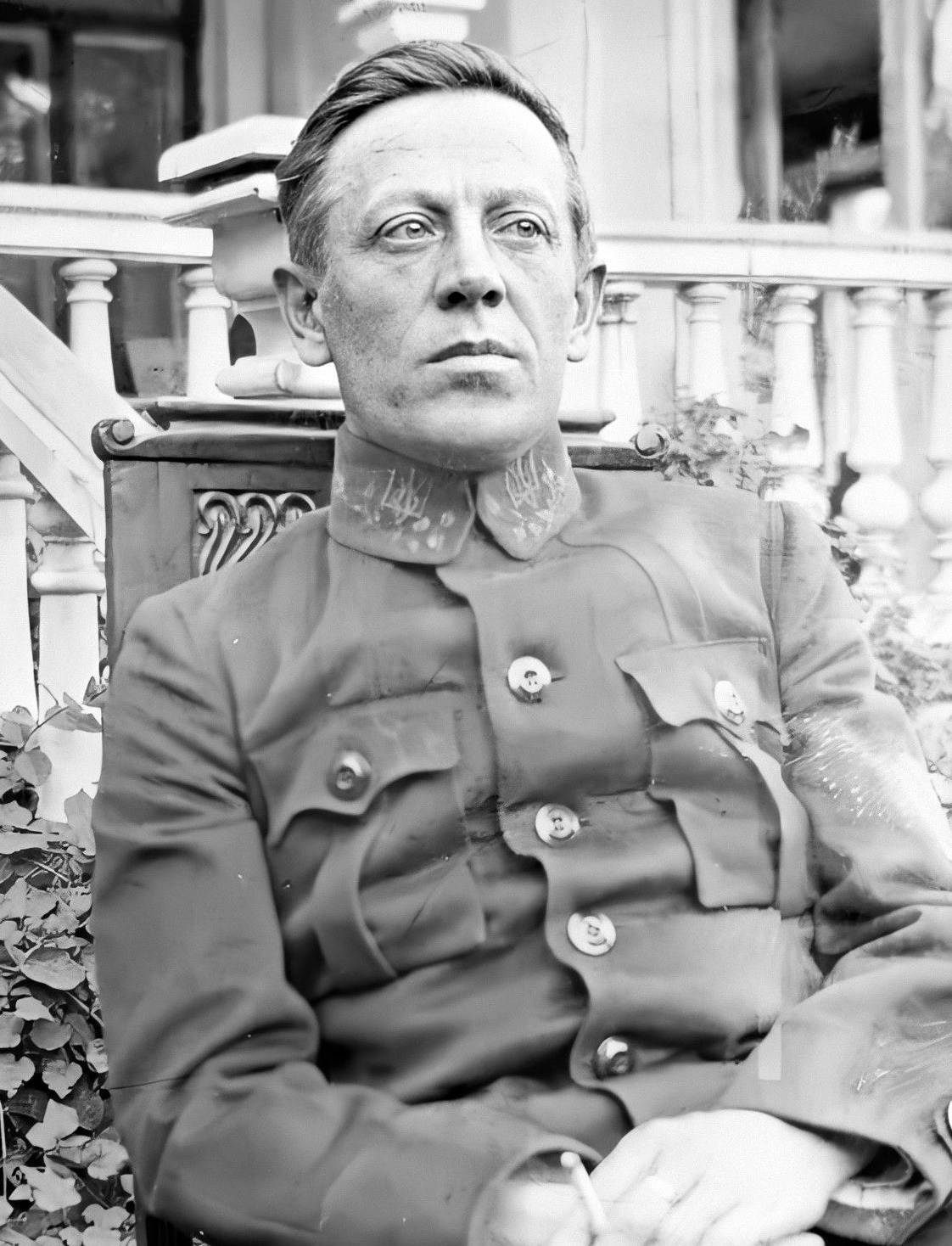
Petlura

- Ukrainian nationalist leader Symon Petliura, who had been Ukraine's president from 1919 to 1920 as Chairman of the Directorate of Ukraine, was assassinated by the Jewish anarchist poet Sholom Schwartzbard in the center of Paris. Schwartzbard saw Petliura walking by the Gibert bookstore on Boulevard Saint-Michel, accused of being "killer of my people", then shot Petliura five times at close range at 2:12 in the afternoon. Petliura died minutes later at the Charité hospital.
- Parliamentary elections were held for all 387 seats of the Kingdom of Romania's Camera Deputaților Chamber of Deputies and half of the 115 sets in the Senat. The government's People's Party (Partidul Poporului) won 292 out of the seats in the Chamber, while the National Peasants' Party (Partidul Național Țărănesc) finished a distant second with 69.
- U.S. President Coolidge signed the Public Buildings Act into law, providing funding for construction of federal buildings for the first time in 13 years.
- Born:
  - Bill Sharman, American basketball player and coach, two-time inductee to the Basketball Hall of Fame as both a player and coach, known for winning coaching teams to championships in three leagues (the ABL (1962), the ABA (1971) and the NBA (1972) ; in Abilene, Texas (d. 2013)
  - Claude Akins, American character actor, in Nelson, Georgia (d. 1994)
- Died: Symon Petliura, 47, Ukrainian independence fighter

== May 26, 1926 (Wednesday) ==
- The Rif War came to an end after 5-years as Abd el-Krim, the leader of the Riffians nationalist group and the president of the Rif Republic, surrendered to the French General Philippe Petain in Morocco. The capitulation took place at el-Krim's headquarters in the Rif capital, the Moroccan city of Targuist.
- A powerful cyclone and resulting tidal wave struck Burma at 8:30 in the evening and killed an estimated 2,800 people as villages in the Naf River valley and the Arkakan coast were swept away.
- Charles Debbas was elected as the first President of Lebanon by both chambers of the Lebanese Congress, to be sworn in on September 1.
- In the first and only destructive test of the U.S. Navy's new magnetic influence torpedo, the decommissioned submarine USS L-8 was struck and sunk off of the coast of Newport, Rhode Island.
- In Budapest in Hungary, 22 of the 24 defendants in the trial for conspiracy and forgery of French bank notes were convicted although the sentences given by the court were relatively light based on a finding that the motive of patriotism was a mitigating circumstance. Prince Windisch-Graetz Lajos received the longest sentence, four years in prison, Imre Nádosy had 3 1/2 years, and three others were sentenced to at least one year. Prime Minister István Bethlen, who had been aware of the scandal but was not directly involved, was never charged
- Born: Miles Davis; American jazz musician, trumpeter and bandleader; in Alton, Illinois (d. 1991)
- Died:
  - Vendela Andersson-Sörensen, 64, Swedish operatic soprano.
  - Srečko Kosovel, 22, Slovenian poet, died from meningitis.

== May 27, 1926 (Thursday) ==
- Belgium, France, Great Britain and Netherlands signed the Belgian Neutrality Treaty (which was dated May 22) in Paris endorsing the 1925 treaty between Belgium and the Netherlands and formally abrogating the 1839 Treaty of London.
- The Rif Republic was disestablished.
- Born:
  - Kees Rijvers, Dutch footballer with 33 caps for the Netherlands national team; in Breda (d. 2024)
  - Ajagungbade III, Nigerian traditional ruler (Oba of Ogbomosho (now in Oyo State) from 1973 to 2021; in Ogbomosho (d. 2021)

== May 28, 1926 (Friday) ==
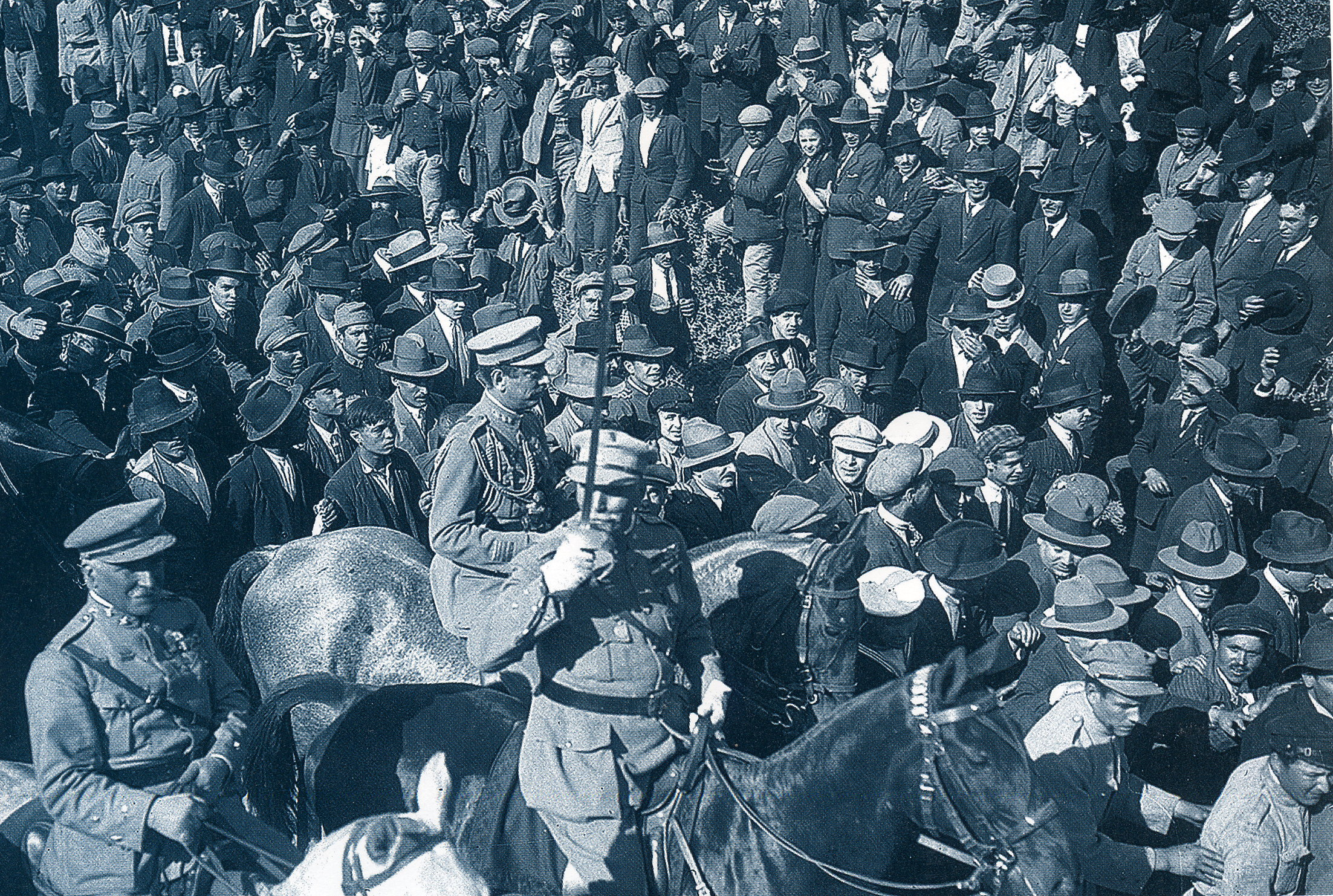
Gomes da Costa leading the uprising

- In Portugal, General Manuel Gomes da Costa and four other generals began an attempt to overthrow the government of President Bernardino Machado and Prime Minister António Maria da Silva. At 8:00 in the morning the city of Braga., Gomes da Costa and a combination of soldiers from the Eighth Division of the Portuguese Army began marching southward toward Lisbon, 225 miles (362 km) away, while Machado and da Silva prepared a resistance. Provincial military units from other cities joined in the coup. The next day, da Silva and his cabinet announced their resignations.
- At the Alipore jail in Calcutta in British India, imprisoned Bengali independence activists Pramod Ranjan Choudhury and Anantahari Mitra participated in the killing of Bhupendranath Chatterjee, a deputy superintendent of the government's Police Intelligence Branch. Out of five prisoners charged with participating in Chatterjee's death, Choudhury and Mitra were convicted of murder and hanged on September 28, 1926.
- Died: L. Herbert Jones, 22, American race car driver, died one day after being fatally injured when his car crashed in the qualifying round for the upcoming Indianapolis 500.

== May 29, 1926 (Saturday) ==
- A military coup, started by General Gomes da Costa the day before, accomplished the takeover of Portugal without loss of life. The Ditadura Nacional (National Dictatorship) was established. Portuguese Navy Admiral José Mendes Cabeçadas was designated as Chairman of the Ditadura's four-member Public Salvation Junta and formally appointed as Prime Minister of Portugal by the outgoing President, Bernardino Machado, who resigned three days later.
- Princess Elizabeth of York of England, the first granddaughter (and third grandchild) of the United Kingdom's King George V, was christened as Princess Elizabeth Alexandra Mary of the House of Windsor in the private chapel of Buckingham Palace.
- Born:
  - Abdoulaye Wade, President of Senegal from 2000 to 2012; in Kébémer.
  - Halaevalu Mataʻaho ʻAhomeʻe, member of Tongan royalty, Queen consort of Tonga as wife of Tāufaʻāhau Tupou IV from 1965 to 2006, and Queen mother from 2006 to 2017 as the mother of King George Tupou V (who reigned 2006-2012) and his successor King Aho'eitu Tupou VI; in Tonga. (d. 2017)
  - Katie Boyle, Italian-born British singer, actress, TV host and advice columnist; in Florence. (d. 2018)
  - Dhiruben Patel, Indian novelist, playwright and publisher; in Baroda, Baroda princely state, British India (now in the state of Gujarat). (d. 2023)
- Died: Dr. Carlos MacDonald, 80, American psychiatrist and prosecution expert witness

== May 30, 1926 (Sunday) ==
- António Maria da Silva resigned as Prime Minister of Portugal.
- The drama film The Unknown Soldier opened.
- Born: Tsuneo Watanabe, Japanese media executive known for owning the Yomiuri Shimbun newspaper and the Nippon Television Network; in Tokyo (d. 2024)

== May 31, 1926 (Monday) ==
- The Polish Sejm elected Marshal Piłsudski President of the Republic, but he refused the position due to its limited powers.
- Auguste Adib Pacha became the first Prime Ministers of Lebanon.
- José Mendes Cabeçadas became both President and Prime Minister of Portugal.
- The opening ceremonies for the Sesquicentennial Exposition, celebrating the 150th anniversary of the signing of the U.S. Declaration of Independence, were held in Philadelphia.
- India, New Zealand and the West Indies were elected as full members of the Imperial Cricket Conference, joining Australia, England and South Africa and raising the number of nations playing Test cricket from three to six, though membership was limited to nations within the British Commonwealth.
- Frank Lockhart won the Indianapolis 500.
- In the American Soccer League, the highest-ranking soccer football league in the United States, the championship playoff, the Lewis Cup, was won by the New Bedford Whalers of Massachusetts, by an aggregate of 5 to 4 in after the second game of the two-game series. The Whalers beat the ASL New York Giants, 5 to 1, in the first game on May 22 and, needing four goals to tie the game and five to win, the Giants defeated the Whalers 3 to 0, coming up short. Fall River F.C. of Rhode Island, who finished first in the ASL regular season with a record of 30 wins, 12 draws and 2 losses (30-12-2), ahead of the Whalers' (28-5-11), but declined to participate in the Lewis Cup tournament.
- Born:
  - Jean-Baptiste Ntidendereza, Interior Minister of Burundi who was later convicted of attempting to murder a political opponent and was publicly executed; in Irabiro (d. 1963)
  - Noboru Kikuta, Japanese gynecologist known for falsifying birth certificates in order to facilitate anonymous adoptions for paying customers; in Ishinomaki, Miyagi Prefecture. (d. 1991)
