= June 1926 =

Month of 1926

<<	June 1926					>>
Su	Mo	Tu	We	Th	Fr	Sa
		1	2	3	4	5
6	7	8	9	10	11	12
13	14	15	16	17	18	19
20	21	22	23	24	25	26
27	28	29	30

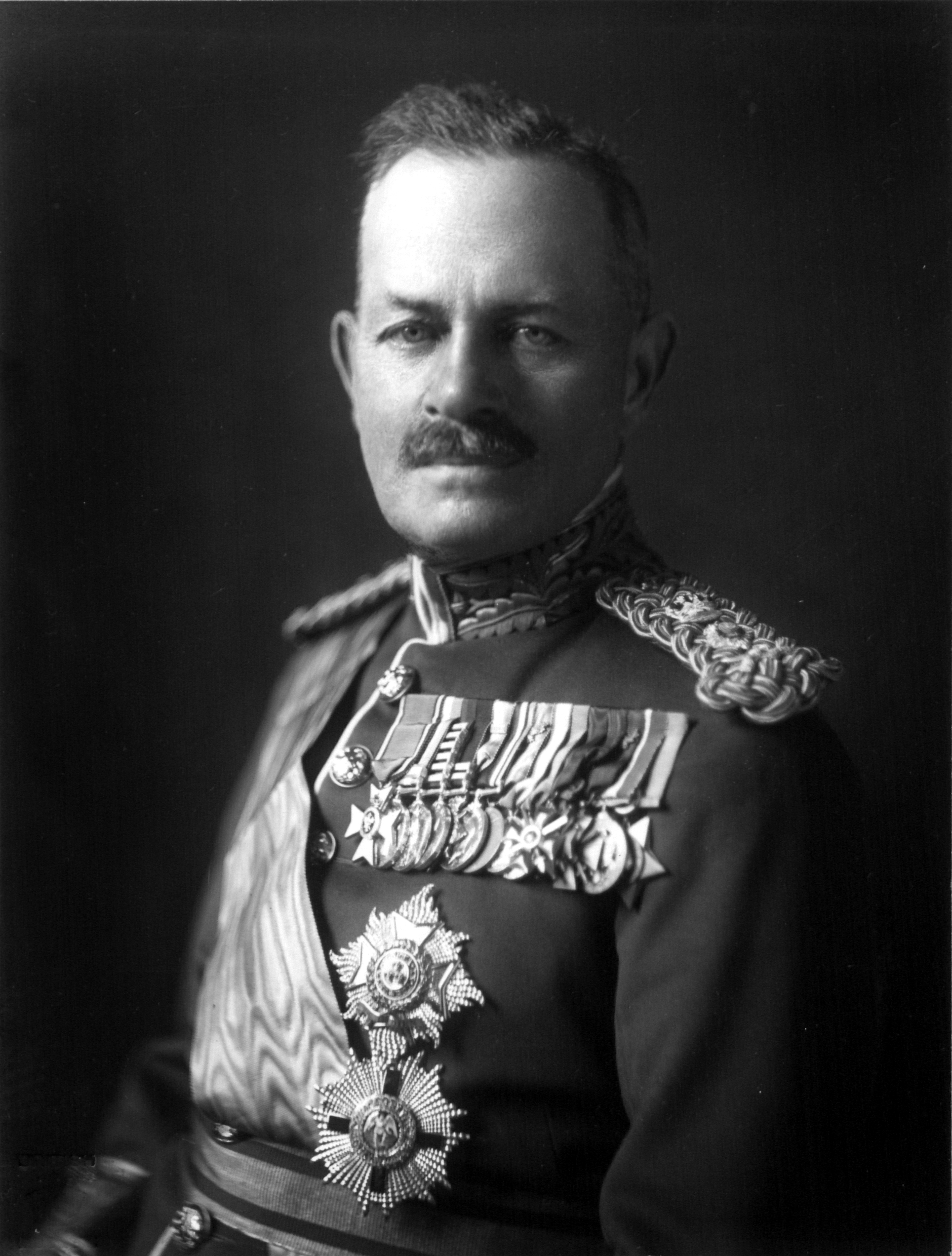
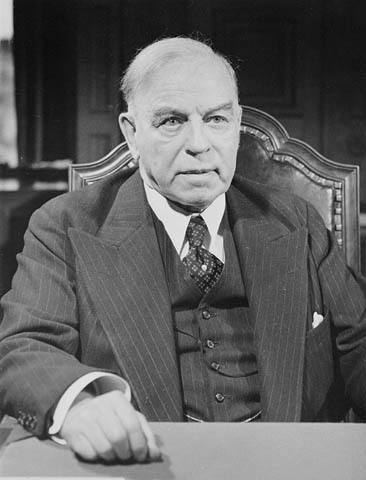
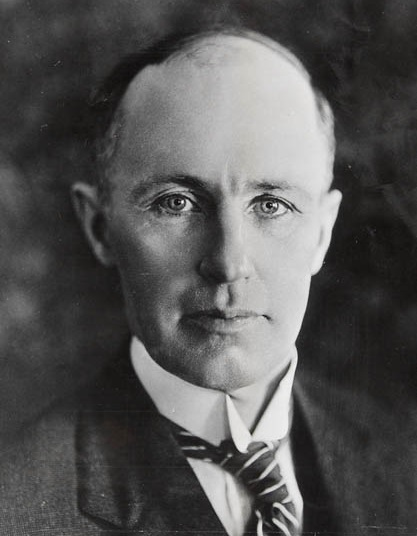
June 28, 1926: Canada's Governor-General Lord Byng forces resignation of Prime Minister King, and replaces him with opposition leader Meighen.

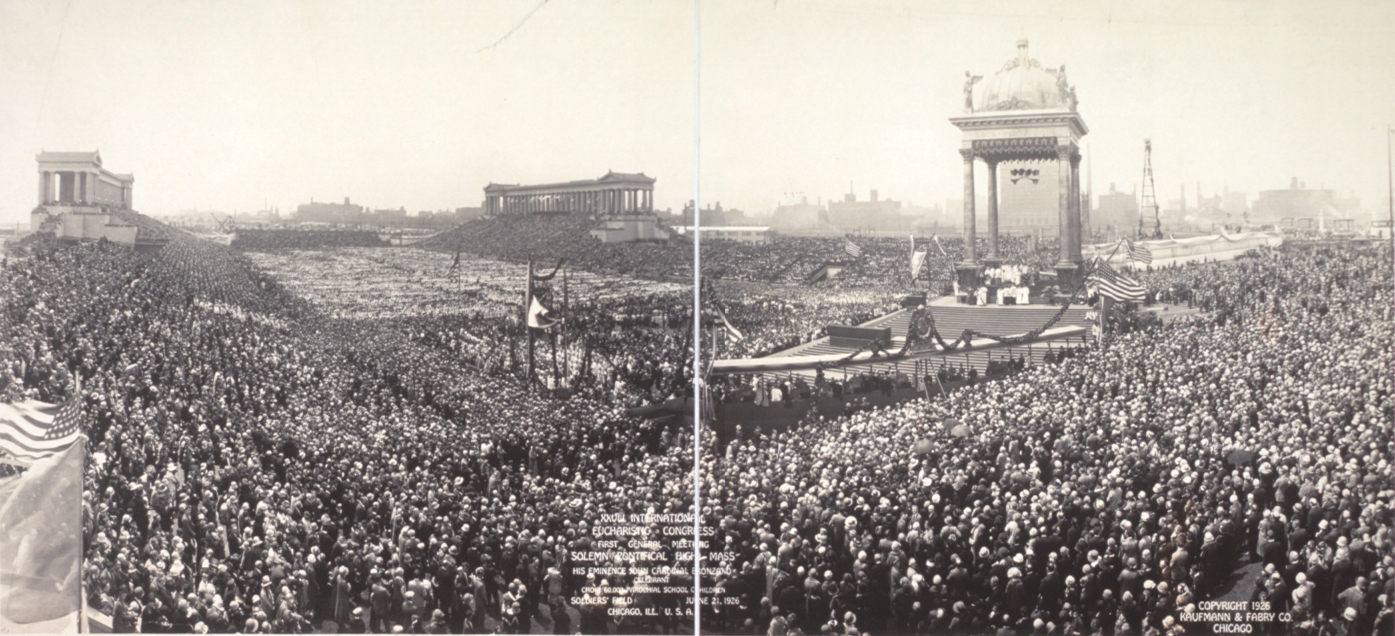
June 21, 1926: More than 100,000 people assemble at Chicago to hear a children's choir of 60,000 students.

The following events occurred in June 1926:

== June 1, 1926 (Tuesday) ==
- After General Józef Piłsudski declined to accept the position of President of Poland following his coup d'état, the nation's parliament, the Sejm, elected Ignacy Mościcki to the largely ceremonial position.
- The Hudson River Day Line ship PS Washington Irving, which had transported passengers between New York City and Albany, New York since 1913, sank after being struck by another ship in the North River during a fog. Three passengers (out of almost 300 people on board) drowned but the remainder were rescued before the vessel sank while being towed to Jersey City, New Jersey, but the accident halted construction of the underwater Holland Tunnel. The wreckage of the Washington Irving would not be cleared until eight months later on February 13, 1927.
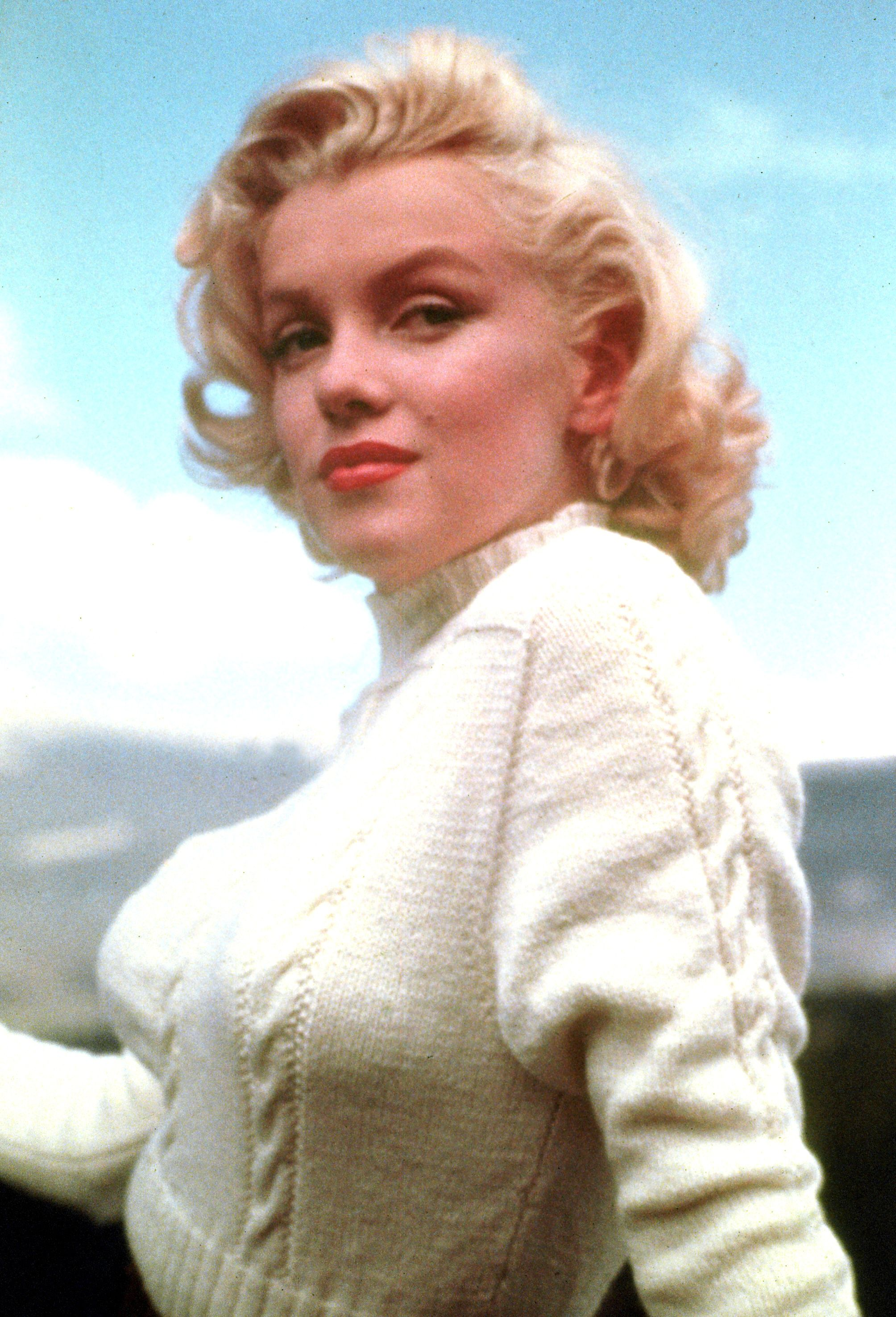
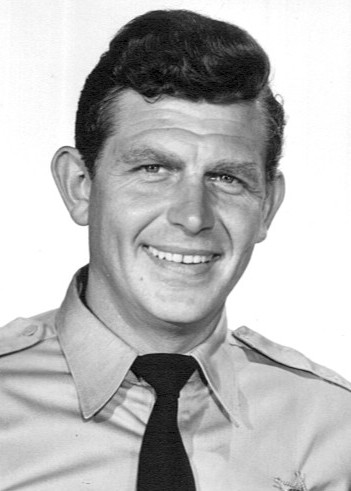
Marilyn Monroe (1926–1962) and Andy Griffith (1926–2012)
- Born:
  - Marilyn Monroe, American film actress and model; as Norma Jeane Mortenson, in Los Angeles (d. 1962)
  - Andy Griffith, American television actor and singer best known for The Andy Griffith Show and for Matlock; in Mount Airy, North Carolina (d. 2012)
  - Albert Starr, American cardiovascular surgeon and co-inventor of the Starr-Edwards heart valve; in New York City (d. 2024)
  - Richard S. Schweiker, American politician who served in the U.S. Congress for 20 years as a Representative and then as a Senator, and later as U.S. Secretary of Health and Human Services; in Norristown, Pennsylvania (d. 2015)

== June 2, 1926 (Wednesday) ==
- Sweden's Prime Minister, Rickard Sandler, resigned along with his entire cabinet after both chambers of the Riksdag voted in favor of reductions in the budget for unemployment relief.
- Jonas Staugaitis was elected head of the Seimas in Lithuania.

== June 3, 1926 (Thursday) ==
- The best-selling British book The Diary of a Young Lady of Fashion in the Year 1764–1765 by Cleone Knox, which had been billed as an 18th-century diary discovered and published for the first time in 1925, was exposed as a hoax. Magdalen King-Hall, the young daughter of Admiral Sir George Fowler King-Hall, was revealed to be the real author.
- Born:
  - Allen Ginsberg, American poet associated with the Beat Generation; in Newark, New Jersey (d. 1997)
  - Roscoe Bartlett, American congressman for Maryland from 1993 to 2013; in Moorland, Kentucky (still living in 2026)

== June 4, 1926 (Friday) ==
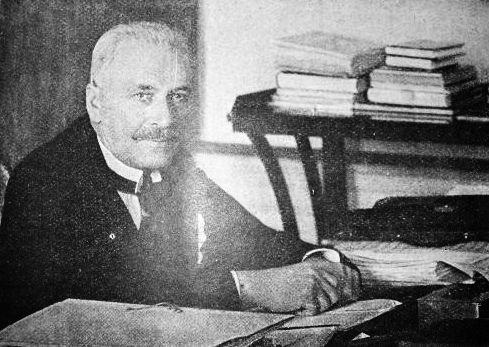
President Mościcki

- Ignacy Mościcki became President of the Republic of Poland. He would serve until 1939, fleeing Poland when Germany and the Soviet Union invaded to start World War II.
- The U.S. Congress passed a resolution requesting that President Calvin Coolidge issue a proclamation calling for the annual observance of Armistice Day with "appropriate ceremonies." Although twenty-seven U.S. states had already established November 11 as a legal holiday, Veterans Day would not become a legal Federal holiday until 1938.
- Born: Konstantin Kotsev, Turkish-born Bulgarian film actor; in Istanbul (d. 2007)
- Died:
  - Fred Spofforth, 72, Australian cricket team player and inductee to the ICC Hall of Fame, known for being the first bowler to take 50 Test wickets and the first to take a Test hat-trick
  - U.S. Army Major General Charles F. Humphrey, 81, Medal of Honor recipient and U.S. Army officer

== June 5, 1926 (Saturday) ==
- Representatives of the United Kingdom, the British Mandate for Iraq, and Turkey signed the Frontier Treaty of 1926, an agreement on the border between Turkey and Iraq to resolve the Mosul question. The parties agreed that the Mosul Province (now the Nineveh Governorate) would belong to Iraq, that 10 percent of the royalties due to Iraq's government would be shared with Turkey for at least four years and as many as 25 (unless the remaining 21 years were sold to the United Kingdom for the agreed optional price of £500,000), and that all sides would accept the boundary line for the Iraq–Turkey border adopted on October 29, 1924.
- In China, the Kuomintang government named General Chiang Kai-shek as the commander-in-chief of China's National Revolutionary Army that would launch the Northern Expedition against the Beiyang Army that controlled Beijing in an effort to reunite the Republic of China.
- A fire at San Francisco's Ewing Field stadium, started accidentally by a spectator who dropped a lit cigarette burned down the wooden structure and then spread to adjacent buildings. At least 40 buildings and houses were destroyed or damaged as wind gusts spread burning embers over Saint Rose Street, Masonic Avenue, Broderick Street, O'Farrel Street, Sutter Street, Post Street and Scott Street The fire broke out during a game between two industrial teams, Union Oil Company at Anglo California Trust.
- Born:
  - Peter G. Peterson, American financier who served as the Chairman of the Council on Foreign Relations from 1985 to 2007, and U.S. Secretary of Commerce from 1972 to 1973, as well as having been the CEO of Bell & Howell, Lehman Brothers, and the Blackstone Group; as Peter Petropoulos in Kearney, Nebraska (d. 2018)
  - Morio Obata, Japanese mathematician known for the Lichnerowicz–Obata theorem; in Busan, Japanese-occupied Korea (d. 2006)

== June 6, 1926 (Sunday) ==
- In Australia, the Forrest River massacre of the indigenous Australians began as a police patrol, led by James St Jack and Denis Regan, arrived at Wodgil in the state of Western Australia, then kidnapped and murdered four men and three women. The four men were taken to Gotegotemerrie and killed, while the women were slain at Mowerie. The bodies of all seven were burned by the vigilantes, who were carrying out a punitive expedition for the May 23 killing of a white Australian, Frederick Hay.
- The silent comedy film Ella Cinders, based on a popular comic strip of the same name and starring Colleen Moore in the title role (based on the story of Cinderella), and Lloyd Hughes as "Waite Lifter" as the leading man, was released in the United States by First National Pictures. In 2013, the film would be selected for preservation in the National Film Registry by the Library of Congress as being "culturally, historically, or aesthetically significant".
- Spielvereinigung Greuther Fürth e. V. of Fürth won the championship tournament of soccer football in Germany, defeating Hertha BSC of Berlin, 4 to 1, before a crowd of 40,000 at Frankfurt.
- C.S. Marítimo of Funchal, on Portugal's Madeira Island, defeated C.F. Os Belenenses of Lisbon, 2 to 0, to win the Campeonato de Portugal, the championship tournament of soccer football of the Portuguese Football Federation.
- Born:
  - Klaus Tennstedt, German conductor; in Merseburg (d. 1998)
  - Erdal İnönü, Turkish politician who briefly served as Acting Prime Minister for six weeks in 1993; as the son of Prime Minister İsmet İnönü, in Ankara (d. 2007)
  - Patricia Peterson, American journalist who served as the fashion editor of The New York Times from 1957 to 1977; in Chicago (d. 2025)

== June 7, 1926 (Monday) ==
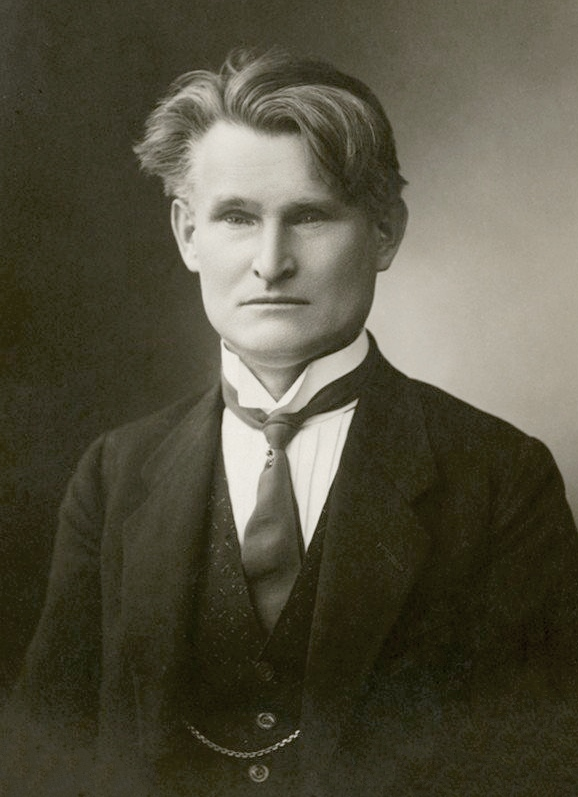
Grinius

- Kazys Grinius was elected President of Lithuania by the Baltic republic's parliament, the Seimas. Grinius received 50 of the 79 votes cast, while another 25 cards were left blank and three other candidates received one or two votes.
- Carl Gustaf Ekman formed a government as the new Prime Minister of Sweden, succeeding Rickard Sandler, whose government had resigned after receiving a vote of no confidence.
- Adly Yakan Pasha became the Prime Minister of Egypt, succeeding Ahmed Zeiwar Pasha, after being asked by King Fuad I to form a new government.
- The League of Nations opened its fortieth council session in Geneva. Brazil boycotted the session in protest of its being denied a seat on the permanent council.
- Born: Andrey Gaponov-Grekhov, Soviet Russian physicist; in Moscow (d. 2022)

== June 8, 1926 (Tuesday) ==
- Babe Ruth hit one of the longest home runs of his career at Navin Field in Detroit, over the right field stands and into the street a block away. Sportswriters at the game reported that the ball carried over 600 feet, although whether it actually did or not cannot be proven.
- Born: John Diebold, American businessman who specialized in the use of application of information technology to corporate business, and founder of the Diebold Group; in Weehawken, New Jersey (d. 2005)
- Died:
  - Emily Hobhouse, 66, British welfare campaigner known for exposing the conditions at British internment camps in South Africa during the Second Boer War
  - Saint Mariam Thresia Chiramel, 50, Roman Catholic nun who would be canonized in 2019, died from complications of diabetes and an infected injury to her leg.
  - Jurgis Dobkevičius, 26, Lithuanian aircraft designer and pilot who created the sports plane Dobi-I, the surveillance craft Dobi-II and the fighter Dobi-III, was killed on the second test flight of the Dobi-III.

== June 9, 1926 (Wednesday) ==
- Amanullah Khan Barakzai, the emir of the British protectorate of Afghanistan, declared the independence of the Asian emirate and founded the Kingdom of Afghanistan, with himself as the first monarch.
- Born:
  - Max Raab, American film producer and fashion marketer; in Philadelphia (d. 2008)
  - Dr. André Hellegers, Dutch-born American gynecologist and advocate on bioethics, founder of the Kennedy Institute of Ethics; in Venlo (died from a heart attack, 1979)
- Died:
  - Sanford B. Dole, 82, Hawaiian-born American businessman who led the overthrow of the Kingdom of Hawaii in 1894, declared a republic, and served as the first President of Hawaii (1894–1898), then later as its first territorial governor (1900–1903)
  - Wilford H. Smith, 62, African-American lawyer who became the first black attorney to win a case before the U.S. Supreme Court, with a victory in Carter v. Texas (177 U.S. 442 (1900)

== June 10, 1926 (Thursday) ==
- The "June Tenth Movement" began in Korea, at the time a colony of the Japanese Empire, to coincide with the elaborate funeral of the last Korean Emperor, Sunjong, who had died on April 26. During the funeral procession, students shouted for independence and handed out fliers to observers. Japanese police arrested 210 student protesters in Seoul, and 1,000 others in other Korean cities. All but 53 of the people rounded up were released without being tried or sentenced.
- At the League of Nations in Geneva, Brazil's Ambassador Afrânio de Melo Franco announced that the South American nation was withdrawing from the League Council, where it was one of the seven non-permanent members, after the Council had postponed additions to the four permanent members (the UK, France, Italy and Japan). At the same time, the League ambassador for Spain announced that his nation would withdraw if was not given a similar privilege. De Mello Franco said that withdrawal was limited ot the Council and not to the League Assembly, but hinted that complete departure would be next.
- The Treaty of Friendship between France and Romania was signed in Paris. Although a diplomatic victory for Romanian Prime Minister Alexandru Averescu, it had little actual value since it did not commit France to lend direct military assistance in the event of war between Romania and the Soviet Union.
- The Egyptian news and political magazine Al-Fath published its first issue, and would continue for 22 years.
- Born:
  - Lionel Jeffries, British actor, director and screenwriter; in Forest Hill, London (d. 2010)
  - Asrul Sani, Indonesian screenwriter; in Rao, West Sumatra, Dutch East Indies (now Indonesia)
- Died: Antoni Gaudí, 73, Catalonian architect

== June 11, 1926 (Friday) ==
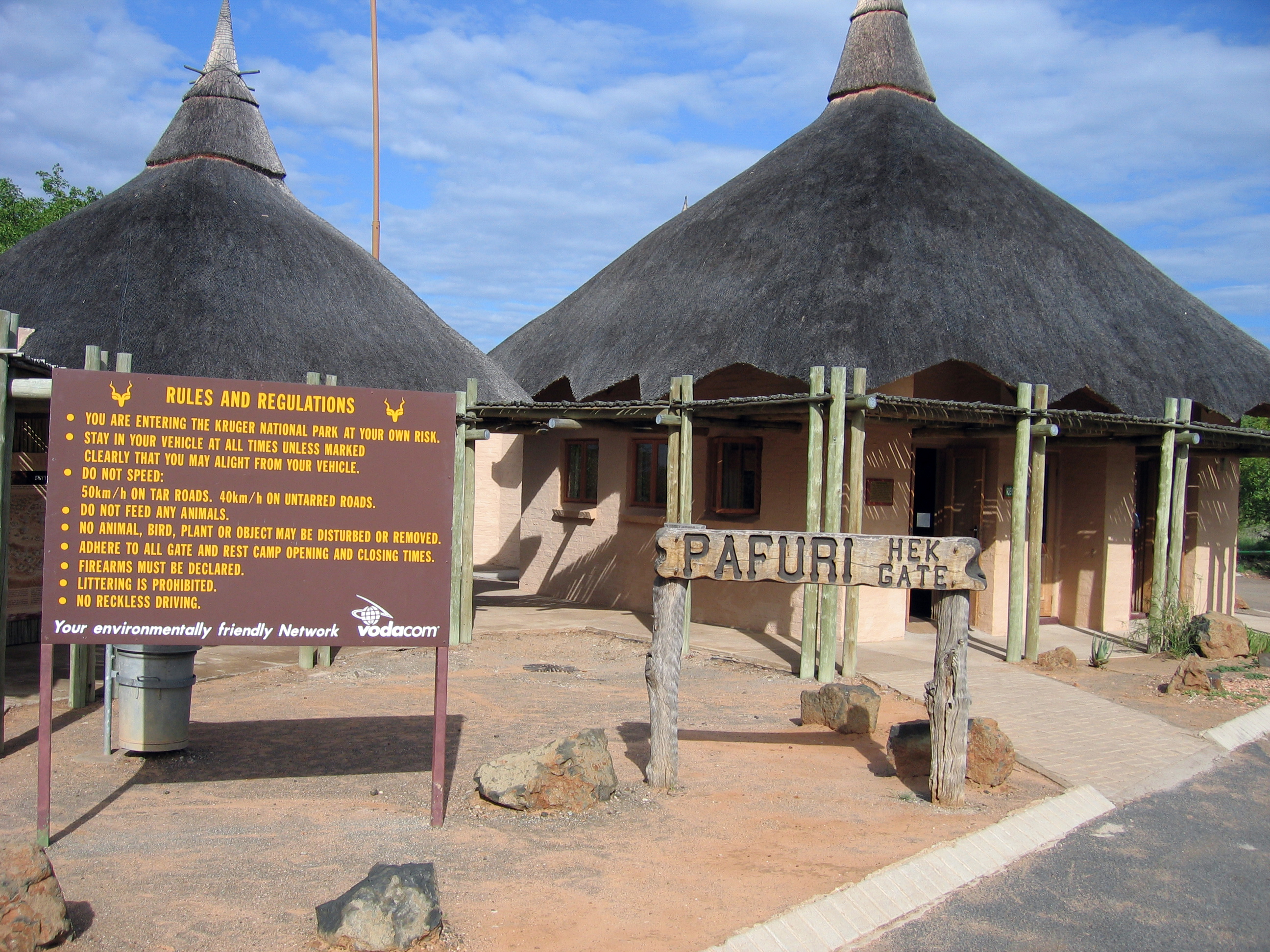
The Kruger National Park

- The National Parks Act of 1926 was enacted in South Africa, clearing the way for the national government's creation of the Kruger National Park.

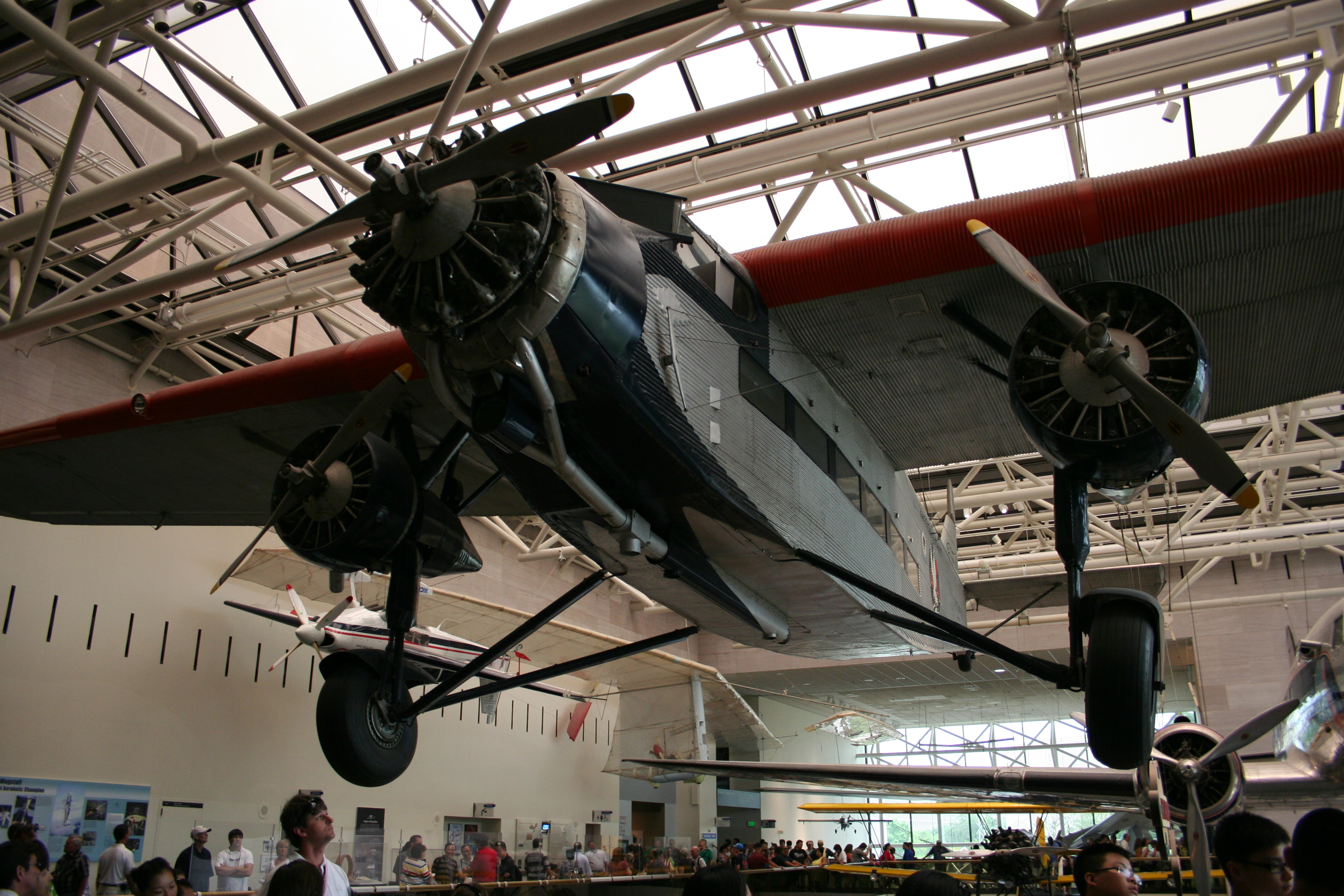
The Tri-Motor

- The Ford Trimotor transport airplane, with three engines for additional power, made its first flight. Designed by William Bushnell Stout, the 4-AT Trimotor was made from a Stout Metal Airplane Company single-engine monoplane modified for three Curtis-Wright air-cooled engines.
- Born:
  - Carlisle Floyd, American operatic composer known for the 1955 opera Susannah; in Latta, South Carolina (d. 2021)
  - Frank Plicka, Czech photographer, in Kladno, Czechoslovakia (d. 2010)

== June 12, 1926 (Saturday) ==
- Lithuania's first radio station, Kauno radijo stotis (literally "Kaunas Radio Station") began broadcasting from its location in the Lithuanian capital, and marking the first time that the Lithuanian language could be heard on a radio.
- The 1926 Ashes series, the annual Test cricket competition between the national teams of England and Australia, opened with a three-day event at Trent Bridge cricket ground in West Bridgford, Nottinghamshire, and the two teams played to a draw. Three more tests would end in a draw in June and July until England's win in the fifth test on August 18.
- A monument to the actress Sarah Bernhardt by the sculptor François-Léon Sicard was unveiled in Paris near the house where she died in 1923.

== June 13, 1926 (Sunday) ==
- The popular Ben Travers play Rookery Nook, third of the 12 Aldwych farce comedies, made his debut at the Aldwych Theatre in London for the first of 403 performances.
- Born:

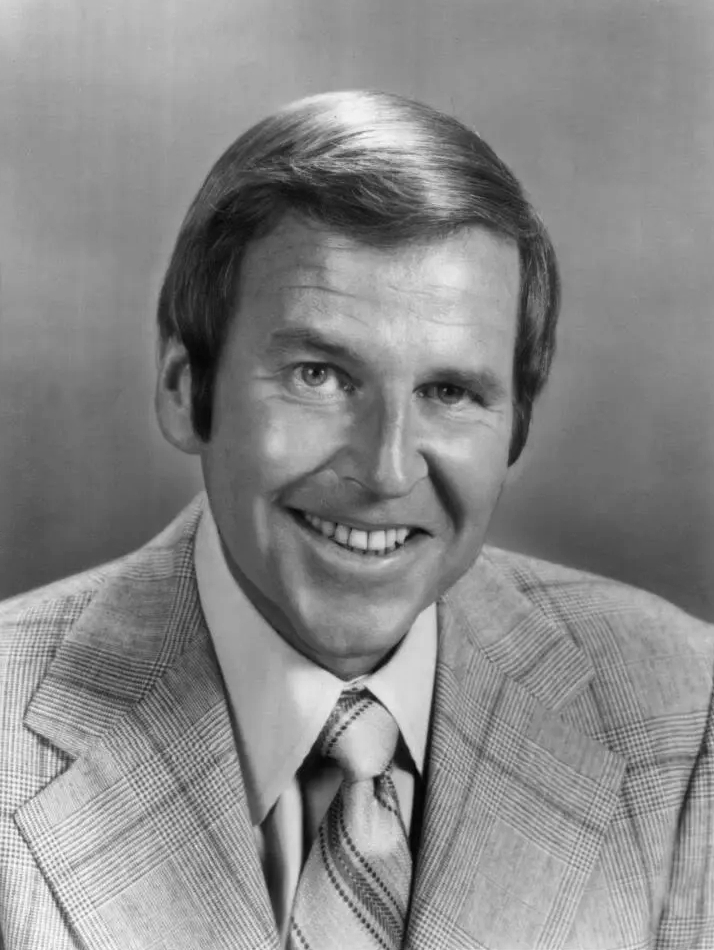
Lynde

  - Paul Lynde, American comedian and character actor on television, stage and film; in Mount Vernon, Ohio (d. 1982)
  - Kanam E. J. (pen name for Philip Elavunkal Joseph), Indian novelist and screenwriter in the Malayalam language, known for the novel Bharya; Kanam, Kingdom of Travancore, British India (now in the Karala state)(d. 1987)
- Died:
  - Nikolay Chkheidze, Georgian politician who served as head of state of the Transcaucasian Democratic Federative Republic in 1918 and the Democratic Republic of Georgia from 1918 to 1921, committed suicide in Paris, where he had lived after fleeing the Soviet Union.
  - Gottfried Lindauer, 87, Bohemian-born New Zealand painter

== June 14, 1926 (Monday) ==
- The Calles Law, amending Mexico's Penal Code for crimes "concerning religious worship and external discipline" was enacted at the direction of President Plutarco Elías Calles to enforce constitutional restrictions against the Catholic Church, and to punish lawbreakers in the clergy. Effective July 31, punishments would range from fines for wearing clerical clothing in public, to imprisonment for criticism of the government by a priest or other member of the clergy.
- Brazil became the second country to announce its withdrawal from the League of Nations, with the departure confirmed by a cable by Foreign Minister Félix Pacheco from Rio de Janeiro to the League Council in Geneva."Although she has resigned," the Associated Press report noted, Brazil remains a member by virtue of the covenant, for two years from the time the passage was sent. It is dated Saturday, June 12, 11:35 p.m." Brazil's withdrawal, and the 1924 resignation by Costa Rica, lowered the number of League member nations from 55 to 53.
- The İzmir plot, a plan to assassinate President Mustafa Kemal Atatürk during his visit to the Kemeraltı district of the city of İzmir, was foiled. Under the plan, plotted by Ziya Hurşit, Kemal's car would have been attacked as it passed in front of the Gaffarzade Hotel, with Hursit firing gunshots and Gurcu Yusuf and Laz Ismail throwing bombs. The Governor of İzmir, Kâzım Dirik, was tipped off to the plans by one of the plotters, Giriti Sevki. Dirik then sent a telegram to President Kemal, who postponed the trip and ordered the arrest of all parliament members from the banned Progressive Republican Party (Teraḳḳîperver Cumhûriyet Fırḳası). Historians Erik-Jan Zürcher and Raymond Kévorkian would state in 2013 that there had never been a plot to assassinate Kemal and the prosecution was a show trial intended to eliminate his political opponents.
- About 50 demonstrators from the Social Democratic Party of Germany were injured, and 100 arrested as Berlin police held broke up a protest outside of the City Palace, after police tried to confiscate an effigy of the former Kaiser, Wilhelm II.
- Born:
  - Don Newcombe, American baseball pitcher, known for being the 1948 National League (NL) Rookie of the Year, the 1956 NL MVP and Cy Young Award winner, and for playing in three professional leagues, the Negro National League (for the Newark Eagles), the NL (for the Brooklyn Dodgers) and Japan's Central League (for the Chunichi Dragons); in Madison, New Jersey (d. 2019)
  - Ivan Moscovich, Yugoslav-born Hungarian inventor and designer of puzzles, games and toys; in Novi Sad (d. 2023)
  - Hermann Kant, German novelist and informer for East Germany's Stasi; in Hamburg (d. 2016)
- Died: Mary Cassatt, 82, American impressionist painter

== June 15, 1926 (Tuesday) ==
- The World Court opened its eleventh session at The Hague.
- The British ballet A Tragedy of Fashion was first performed, launching the debut of the Ballet Rambert of Dame Marie Rambert, and of choreographer and Rambert's co-star, Frederick Ashton.
- Born:
  - François Michelin, Chief Executive Officer of the Michelin tire manufacturing company from 1955 to 1999; in Clermont-Ferrand, Puy-de-Dôme département (d. 2015)
  - Shigeru Kayano, Japanese Ainu activist and politician who became, in 1994, the first Ainu member of the Japanese parliament; in Nibutani, Biratori, Hokkaido (d. 2006)
  - Carol Fox, American opera impresario who co-founded the Lyric Opera of Chicago in 1954; in Chicago (d. 1981)

== June 16, 1926 (Wednesday) ==
- Aurelio Padovani, an early Fascist leader who had fallen out of favour with Mussolini, was killed along with eight other people when the fourth floor balcony of Padovani's home in Naples collapsed as he stepped out to greet a throng of admirers below.
- Abdulrahman bin Muhammad Al Shamsi, the father-in-law of the Sultan bin Saqr Al Qasimi II, Emir of Sharjah (now part of the United Arab Emirates), voluntarily surrendered to British colonial authorities to begin a four-year exile in Aden after having been accused, on little evidence, of murdering a local official.
- Ziya Hurşit, former deputy in the Grand National Assembly of Turkey, was arrested for plotting to assassinate President Mustafa Kemal Atatürk. He and 14 other accused conspirators were executed on July 14 for their roles in the conspiracy.
- Born:
  - General Efraín Ríos Montt, President of Guatemala from 1982 to 1983; in Huehuetenango (d. 2018)
  - William F. Roemer, Jr., American FBI agent known for being the most highly decorated agent in the bureau's history, and for his battle against organized crime; in South Bend, Indiana (d. 1996)
  - Charles Assemekang, Foreign Minister of the Republic of the Congo to 1970, and former president of Congo Supreme Court, known for being expelled from politics on accusations of "occult practices"; in Souanké, French Congo (d. 1999)

== June 17, 1926 (Thursday) ==
- Admiral José Mendes Cabeçadas of the Portuguese Navy was forced by leaders of the May coup d'état to resign from his positions as both President of Portugal and Prime Minister after having been installed on May 31. At a meeting of the revolutionary council at Sacavém, General Manuel Gomes da Costa, who had led the coup on May 28, concluded along with other members that Mendes Cabecadas was incapable of leadership, and Gomes da Costa assumed both posts.
- A train crash near Blairsville, Pennsylvania killed 15 people and injured more than 50 others when Pennsylvania Railroad's Train No. 40 (the Chicago-Cincinnati-Pittsburgh Limited) ran past several signal flares and slammed into the back of the stalled Pittsburgh-Washington Express Train No. 50 and smashed four of its passenger cars.
- The Seventh Street Bridge (now the Andy Warhol Bridge) opened in Pittsburgh. The bridge would be renamed in honor of Pittsburgh native and artist Andy Warhol in 2005.
- Born: Werner Kaegi, Swiss composer and computer scientist known for developing programming for computer-generated music; in Uznach (d. 2024)

== June 18, 1926 (Friday) ==
- At Mecca, soldiers of the Egyptian Army fired into a crowd of Muslims Najdis and killed 25 of them, after a protest began when the Egyptians were playing music while carrying the Mahmal through the holy city of Mecca during the Hajj pilgrimage. The Najdis, conservative Muslims and adherents of the Salafi movement, considered the playing of music while pilgrims were walking to the Kaaba shrine to be an affront to Muslim principles.
- Australia passed amendments to the 1904 Conciliation and Arbitration Act, granting wider powers to judges to resolve labor disputes.
- The Fédération Internationale de Philatélie (FIP), the oldest world federation for stamp collecting and other branches of philately, was founded in at Castagnola in Switzerland by the representatives of several philately federations in other nations.
- Born:
  - Allan Sandage, American astronomer known for determining the first reasonably accurate values for the Hubble constant and the age of the universe., in Iowa City, Iowa (d. 2010)
  - Murray A. Straus, 89, American sociologist known for creating, in 1979, the controversial conflict tactics scale; in New York City (d. 2016)
  - Avshalom Haviv, Palestinian Zionist and terrorist member of the Irgun; in Haifa, Mandatory Palestine (executed 1947)
- Died:
  - George N. Best, 79, American botanist and bryologist (an expert on the various species of moss) for whom the genus Bestia is named.
  - Olga Constantinovna of Russia, 74, Russian princess and former Queen Consort of Greece from 1867 to 1913 as the wife of King Geórgios I, and briefly the regent for one month in 1920, died in exile in Rome

== June 19, 1926 (Saturday) ==
- Pope Pius XI promulgated the papal instruction Cadaverum cremationis, affirming the Roman Catholic Church's ban on cremation, a prohibition that would remain in as Catholic doctrine until it was relaxed by Pope Paul VI on June 5, 1964.
- DeFord Bailey became the first African-American to be listed in newspaper radio schedules as a performer on the WSM Barn Dance (which would be renamed The Grand Ole Opry show on December 10, 1927), from the studio of the Nashville radio station WSM. As authors note in a biography of Bailey, "he had probably begun regular appearances before then.
- Ballet Mécanique, a ballet composed by George Antheil, was given its first performance, debuting in Paris. Combining classical music with the sounds of machinery (including factory whistles, elevated trains, canning machinery, and airplanes), but no dancers, the ballet was not received well and its American premiere at Carnegie Hall was booed by the crowd. The ballet would not perform again for more than 60 years.
- The Polish language opera Król Roger ("King Roger"), by Karol Szymanowski to a Polish libretto by the composer himself and Jarosław Iwaszkiewicz, made its debut, at the Grand Theatre, Warsaw. The opera was based on the rule of the 12th century King Roger II of Sicily.
- Born:
  - Erna Schneider Hoover, American mathematician and inventor att Bell Laboratories, known for her 1954 invention of stored program control, a computerized telephone switching method; in Irvington, New Jersey (alive in 2026)
  - William Toye, Canadian author and editor; in Toronto (d. 2024)
  - Josef Nesvadba, Czech science fiction writer and the first Eastern European sci-fi author to have his work translated into English; in Prague, Czechoslovakia (d. 2005)

== June 20, 1926 (Sunday) ==
- The German referendum to expropriate the property of the princes of the former ruling houses of the monarchy received a 96.1% vote of endorsement (with more than 14 million in favor and less than 600,000 against). However, the Weimar Republic constitution had a requirement that at least 50 percent of nearly 40 million registered voters needed to participate for the referendum results to be effective, and less than 16 million voted, a turnout of only 39 percent. In that the opponents predicted that the vote would be in favor of expropriation, the opposition encouraged its people not to vote at all so that the overall turnout would be less than half of the eligible voters.
- The biennial 28th International Eucharistic Congress of the Roman Catholic Church, the first Congress to be assembled in the United States, opened at Soldier Field in Chicago for a four-day session, with over 250,000 spectators watching the opening procession that included 10 cardinals, 60 archbishops and 300 bishops, and one million people going receiving communion.
- Three memorial services were held for Christian evangelist Aimee Semple McPherson, missing since May 18, to accommodate the 17,000 people who wished to pay their final respects along with millions of listeners who tuned in to the services on the radio.
- Jimmy Boyle, a catcher for major league baseball's New York Giants, set an unusual record in the only professional game of his career by playing only one inning, the 9th inning of a game of an 8 to 0 loss to the Pittsburgh Pirates.
- Born:
  - Israeli Army General Rehavam Ze'evi, right-wing politician who founded the Moledet party and advocated deportation of Israel's Palestinian people; in Jerusalem (assassinated 2001)
  - Isaura Borges Coelho, Portuguese rights activist, nurse, and political prisoner of the Estado Novo dictatorship; in Portimão (d. 2019)
- Died:
  - Kate Jordan, 63, Irish-born American novelist and playwright, committed suicide by drinking Lysol.
  - Thomas Cullen, 35, Irish independence activist and intelligence agent for the Irish Republican Army Organisation, drowned accidentally while swimming in Lough Dan in County Wicklow.
  - Alfred Hollingsworth, 51, American stage and silent film actor

== June 21, 1926 (Monday) ==
- The world's largest children's choir, composed of 60,000 children from 325 of the Chicago archdiocese Roman Catholic parochial schools, performed for "Children's Day" at the International Eucharistic Congress hosted by Chicago, performing De Angelis and Panis Anggelicus for tens of thousands of spectators at Soldier Field and more than 100,000 more listeners who could hear the proceedings on loudspeakers outside the stadium.
- U.S. President Calvin Coolidge announced a government surplus of $390 million for the fiscal year ending June 30.
- Days after stating in print that he would avenge the May 25 assassination of Simon Petlura, General Volodymyr Oskilko, who had attempted a coup d'état against the government of the Ukrainian National Republic, was assassinated in Poland at his home in Równe (now Rivne in Ukraine).
- Born:
  - Lou Ottens, Dutch engineer and inventor of the cassette tape; in Bellingwolde (d. 2021)
  - Conrad Hall, French Polynesian-born American cinematographer and winner of three Academy Awards; in Papeete, Tahiti (d. 2003)
  - Margaret Potter, British novelist known best for the romantic novel The Truth Game; in Harrow, Middlesex (d. 1998)
  - Luis Alberto del Paraná, popular Paraguayan singer and guitarist, leader of the Los Paraguayos band; in Altos (d. 1974 from a stroke).

== June 22, 1926 (Tuesday) ==
- In Beijing, Yan Huiqing resigned as President and Prime Minister of the Republic of China after only 40 days in office, and was replaced by Du Xigui who served as the acting president and premier until October.
- An attempt by the U.S. Navy to raise the wreckage of the submarine USS S-51 failed. After a collision with a steamship on September 25, S-21 had sunk in the ocean off of the coast of Block Island near the U.S. state of Rhode Island. Three of the 36 crew survived after escaping, and the bodies of eight more were found, but S-21 became a tomb for the other 25 crew. The U.S. Navy destroyer minesweeper USS Falcon brought up the craft, which entombed the bodies of 25 of the 33 men killed. In heavy waves, the vessel broke loose of the salvaging lines. The submarine would finally be raised on July 5.
- The William Watson overture Portsmouth Point was given its first performance, debuting in Zurich in Switzerland, followed six days later by a performance in London.
- Born:
  - George Englund, American film director known for The Ugly American; as George Howe Ripley in Washington, D.C. (d. 2017)
  - Arthur H. Rosenfeld, American physicist and energy efficiency expert; in Birmingham, Alabama (d. 2017)
  - Doreen Mantle, South African-born British TV actress, best known for the BBC One situation comedy One Foot in the Grave; in Johannesburg (d. 2023)

== June 23, 1926 (Wednesday) ==
a sample SAT question

- What is now known as the SAT— originally the Scholastic Aptitude Test— was administered to college and university applicants for the first time, with 8,040 students sitting for a standardized examination of their verbal and mathematical skills at more than 300 testing centers. The SAT had been prepared by a committee organized by the College Entrance Examination Board and headed by Princeton University psychologist Carl Brigham, with 315 questions that the students had 97 minutes to answer.

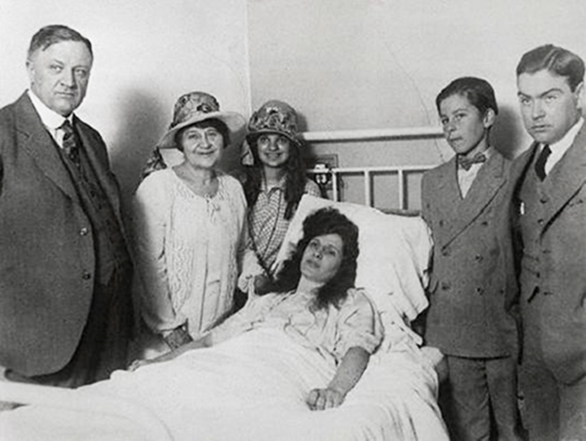
McPherson after her ordeal

- At least 80 people were killed and thousands were left homeless by a flash flood and a dam break in the Mexican state of Guanajuato that struck the city of León de Los Aldama. The Los Gomez river began overflowing its banks in the morning, and its El Muerto tributary washed through the village of El Coecilo. At 9:00 in the morning, the dam at Hacienda de Arriba collapsed, raising the flood level higher. By June 25, hundreds of people were reported dead from the flooding as irrigation dams broke overnight.
- U.S. evangelist Aimee Semple McPherson, who had disappeared on May 18, was found stumbling in the desert of Agua Prieta in Mexico, south of the border shared with Douglas, Arizona. McPherson, who had last been seen in public at a beach in Ocean Park, California, and was feared at the time to have been drowned in the ocean, claimed that she had been kidnapped, drugged, tortured and held for ransom, but had escaped from a shack while her captors were away. Her account immediately came under suspicion from California prosecutors, who convened three grand jury investigations and even brought an indictment for criminal conspiracy for perjury and obstruction of justice, though the charges were ultimately dismissed before a scheduled trial.
- In the Kingdom of Spain, the "Sanjuanada", a plot to overthrow the government of the nation's Prime Minister and dictator, Miguel Primo de Rivera was foiled one day before it was to take place on June 24. The organizers, Colonel Segundo García and Army Captain Fermín Galán, was arrested along with several other officers and imprisoned at the Montjuïc Castle in Barcelona.
- France's Prime Minister Aristide Briand reorganized his cabinet to form his new government, with the Ministers of War and of Finance being replaced. Adolphe Guillaumat succeeded War Minister Paul Painlevé, and Joseph Caillaux took over from Finance Minister Raoul Péret.
- Lightning storms and flooding in northern and central Germany killed 10 people, including seven soldiers on maneuvers near Neusalz-on-Oder (now Nowa Sól in Poland), after they had taken shelter in the field radio station. According to The New York Times, "lightning struck the antennae pole, entered the station and electrocuted every man in the room. Their bodies were blackened and twisted into gnome-like masses from the heat and high voltage of the flash."
- Died: Jón Magnússon, 67, Prime Minister of Iceland since 1922

== June 24, 1926 (Thursday) ==
- U.S. President Calvin Coolidge signed the Naval Aircraft Expansion bill into law, creating the position of Assistant Secretary of the Navy for Aeronautics to oversee the United States' naval aviation forces. The navy's five-year plan for aviation was also passed.
- An attempt to extend the 1922 Washington Naval Treaty, the international agreement to put limitations on the building of additional warships, failed in Geneva when the nations of the Naval Subcommittee of the Preparatory Disarmament Commission rejected a proposal to base the limits on the tonnage of ships by classes. While the representatives of six nations (the U.S., the UK, Japan, Spain, Argentina and Chile) voted in favor, another 12, led by France and Italy, voted against and five abstained.

== June 25, 1926 (Friday) ==
- Amateur golfer Bobby Jones won British Open at Royal Lytham & St Annes Golf Club in Lytham St Annes at Lancashire in England, marking the first time in the 20th century that a non-professional had won the event. Jones finished two strokes ahead of his fellow American, Al Watrous, 291 to 293. Because he was an amateur, Jones was unable to receive the £75 prize, which went instead to Watrous, who had been leading, 215–217 at noon. The second-place finish was the highest for Watrous, who would never win a major championship during his career.
- Freddie Spruell became the first Delta blues musician to be recorded, when he cut "Milk Cow Blues" in Chicago.
- Born: Ingeborg Bachmann, Austrian poet and author, in Klagenfurt (d. 1973)

== June 26, 1926 (Saturday) ==
- France's new Minister of Finance, Joseph Caillaux, ousted the Governor of the Banque de France, Georges Robineau, and replaced him with Émile Moreau. Robineau had refused to allow France's gold reserves to be used to help stop the devaluation of the franc.
- A powerful earthquake struck the Greek island of Rhodes and destroyed nearly all of the buildings in the village of Arkhangelos. Because most people fled into the streets after the foreshock at 5:43 in the morning, only one death was reported.
- William Lyon Mackenzie King, Prime Minister of Canada, lost on a motion in the House of Commons to strike a recommendation of censure of his government for maladministration, failing by a vote of 115 to 117. A motion to halt debating and to adjourn parliament failed, 114 to 115 and the session continued until 5:20 the next morning, when adjournment was approved, 115 to 114.
- Leoš Janáček's composition Sinfonietta was given its first performance, with Václav Talich conducting the Czechoslovak Symphony Orchestra in Prague.
- Born:
  - Gianni Benvenuti, Italian artist, children's book illustrator and sculptor; in Pisa (d. 2005)
  - Antonio Oteiza, Spanish artist, sculptor and Order of Friars Minor Capuchin brother; in San Sebastián (d. 2025)
  - Sandra Payson, American arts patron, socialite
  - A. H. M. Qamaruzzaman, Bangladesh politician who served as president of the Awami League political party from 1974 to 1975, and as the nation's Minister of Industries; in Natore, Bengal Presidency, British India (now Bangladesh)
- Died: Nelson Illingworth, 63, English-born Australian sculptor known for his busts of Sir Edmund Barton and Sir Henry Parkes of Australia and former New Zealand prime minister R. J. Seddon

== June 27, 1926 (Sunday) ==
- Elections for the Majlis, the unicameral Parliament of Persia, were held with multiple candidates for the 136 district seats. Prior to the voting, the monarch, Reza Shah, had banned political parties and removed parliamentary immunity as a means of preventing opposition.
- The 1926 French Grand Prix took place with only three drivers participating out of 12 entrants. Because of recent changes in the regulations of the international Commission Sportive Internationale for automobiles used in Grand Prix races, nine of the 12 entrants had race cars (the Talbot 700, SIMA-Violet, Delage 15S8 that did not qualify. Only the three drivers who used the Bugatti 39A — Jules Goux of France, Meo Costantini of Italy and Pierre de Vizcaya of Spain— competed, and Goux was the only one to finish the 100-lap race.
- The films Miss Nobody and The Gentle Cyclone opened.
- Born:
  - Wilma Schmidt, Germanoperati soprano for the Staatsoper Hannover opera; (d. 2022)
  - Don Raleigh, Canadian NHL ice hockey player; in Kenora, Ontario (d. 2012)

== June 28, 1926 (Monday) ==
- William Lyon Mackenzie King, the Prime Minister of Canada, resigned after the Governor General, Julian Byng invoked his reserve power to refuse to sign the formal Order in Council to dissolve Parliament. King told the Canadian House of Commons, "I have a very important announcement which I wish to make to the House before proceeding any further. The public interests demand a dissolution of the House of Commons. As Prime Minister I so advised His Excellency, the Governor-General, shortly after noon today. His Excellency having declined to accept my advice to grant a dissolution, to which I believe under British practice I was entitled, I immediately tendered my resignation, which His Excellency has been graciously pleased to accept." Viscount Byng then summoned the conservative leader of the opposition, Arthur Meighen, to form a new government while parliament continued to operate.
- At 10:23 in the morning local time (0323 UTC), a 6.7 magnitude earthquake struck West Sumatra in what is now Indonesia, and killed 354 people. A second quake, at 6.4 magnitude, happened at 1:15 in the afternoon and, with other aftershocks, killed an additional 57 people.
- French police thwarted a plot to assassinate King Alfonso XIII of Spain, who was visiting France to watch the French Grand Prix.
- The first of two mass murders, resulting in ten deaths in Tampa, Florida, attributed to Benjamin Franklin Levins, was discovered when four bodies were discovered at a house on South Nebraska Avenue. Another six people were found murdered on May 27, 1927, in a crime for which Levins would be arrested. Levins would be executed in the Florida State Penitentiary electric chair on November 22, 1927.
- Born: Mel Brooks (stage name for Melvin James Kaminsky), American comedian and filmmaker; in the Brownsville section of Brooklyn, New York (alive in 2026)

== June 29, 1926 (Tuesday) ==
- By decree of the government of Benito Mussolini, the Kingdom of Italy increased the working day from eight hours to nine hours as part of a nationwide efficiency drive. In addition to the workday extension, the austerity measures included a ban on construction of "luxurious buildings", restriction of all daily newspapers to six pages, selling of food by employers to employees to be at cost, barring of the opening of new taverns, dance halls, cabarets. pastry shops or other "de luxe amusements"; and, effective November 1, blending gasoline with alcohol "obtained from wine which is not consumable or exportable."
- Arthur Meighen of the Conservative Party became the Prime Minister of Canada for the second time.
- U.S. President Calvin Coolidge established the Johnston Island Reservation for the "refuge and breeding for native birds" at the Johnston Atoll in the South Pacific Ocean, by Executive Order 4467.
- Ratifications of the German–Soviet Neutrality and Nonaggression Pact, signed on April 24, were exchanged at Berlin between the German Foreign Ministry and the Soviet Embassy, with the five-year pact to go into effect immediately. After another extension in 1931, the treaty would expire in 1936 and the two nations would go to war in 1941.
- Born:
  - Jaber Al-Ahmad Al-Sabah, Emir of Kuwait from 1977 to 2006; in Kuwait City (d. 2006)
  - Lieutenant General Julius W. Becton Jr., U.S. Army officer who served as the director of the Federal Emergency Management Agency from 1985 to 1989; in Bryn Mawr, Pennsylvania (d. 2023)

== June 30, 1926 (Wednesday) ==
- Oltre Giuba, formerly a British administered protectorate as part of British East Africa, was formally incorporated under Italy's control as the most southern province of its colony of Italian Somaliland.
- At a meeting of club owners within the Real Federación Española de Fútbol (RFEF), professional fútbol (soccer football) was approved in Spain, permitting member clubs to create regional professional leagues and setting the way for the foundation of La Liga, the Spanish national league, in 1929.
- Robert Forke resigned as the leader of the Progressive Party of Canada, the Dominion's third largest party after the Liberals and Conservatives, with 22 seats in the House of Commons. Forke's resignation came after a split in the party between liberals and conservatives within the party.
- The Reichspropagandaleitung, Nazi Germany's central propaganda office, was established initially as a branch of the Nazi Party, and would later be responsible for the oversight of news and other information during the existence of Nazi Germany. While Gregor Strasser was the initial director (Reichspropagandaleiter), Joseph Goebbels would serve as Propaganda Minister for the entire existence of Nazi Germany.
- English pilot Alan Cobham took off from the River Medway to begin a round-trip survey flight from England to Australia in his de Havilland seaplane.
- Born:
  - Paul Berg, American chemist and Nobel Prize in Chemistry laureate; in Brooklyn, New York (d. 2023)
  - Richard Gorlin, American cardiologist and co-inventor of the Gorlin equation to measure the area of the heart valve in aortic valve stenosis and mitral valve stenosis; in Jersey City, New Jersey (d. 1997)
- Died: Lionel Royer, 73, French mural painter best known for his large scenes of the life of Joan of Arc in the Basilica of Bois-Chenu in Domrémy, Vosges département
