= Jimoh Oyewumi, Ajagungbade III =

Soun of Ogbomosho (1926–2021)

Jimoh Oladunni Oyewumi, Ajagungbade III
- Ṣọ̀ún of Ògbómọ̀ṣọ́

Soun of Ogbomoso
- Reign: 24 October 1973 – 12 December 2021
- Coronation: 14 December 1973
- Predecessor: Salami Ajiboye Itabiyi
- Successor: Ghandi Afolabi Olaoye, Orumogege III
- Born: Jimoh Oladunni Oyewumi; 27 May 1926; Ogbomosho, Nigeria
- Died: 12 December 2021 (aged 95); Nigeria
- Spouse: Ayaba Olaronke Oyewumi
Names
- Jímọ̀h Ọládùnní Oyèwùmí
Regnal name
- Ajágungbádé III
- House: Oluwusi
- Father: Oba Bello Afolabi Oyewumi Ajagungbade II
- Mother: Ayaba Seliat Olatundun Oyewumi

Ọba Jimoh Oladunni Oyewumi, Ajagungbade III (Yoruba: Jímọ̀ Ọládùnní Oyèwùmí; 27 May 1926 – 12 December 2021) was the Soun of Ogbomosho, or traditional ruler (Ọba), of the Yoruba town of Ogbomosho, for 48 years, until his death in 2021.

== Early life and ancestry ==
Oba Jimoh Oladunni Oyewumi, Ajagungbade III, he was born on 27 May 1926 into the Royal House of Oluwusi in Ogbomosho to the reigning king, Oba Bello Afolabi Oyewumi, Ajagungbade I, and one of his queens, Seliat Olatundun Oyewumi. His father had many wives and 63 children: 31 daughters and 32 sons. He was the youngest of his mother's three sons. He was born in the tenth year of his father's reign.

His paternal grandfather was Oba Gbagungboye Ajamasa, Ajagungbade I, who reigned from 1869 to 1871 (or 1870 to 1877). His great-grandfather was Oluwusi Aremu who reigned from 1826 to 1840. Oluwusi was a half brother of Toye Akanni Alebiosu of Ogbomoso, the 7th Aare Ona Kakanfo of the Oyo Empire and also a Soun of Ogbomoso.

Oluwusi's father was Ikumoyede Ajo, the latest Soun's great-great grandfather, who ruled Ogbomoso from 1770 to 1790. Ikumoyede's father, Oba Ajagungbade III's great-great-great grandfather, was Erinsbaba Alamu Jogioro, who was the second Soun of Ogbomoso, and regarded as a strong and brave warrior. He ruled from 1741 to 1770. Jogioro's father was the first Soun of Ogbomoso, Olabanjo Ogunlola Ogundiran, who founded the town of Ogbomoso in the mid 17th century. Thus, Oba Ajagungbade III, in a direct male descent is the great-great-great-great grandson of Soun Ogunlola.

The Royal House of Oluwusi is one of the 5 royal houses of Ogbomosho, each of them descended from the five sons of Ikumoyede (Toyeje, Oluwusi, Jaiyeola Baiyewuwon Kelebe, Bolanta Adigun, and Ogunlabi Odunaro).

== Education and life before reign ==
Oyewumi's father died on 18 February 1940, when he was 13 years old. After the death of his father, he was forced to stop his schooling at St. Patrick Catholic School, Oke-Padre in Ibadan, and return to Ogbomoso, where he stayed with his mother during the royal funeral. He then attended the Ogbomoso People's Institute, in Paku, Ogbomoso to continue his elementary education, though he was soon forced to withdraw, and where he learned cloth waving from one of his brothers in the city of Ilesa, where he weaved and sold aso ofi. He then travelled to the northern city of Jos, Nigeria, on 17 May 1944, where he started a business selling imported goods and beer from the United Kingdom. His ability to speak English earned him many business opportunities and open doors to his business with Europeans. He then founded J.O.Oyewumi and Company (Nigeria) Limited, a hotel business chain. He returned from Jos to Ogbomosho in 1973 to put his name forward as a contestant to the throne of the Soun after the death of Oba Olajide Olayode II.

== Reign ==
As in many Yoruba towns, the monarch is elected by a group of chiefs known as the Afọbajẹ (kingmakers, literally meaning "One who enthrones a monarch). Many Ogbomosho princes put their names into consideration, and through several rituals including via invoking Ifá, and an official vote, (in which he got 92 votes out of 94), Ọba Oyewumi was selected as the 20th Ṣọún of Ògbómọ̀ṣọ́. Oyewumi succeeded his third cousin, Oba Salami Ajiboye Itabiyi on October 24, 1973, and took the royal name Ajagungbade (Ajágungbádé) III, used by both his father and grandfather, meaning "One who fights a war to receive the crown." He was the first Soun of Ogbomoso to wear a beaded crown, which sparked controversy, as the beaded crowns are often only worn by high ranking kings, and as Ogbomoso was often a town within the vicinity and control of the Oyo Empire, the Soun was not a major monarch. During his reign, he built a modern palace and facilitated the development of Ogbomoso into a more industrious town. He was the longest serving Soun in history.

== Personal life ==
Oyewumi was a polygamist and married several wives. He married his first wife Ayaba Igbayilola Oyewumi (now deceased), in 1950. Among his other wives include Ayaba Olaronke Oyewumi (b. 1949). He had 24 children and many grandchildren and great-grandchildren. Kunle Oyewumi is his 21st son. One of his daughters is the notable Nigerian gender scholar Oyeronke Oyewumi. He was a Muslim, though several of his wives and children are Christians.

He gave up the ghost on 12 December 2021, at the age of 95.
