= Frank Plicka =

Australian street photographer

Frank Plicka (11 June 1926 – 9 December 2010 in Sydney, Australia) was a Czech-born Australian photographer best known for his book Streets of Sydney, a tour of Sydney documented in black and white photographs taken over a period of 30 years. The images depict life in and around Sydney streets, pubs, bars, galleries and beaches.

== Biography ==
Plicka was born in 1926 in the mining town of Kladno, former Czechoslovakia. His father was a miner who struggled to provide for his family.

After completing elementary school with high marks, he enrolled in an elite gymnasium in 1937. After World War II, he continued his studies at Charles University of Prague and graduated with a degree in education. Until 1968, he was involved in sports professionally, coaching top Czech swimmers. In 1967, he was awarded the title of Coach of the Year.

In 1968, after the Warsaw Pact invasion of Czechoslovakia, he fled to Australia. He settled in Sydney and became interested in street photography.

Besides Australia, he spent a year photographing in Africa (1970s) and three years in Asia (1980s). He held several exhibitions in Sydney and completed three books, although only his book on Sydney was published.

== Work ==
Cover of Plicka's first and only published book, Streets of Sydney

From early age, Plicka was involved in sports and his desire to catch all moments led him to sports photography. As a sports photographer, he photographed in six European countries, including Russia.

His trademark is candid black-and-white photography. He has been using different cameras during 65 years of work, but since 1952, he has been using Leica cameras, mainly his favourite Leica M3. He uses 35 mm and 50 mm lenses for his work.

Plicka has been processing his photos on his own from his beginnings. He changed from darkroom to digital/computer processing in 2004.

== Works ==
- Streets of Sydney. Brandl & Schlesinger. 2001. ISBN 978-1-876040-32-1.
