= March 1926 =

Month of 1926

| << | March 1926 | | | | | >> |
| Su | Mo | Tu | We | Th | Fr | Sa |
| | 1 | 2 | 3 | 4 | 5 | 6 |
| 7 | 8 | 9 | 10 | 11 | 12 | 13 |
| 14 | 15 | 16 | 17 | 18 | 19 | 20 |
| 21 | 22 | 23 | 24 | 25 | 26 | 27 |
| 28 | 29 | 30 | 31 |

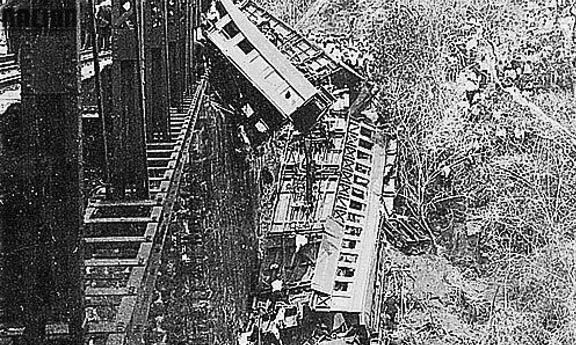
March 14, 1926: Railroad accident in Costa Rica kills 248 people

March 16, 1926: Robert H. Goddard launches his first rocket 184 feet

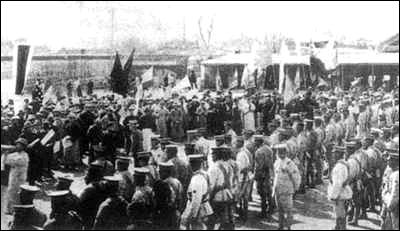
March 18, 1926: Chinese police confront unarmed protesters before firing into the crowd and killing 47.

The following events occurred in March 1926:

== March 1, 1926 (Monday) ==
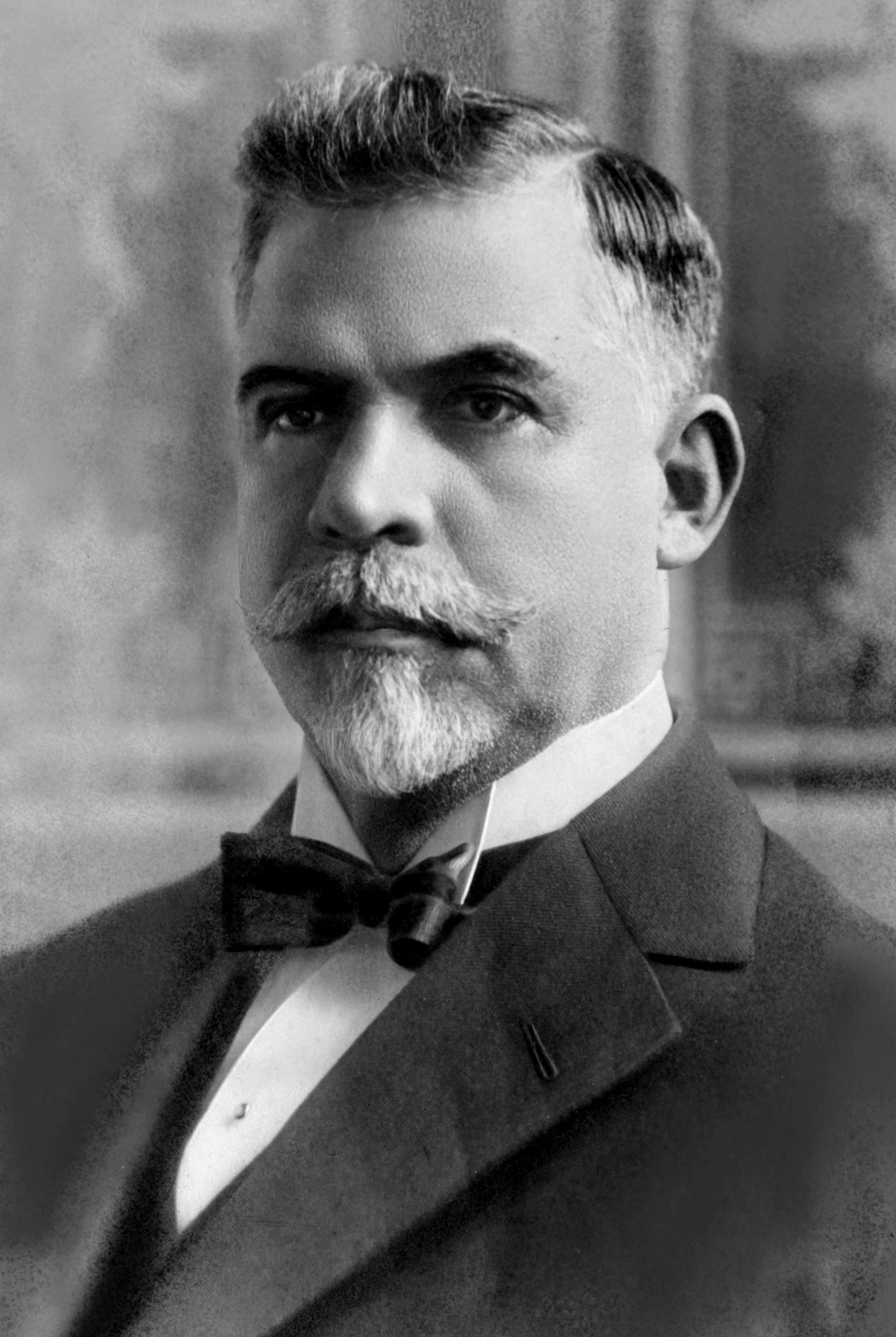
Washington Luis

- Washington Luís, Governor of São Paulo, won the Brazilian presidential election with 99.70% of the vote in a multi-candidate election (with 688,528 votes out of 690,583 cast. A rival candidate,Joaquim Francisco de Assis Brasil received 1,116 votes. Fernando de Melo Viana, Governor of Minas Gerais was separately elected vice-president, with 99.62%.
- For administrative purposes, the former German African territory of Ruanda-Urundi, a League of Nations mandate assigned to administration by the Kingdom of Belgium, and that is now the nations of Rwanda and Burundi, was united with the Belgian Congo (now the Democratic Republic of the Congo).
- The first volume of the 24-volume Great Greek Encyclopedia (Megáli Ellinikí Enkyklopaídeia) was published, with two volumes released every year until its completion in 1934 under the oversight of editor-in-chief Iraklis Apostolidis.
- After a six day trial in Brockton, Massachusetts, Anthony Bimba, the last person in the U.S. to be charged with the crime of blasphemy, was acquitted of charges, though he was convicted on a charge of sedition. Prosecution had been based on a 1697 law still in force in the U.S. state of Massachusetts after a speech he had made on January 26. Bimba was fined $100 for his sedition conviction, a punishment that was dropped after an appeal.
- Born:
  - Pete Rozelle, American sports administrator and NFL commissioner from 1960 to 1989; in South Gate, California (d. 1996)
  - Allen Stanley, Canadian ice hockey player and inductee in the Hockey Hall of Fame; in Timmins, Ontario (d. 2013)
  - Robert Clary (stage name for Robert Widerman), French-born American television actor and Holocaust survivor, known for portraying Corporal LeBeau on Hogan's Heroes; in Paris (d. 2022)
- Died: George W. Hotchkiss, 94, American journalist who founded the Lumberman's Gazette and the Journal of Forest History

== March 2, 1926 (Tuesday) ==
- German Chancellor Hans Luther gave a nationally broadcast speech in which he stated that Germany's entry into the League of Nations was understood to be contingent on no other changes being made to the League's membership council. Luther also expressed Germany's opposition to granting a temporary council seat to Poland, considered to be hostile by Germany.
- U.S. President Calvin Coolidge signed the largest peacetime appropriation bill in American history, allocating almost one billion dollars ($868,281,501, equivalent in 2025 to $15.76 billion dollars) for the U.S. Treasury Department and the U.S. Department of the Post Office.
- In Atlanta, the North Carolina Tar Heels won the only postseason college basketball tournament in the U.S., the championship of the Southern Conference, with 16 of the conference's 22 teams competing. In the final, North Carolina defeated Mississippi A & M University Aggies (now the Mississippi State Bulldogs), 37 to 23.
- An offer by a New York watchmaker to fund, design and install a wristwatch on the Statue of Liberty was formally rejected by the Assistant U.S. Secretary of War, Hanford MacNider. On February 24, watchmaker Oscar M. Lazarus had proposed "an illuminated clock to be attached to the wrist of the Statue of Liberty". MacNider responded that "While the spirit which prompted your offer is appreciated, this department feels constrained to decline it. Aside from any question as to the congruity of so modern an ornament as a wrist watch upon the classically robed figure of Liberty, or the propriety of making alterations in the designer's conception of a work of art presented to this country as a memorial of the traditional friendship between it and France, there is a statute which prohibits any officer of the Government accepting voluntary service for the Government, or employing personal service in excess of that authorized by law. It is believed this statute prevents favorable consideration of your very liberal offer."
- The Nicaraguan daily newspaper La Prensa was founded in Managua and would still be operational 100 years later.
- Born:
  - Carlos Jaschek, German-born Argentine astrophysicist; in Brieg (now Brzeg in Poland) (d. 1999)
  - Murray Rothbard, American Libertarian economist and theoretician of anarcho-capitalism; in The Bronx, New York (d. 1995)
- Died: Ying Lianzhi, 58, Chinese Roman Catholic publisher who founded the newspaper Ta Kung Pao in 1902, died of cancer

== March 3, 1926 (Wednesday) ==
- The Moody Bible Institute (MBI) made the first radio broadcast in the U.S. of an evangelical program, as the Institute's president, James Gray, spoke in a two-hour program broadcast over WENR in Chicago, pending the allocation of a frequency to allow the Institute to broadcast from its own station, WMBI. Gray, who had initially opposed radio broadcasts as sinister (based on a Bible verse at Ephesians 2:2 that described Satan as "the prince of power of the air"), had experienced a change of heart and was surprised to find that his broadcast had been heard as far away Florida.
- Germany and Afghanistan concluded a treaty of friendship, but stopped short of a military alliance, allowing Afghanistan to remain neutral in war.
- Born:
  - Dick Randall (pen name for Irving Reuben), 70, American stage and film producer known for his low-budget exploitation movies, including Cottonpickin' Chickenpickers (1967), The French Sex Murders' (1972), The Clones of Bruce Lee (1982) and Slaughter High (1986) (d. 1996)
  - Ravi Shankar Sharma, Indian film score composer; in Delhi, British India (d. 2012)
  - James Merrill, American poet and 1977 Pulitzer Prize winner for Divine Comedies; in New York City (d. 1995)
  - Tom Reid, Irish rugby union player with 13 caps for the Ireland national team; in Limerick (d. 1996)

== March 4, 1926 (Thursday) ==
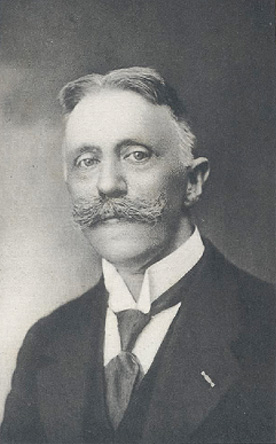
de Geer

- The cabinet crisis in the Netherlands that had existed for almost four months ended as Queen Wilhelmina accepted the multi-party cabinet of ministers formed by former finance minister Dirk Jan de Geer, replacing the government of Hendrikus Colijn, who had resigned on November 14. Prime Minister De Geer, who retained the office of Finance Minister, had a Labor and Commerce Minister from his own Christelijk-Historische Unie (CHU), along with three from the Liberal Party, two from the Anti-Revolutionaire Partij (ARP) members, an Education Minister from the Roomsch-Katholieke Staatspartij (RKSP) and an independent Colonial Affairs Minister.
- United States Daily, an attempt by conservative journalist David Lawrence to launch a national newspaper, published its first issue. It would continue until ceasing publication on May 13, 1933 after which Lawrence launching a weekly magazine, The United States News, later combined with another Lawrence magazine, World Report, to create U.S. News & World Report in 1948.
- Zizi Lambrino filed a lawsuit in Paris against Prince Carol of Romania for 10 million francs, asserting that she was still legally Carol's wife and entitled to money to support herself and their son Carol Lambrino.
- A strange story, sometimes thought to be an urban legend, was reported in the Hungarian newspaper Az Est, concerning a waiter in Budapest who committed suicide and left behind a note containing a complex crossword puzzle as some kind of clue. It does not appear that the mystery was ever solved.
- Born:
  - Richard DeVos, U.S. businessman and billionaire, co-founder of the Amway Corporation and later owner of the NBA Orlando Magic team; in Grand Rapids, Michigan (d. 2018)
  - Daniel Kastler, French theoretical physicist known for the Kadison–Kastler metric and the Haag–Kastler axioms; in Colmar, Haut-Rhin département (d. 2015)
  - Fran Warren (stage name for Frances Wolff), American popular singer and stage musical performer; in The Bronx, New York City (d. 2013)
  - Roy Padilla Sr., Filipino politician and Governor of the Province of Camarines Norte who was assassinated the day before the national elections; in Plaridel, Bulacan province (d. 1988)
- Died:
  - William S. Hackett, 57, Mayor of Albany, New York since 1922, died two weeks after being fatally injured in an automobile accident while visiting Cuba
  - Marie Burroughs (stage name for Lillie Arrington), 59, American stage actress on Broadway, died a week after being stricken with apoplexy (a cerebral hemorrhage).

== March 5, 1926 (Friday) ==
- Ivar Lykke was appointed as the Prime Minister of Norway by King Haakon VII after the resignation of Johan Ludwig Mowinckel, and would serve until 1928.
- In Beijing, Jia Deyao (referred to in the press at the time as "Chi Teh-yao") formed a coalition government of three parties as the permanent Premier of the Republic of China after having served a caretaker role as the acting premier since February 15, in the wake of the resignation of Xu Shiying. Jia named himself as Minister of War, and former Premier Yan Huiqing ("W. W. Yen") as Foreign Minister.
- Pope Pius XI published the encyclical Rerum Ecclesiae, written on February 26, calling for an increase in the number of native Catholic clergymen and missionaries, particularly in Africa, and admonishing white missionaries to avoid prejudice against native missionaries." "It would certainly be wrong to consider these natives an inferior race, dull intellect," the Pope wrote, "Indeed, long experience shows that the peoples of the far eastern and southern regions sometimes rival ours and can easily compete with them in mental acuity." He also his opinion that "If in the heart of barbarous lands one finds men extremely slow to learn, this is due to their condition of life, which, with its very limited demands, does not force them to make great use of their intelligence."
- The Italian-language version of the Gabriele D'Annunzio opera Il martirio di San Sebastiano, an Italian language version of the 1911 French language Le Martyre de saint Sébastien. Translated from the French by Ettore Janni, the opera premiered at La Scala in Milan, and received "a cold reception".
- Born: Anthony Rawlinson, British civil servant who was secretary of the UK Department of Trade, and mountaineer who served as president of the Alpine Club in 1986 until his death two months later; (killed in climbing accident, 1986)

== March 6, 1926 (Saturday) ==
- In the early hours of the morning in Paris, the government of France's Prime Minister Aristide Briand fell after failing to pass a financial bill, by a vote of 221 for and 274 against.
- The Shakespeare Memorial Theatre in Stratford-upon-Avon was destroyed by fire.
- Born:
  - Alan Greenspan, American economist who served as the Chairman of the Federal Reserve Board from 1987 to 2006; in Washington Heights, Manhattan, New York City (d. 2026)
  - Andrzej Wajda, Polish filmmaker and director; in Suwałki, Poland (d. 2016)
  - André Fontaine (artistic name of Julien Gagnon), Canadian painter, in Saint-Gédéon, Quebec (d.2005)
- Died: U.S. Navy Rear Admiral Richard Wainwright, 76, Spanish–American War hero

== March 7, 1926 (Sunday) ==
- On the 50th anniversary of the patenting of the telephone by Alexander Graham Bell, the first wireless trans-Atlantic telephone call was made from New York to London, in a four hour demonstration between the AT&T headquarters in New York City to the British Post Office in London, starting at 8:00 in the morning (1:00 in the afternoon in London) with dozens of journalists from both sides. The quality of the audio was superior to telephone conversations that had been carried out by trans-Atlantic cable.
- A meeting in Geneva among the signatories of the Locarno Treaties agreed that Germany's entry into the League of Nations would be delayed pending the formation of a new French government and a decision regarding permanent council seats for Poland, Spain and Brazil.
- Elections were held in Argentina for 83 of the 158 seats in the Cámara de Diputados de la Nación. The Unión Cívica Radical (UCR) and its leader, former President Hipólito Yrigoyen, lost 10 seats, decreasing its plurality from 70 to 60 seats, while Conservative parties gained 3 seats to reach 43.
- Born:
  - Igor Zotikov, Russian glaciologist and polar explorer who predicted that there were fresh water lakes underneath the Antarctic ice sheet, for whom the Zotikov Glacier is named; in Moscow (d. 2010)
  - Margaret Weston, Welsh British museum curator who directed the Science Museum, London and oversaw its development into the Science Museum Group; in Carmarthen, Carmarthenshire, Wales (d. 2021)
  - Petro Rozumnyi, Ukrainian Soviet dissident; in Chaplynka, Ukrainian SSR (d.2013)
  - Chemmanam Chacko, Indian satirical poet; in Mulakulam, Kingdom of Travancore, British India (now in Kerala state of India) (d. 2018)
- Died: J. Herbert Frank, 40, American stage and silent film actor and suspect in the 1923 death of Wallace Reid, committed suicide with chloroform and gas the day before he was to be tried of charges connected to narcotics charges

== March 8, 1926 (Monday) ==
- A coal mine explosion at the Crab Orchard Mine No. 5 near Eccles, West Virginia killed 28 of the 68 miners inside. Mine No.5 had previously been the site of an explosion in 1914 that killed 186 miners.
- Born: Sultan Salahuddin of Selangor, the 11th monarch and head of state of Malaysia as the Yang di-Pertuan Agong from 1999 until his death in Kuala Langat, Selangor, Federated Malay States (d. 2001)

== March 9, 1926 (Tuesday) ==
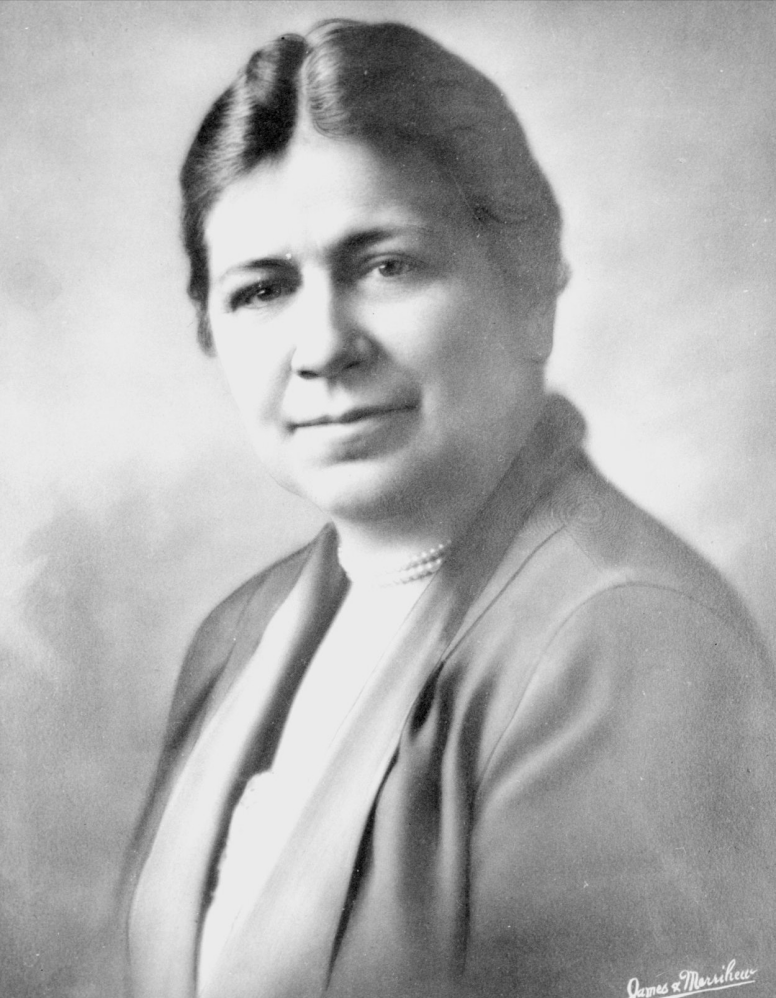
Seattle Mayor Landes

- Bertha Knight Landes, a member of the Seattle City Council in the state of Washington became the first woman to be elected as the mayor of a major American city, defeating the incumbent, Mayor Edwin J. Brown.
- France's Prime Minister Aristide Briand formed his 9th government, after having given his resignation earlier. The new government, which would last less than four months, replaced the Ministers of War, Finance, Interior, Commerce, Public Works and of Public Instruction, while Briand continued his role as Minister of Foreign Affairs.
- Born:
  - Joe Franklin (stage name for Joseph Fortgang), American radio and television personality known for creating (in 1951) the first TV "talk show" and starting the format of interviewing guests after inviting them to perform, a format that ran for 42 years from 1951 until his retirement in 1993; in The Bronx, New York City (d. 2015)
  - Neill Armstrong, American football player and NFL coach; in Tishomingo, Oklahoma (d. 2016)
  - Ibrahim Sakjaha, Jordanian journalist known for founding several newspapers, including Ad-Dustour; in Jaffa, British Mandate for Palestine (now part of Tel Aviv in Israel. (d. 1991)
- Died:
  - Mikao Usui, 60, Japanese founder of the alternative medicine and spiritual practice of Reiki
  - Edward Bliss, 4th Baron Bliss, 57, British-born traveler who bequeathed most of his fortune in his will for a trust fund for the benefit of the citizens of the British Honduras (now Belize); the date of his death is a national holiday in Belize.

== March 10, 1926 (Wednesday) ==
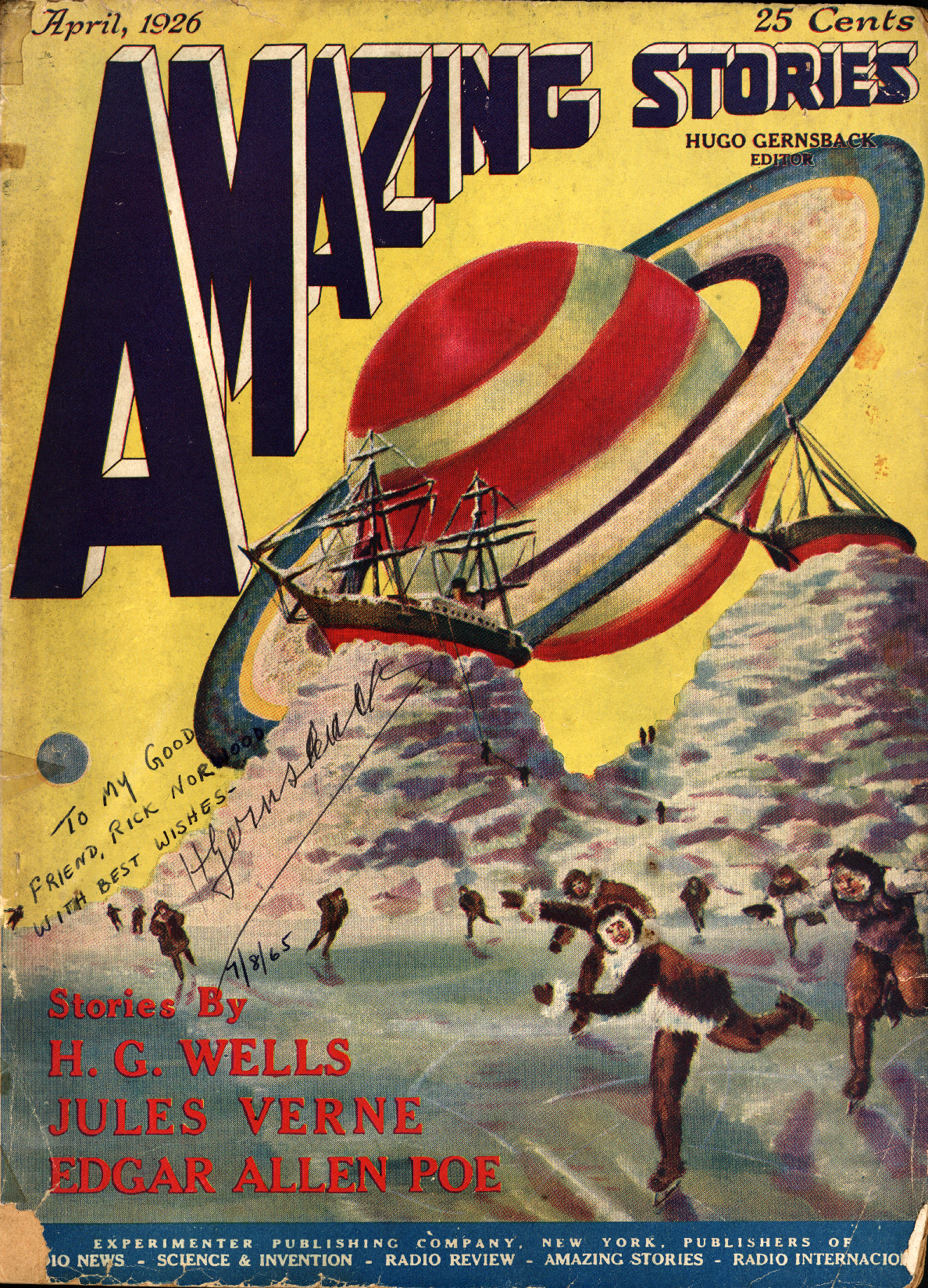

- The first issue of the pioneering science fiction magazine Amazing Stories arrived on newsstands, with a cover date of April 1926.
- Born:
  - Jambyn Batmönkh, leader of the Mongolian People's Republic as General Secretary of the Mongolian Communist Party and as Chairman of the Presidium from 1994 to 1990, previously Prime Minister 1974 to 1984; in Khyargas, Uvs Province (d. 1997)
  - Aleksandr Zatsepin, Russian film score composer; in Novosibirsk, Russian SFSR, Soviet Union (alive in 2026)
  - Marlia Hardi, Indonesian film actress; in Magelang, Dutch East Indies (committed suicide, 1984)
  - Barbara Howard, Canadian artist; in Long Branch, Ontario (d. 2002)

== March 11, 1926 (Thursday) ==
- By a vote of 139 to 27 by the Italian Senate, legislation was passed in Italy banning all non-Fascist labor unions and declared all strikes and lockouts to be unlawful, with compulsory arbitration before special labor magistrates to resolve any disagreements between labor and industry. Premier Benito Mussolini declared that the bill was "the most courageous, most audacious, most radical and most revolutionary reform yet proposed by the Fascist government in its 40 months of office.
- Éamon de Valera resigned as the leader of the Sinn Féin political party in Ireland after the Ard Fheis general assembly failed to approve, by five votes (218 to 223) his motion for the party to have representation in both the Oireachtas (the bicameral parliament of the Irish Free State) and the Parliament of Northern Ireland. De Valera resolved to set up his own political party for Sinn Féin members who had been opposed to the treaty with the United Kingdom.
- The coronation of 17-year-old Yashwant Rao Holkar II as Maharaja of British India's princely kingdom of Indore took place, 16 days after the abdication of his father, Tukojirao Holkar III.
- The Council of the League of Nations voted to approve the award of most of the former Ottoman Empire's Mosul province, to the British Mandate of Iraq and to extend the British mandate an additional 25 years to the year 1951.
- The Chinese warlord Tang Shengzhi was appointed as the military and civil governor of Hunan province after the execution of the previous officeholder, Li Youwen.
- Born:
  - Dr. Thomas Starzl, American surgeon who performed the first successful human liver transplant; in Le Mars, Iowa (d. 2017)
  - Ralph Abernathy, African-American civil rights activist and second president of the Southern Christian Leadership Conference as the successor of Dr. Martin Luther King; near Linden, Alabama (d. 1990)
  - Derek Benfield, English playwright and actor; in Bradford, Yorkshire (d. 2009)

== March 12, 1926 (Friday) ==
- The Savoy Ballroom opened in Harlem at 596 Lenox Avenue in New York City, and would continue operating until its closure on July 10, 1958.
- Plans for building a suspension bridge over the Hudson River to link Fort Lee, New Jersey and the Fort Washington area of Manhattan in New York City were approved by the New York and New Jersey Hudson River Bridge Advisory Committee of the Port Authority. Costs of the four-lane toll bridge were estimated at 50 million U.S. dollars (equivalent to $910,000,000 in 2025).
- Two Japanese destroyers came under fire from the Taku Forts. A captain died of injuries and 2 other sailors were wounded.
- The Italian ocean liner Belvedere arrived in Buenos Aires in Argentina after 30 of its passengers died from measles, peritonitis and bronchial pneumonia while sailing from Trieste.
- Died: E. W. Scripps, 71, American newspaper publisher

== March 13, 1926 (Saturday) ==
- British aviator Alan Cobham completed the first voyage by air from the British colony of South Africa to Britain, landing at Croydon near London after his departure from Cape Town on February 25, and was welcomed by King George V.
- The Syracuse University Orangemen basketball team, which would retroactively be declared the 1925-1926 season national champion by the Helms Foundation, a finding recognized by the NCAA record., closed their 20 game season with a record of 19-1, after defeating Colgate University, 29 to 12.
- Born:
  - Carlos Roberto Reina, President of Honduras 1994 to 1998; in Comayagüela (d. 2003)
  - Lenny Montana (stage name for Leonardo Passafaro), American wrestler and film and TV character actor known for portraying intimidating enforcers, including hitman Luca Brasi in The Godfather; in Brooklyn, New York (d. 1992)

== March 14, 1926 (Sunday) ==
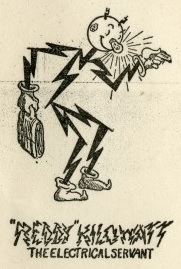
"Reddy Kilowatt"

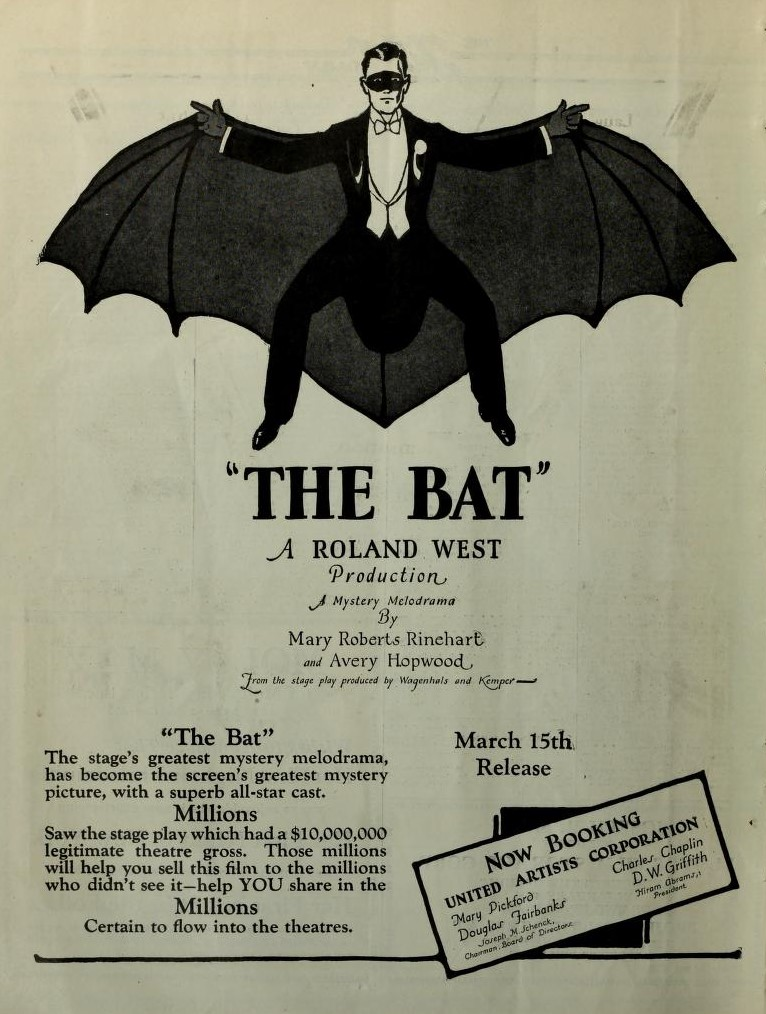
"The Bat"

- A railway accident killed 248 people and injured 93 others in Costa Rica when three of the six passenger cars plunged 190 feet (58 m) into the Virilla River Canyon. The train was carrying religious pilgrims from Alajuela and Heredia to Cartago, Costa Rica, where they were planning to visit the Basílica de Nuestra Señora de los Ángeles. At 8:20 in the morning, the crowded train was crossing the bridge when the last carriage derailed and pulled the fourth and fifth carriages down into the ravine.
- Following a coup d'etat, the forced resignation of Carlos José Solórzano as President of Nicaragua was accepted by the Nicaraguan Congress, and former president Emiliano Chamorro Vargas was installed as the new president.
- The cartoon character "Reddy Kilowatt", emblematic of various electrical utility companies and known for his limbs and torso made of red lightning bolts, was introduced in an advertisement in The Birmingham News for the Alabama Power Company (APC). The character was the brainchild of the APC's advertising manager, Ashton B. Collins Sr.
- The Roland West silent film The Bat, was released by United Artists, with a premiere in New York City. Based on the 1920 Broadway theatre play of the same name, and billed as a "comedy-mystery-drama", The Bat featured a masked villain wearing a cape that resembled a bat's wings.
- Born: Lita Roza, English singer who was the first woman to have a No. 1 pop music hit (for her 1953 recording of "(How Much Is) That Doggie in the Window?") on the UK Singles Chart; in Liverpool, Lancashire (d. 2008)
- Died: Enrique Gómez Muñoz, 27, Spanish footballer who played under the name "Spencer" for the Spain national team, died following complications from an appendectomy.

== March 15, 1926 (Monday) ==
- The signatories to the Boxer Protocol gave China an ultimatum for the commanders of the Taku Forts to remove all mines placed at the mouth of the Pei River and to end their blockade of Tianjin by noon on Friday, March 19. At least 12 ships from the navies of the U.S., the UK, Japan, France and Italy were blocked from traveling into the Pei River to Tianjin, and those nations were authorized to end the blockade by force if necessary.
- The first performance of the Jean Sibelius musical composition The Tempest, Op. 109 took place at Copenhagen, with 34 pieces for an orchestra, a choir and vocalists, serving as incidental music to accompany William Shakespeare's play The Tempest.
- Born:
  - Norm Van Brocklin, American football quarterback nicknamed "The Dutchman", 1960 NFL MVP and later the first head coach of the Minnesota Vikings, inductee into the Pro Football Hall of Fame; in Parade, South Dakota (d. 1983)
  - Sheldon Segal, American embryologist and biochemist, co-developer (with Horacio Croxatto) of the Norplant implant contraceptive; in Brooklyn, New York (d. 2009)
  - Harmon Craig, American geochemist known for developing the field of carbon isotope geochemistry; in New York City (d. 2003)
- Died: Maggie Moore (stage name for Margaret Sullivan), 74, American-born Australian stage actress; in San Francisco

== March 16, 1926 (Tuesday) ==
- Robert Goddard launched the first liquid-fuel rocket at Auburn, Massachusetts in the United States. Using a mixture of gasoline and liquid oxygen, Goddard made the successful launch from his Aunt Effie's farm in Auburn, Massachusetts. Though the "Nell" rocket rose only 41 feet (12 m), the first flight demonstrated that liquid fuels and oxidizers could be used to launch larger rockets to greater heights, leading to the beginning of the "Space Age" in 1957 when a rocket first put a payload into Earth's orbit.
- The first patent for the mass production of silica gel was granted to Walter A. Patrick, who received U.S. Patent No. 1,577,186 for "Process of producing gels for catalytic and adsorbent purposes" after having applied on February 28, 1920.
- British driver Henry Segrave broke the record for fastest speed for an automobile, reaching a speed of 152.33 miles (245.15 km) per hour in the Ladybird, a Sunbeam Tiger, on the hard sands of the beach at the Ainsdale beach near Southport, Lancashire in England.
- In Italy, trial began for five Fascists for the 1924 murder of Socialist politician Giacomo Matteotti. The trial took place in the largely inaccessible coastal town of Chieti and the judge was the brother-in-law of the prominent Fascist politician Roberto Farinacci.
- Born:
  - Jerry Lewis (stage name for Joseph Levitch), American comedian, film actor and longtime fundraiser and chairman of the Muscular Dystrophy Association; in Newark, New Jersey (d. 2017)
  - Geraldine Weiss, American investment adviser for using dividend yield over time as the best measure of value for stock purchases; as Geraldine Schmulowitz in San Francisco (d. 2022)
- Died: Sergeant Stubby, 10, World War I American Boston Terrier war dog assigned to U.S. Army's 26th Infantry Division and known for his heroism in combat. He was the most decorated American dog in World War One, and was the only dog to receive a military rank.

== March 17, 1926 (Wednesday) ==
- Czechoslovakia's Prime Minister Antonín Švehla resigned along with his cabinet after being unable to get parliamentary approval for raising the wages of government employees. President Tomas Masaryk directed former Premier Jan Černý to form a new cabinet.
- The musical The Girl Friend, with music by Richard Rodgers and lyrics by Lorenz Hart opened on Broadway at the Vanderbilt Theatre for the first of 301 performances. The show debuted the hit song "Blue Room", initially sung by Eva Puck and Sammy White.
- Born: Siegfried Lenz, German novelist and playwright; in Lyck, East Prussia (now Ełk, Poland) (d. 2014)
- Died: Aleksei Brusilov, 72, Russian general known for commanding the Russian Imperial Army in the 1916 Brusilov offensive in Eastern Galicia against the Central Powers, primarily the army of Austria-Hungary, with more than 440,000 of his own men killed in the process of winning the campaign. His obituary in The New York Times noted that Brusilov had been "hailed as the savior of Russia and the Allies, the nemesis of Germany" and for having "almost brought complete disaster to the Austrians and Germans."

== March 18, 1926 (Thursday) ==
- The March 18 Massacre took place in Beijing. Chinese government troops and police shot and killed 47 unarmed demonstrators, and wounded 200 others, as they were protesting unequal treaties with foreign powers and an ultimatum issued three days earlier. The protests occurred after China's government accepted the March 15 ultimatum to end the blockade of the port of Tianjin, and agreed to remove all mines and other impediments to foreign entry.

The Academy of Athens

- The modern Academy of Athens (Akadimía Athinón), now the highest research institute in Greece, was established, and modeled after the philosophy of the Academy of Plato established in the 4th century BC (c. 385 BC).
- U.S. Army Second Lieutenant John Sewell Thompson became the first American military officer to be executed in peacetime, and the only graduate in the history of the United States Military Academy at West Point to be executed in the history of that institution. Thompson, 25 years old, was hanged at Fort McKinley in the Philippines after being convicted in a court-martial for the murder of his 17-year-old fiancee, Audrey Burleigh.
- Born:
  - Peter Graves (stage name for Peter Aurness), American actor known for Mission: Impossible; in Minneapolis (d. 2010)
  - Akkitham Achuthan Namboothiri, Indian poet and novelist and 2019 Jnanpith Award recipient; in Kumaranellur, Madras Presidency, British India (now in the Indian state of Kerala) (d. 2020)
  - Käthe Smudits Sasso, Austrian resistance activist in World War II and Holocaust survivor; in Vienna (d. 2024)
  - Irvin Williams, American gardener who served as the head gardener (from 1962 to 2008) for the White House, principal maintainer of the Rose Garden; in Engle, West Virginia (d. 2018)
- Died:
  - John Calvin Coolidge, Sr., 80, U.S. politician and father of the incumbent U.S. President, Calvin Coolidge

== March 19, 1926 (Friday) ==
- The asteroid 2732 Witt, the first of at least 1,600 in the "Witt family" of asteroids that share similarities in orbital characteristics, was discovered in Heidelberg by German astronomer Max Wolf. It is only one of 17 known "A-type asteroids distinct by having a high amount of the mineral olivine.
- The spree of bank and jewelry robberies committed in the U.S. by the Whittemore Gang came to an end after a little more than year when the remaining seven members, including gang leader Richard Reese Whittemore, were arrested by the New York Police Department at The Chantee, a night club at 132 West Fifty-second Street.
- Born:
  - Elaine LaLanne, American fitness and nutrition guru and wife of Jack LaLanne; as Elaine Doyle in Minneapolis (alive in 2026).
  - Ray Verhaeghe, Belgian television actor known for his recurring role in the Belgian soap opera Familie since 1992 (alive in 2026)
- Died:
  - "Wild Bill" Hutchison, 66, American baseball pitcher and the last major league player to pitch 500 innings in a single season, accomplished in 1892, appearing in 72 games in a 146-game season.
  - Jerome J. Murif, 63, Australian engineer known for being the first person to ride a bicycle across the Australian continent

== March 20, 1926 (Saturday) ==
- General Chiang Kai-shek, commander of the leader of the Republic of China's National Revolutionary Army, carried out a purge of Communists from the Republic's military and his Kuomintang political party, using a suspected Communist coup d'etat against him as his pretext. The coup arose from the sudden relocation of the gunship SS Zhongshan by its captain, the Communist officer Li Zhilong. In addition to Li, the Nationalists arrested Wang Jingwei, Deng Yanda, and future Communist Chinese premier Zhou Enlai. Operating from the Republic's capital at Guangzhou (at the time, referred to in the Western press as Canton), Chiang declared martial law in the city, cut off its telephone network, and then sent Nationalist troops to arrest Li and other Communist officials.
- Charles R. Forbes, who had served as the first Director of the U.S. Veterans' Bureau for U.S. President Warren G. Harding from 1921 to 1923, began his prison sentence at Leavenworth Federal Prison after his conviction for defrauding the U.S. government was upheld by the U.S. Circuit Court of Appeals.
- Hungarian electrical engineer and physicist Kálmán Tihanyi received Hungarian patent T-3768 for his invention of the Radioskop, the charge-storage television tube.
- Born: Harold Rosen, American electrical engineer known for designing and overseeing the building of the world's first geosynchronous communications satellite, Syncom 2, launched in 1964; in New Orleans (d.2017)
- Died: Queen Mother Louise, 74, widow of King Frederick VIII of Denmark, and the mother of both King Christian X of Denmark and King Haakon VII of Norway

== March 21, 1926 (Sunday) ==
- Reza Shah Pahlavi, who had been proclaimed as the absolute monarch of Iran three months earlier, outraged Shi'ite Islamic clerics by entering the Fatima Masumeh Shrine without removing his polished military boots, an act "considered ritually unclean". The Shah then whipped a Muslim cleric who had been heard to criticize women in the royal family who had not worn veils during their visit to Qom the day before.
- The silent comedy film Tramp, Tramp, Tramp, written by Frank Capra, produced by and starring comedian Harry Langdon, and featuring Joan Crawford, premiered.
- Born: André Delvaux, Belgian film director, winner of two André Cavens Awards for cinematic achievement in Belgium for Woman Between Wolf and Dog (1979) and The Abyss (1988); in Oud-Heverlee, Flemish Brabant (d. 2002)
- Died:
  - Major General Oswald H. Ernst, 83, American military officer who was superintendent of the United States Military Academy at West Point from 1893 to 1898, later the U.S. Army Chief of Staff, 1914 to 1917
  - Alfred Dwight Foster Hamlin, 70, American architect, was killed when he was struck by a car. Crossing New York City's Riverside Drive near his home on 117th Street, Hamlin was fatally injured and died a few minutes after arriving at a hospital.
  - Sir Bradford Leslie, 95, British engineer described as "one of the greatest bridge builders in the world" and known for designing and construction of the Jubilee Bridge in British India at Calcutta
  - Che Mah, 88, Chinese born American sideshow performer billed by P. T. Barnum as the "smallest man in the world" at a height of 28 inches (71 cm), promoted as "The Chinese Dwarf" and known for wearing queue 13 feet (4.0 m) long.

== March 22, 1926 (Monday) ==
- The Brazilian passenger ship Paes de Carvalho caught fire and sank in the Amazon River at Coari, killing 104 of the 189 people aboard. The steamer was traveling from Manaus, Amazonas, to Torijura, and was carrying a full cargo, including inflammable goods.
- A one-way traffic system came into effect at Hyde Park Corner in London.
- The German drama film The Brothers Schellenberg premiered at the Ufa-Palast am Zoo in Berlin.

Born:

- Ivo Babuška, Czech-born American mathematician specializing in partial differential equations, and known for the Babuška–Lax–Milgram theorem and for the Ladyzhenskaya–Babuška–Brezzi condition; in Prague, Czechoslovakia (d. 2023)
- Franca Falcucci, Italian politician, member of the Christian Democracy Party. She served at the Senate and was the first woman to become minister of public education.(d. 2014).

Died:

- Joseph Jean Baptiste Neuberg, 85, Luxembourg mathematician known for the Neuberg cubic

== March 23, 1926 (Tuesday) ==
- The publication and release of the first of 30 volumes of the Great Soviet Encyclopedia was announced from Moscow by the Soviet government.
- Sir Harcourt Butler, Governor of British Burma (now in the Republic of Myanmar), announced that slavery had been suppressed in Burma after negotiations in the Hukawng Valley between various chiefs of the Naga people and J. T. O. Barnard, the British Deputy Commissioner of the Burma Frontier Service. Barnard had reported that 3,487 slaves had been released after payments to the Naga tribes.
- Germany's Reichstag rejected a motion of no confidence in the government of Chancellor Hans Luther, with only 141 in favor and 259 against. The motion had been brought in the wake of the Luther's support of the Locarno treaties and his attempts to have Germany join the League of Nations.
- Cushman Dam in Mason County, Washington, the first of several, was formally activated to supply power to Tacoma, Washington.
- A single bullet struck and wounded six people in an unusual accident at a U.S. Army base in San Juan, Puerto Rico. According to reports the next day, a private in the U.S. 65th Infantry was cleaning a rifle when the gun discharged, and "the bullet wounded Private Rodriguez in the abdomen, then struck Private J. Delgadoh on the right knee, was deflected from a rifle leaning against a scorer's box and struck Private M. Emiliano in the neck, then struck in turn Captain John T. Dibrell and Lieutenant John Shaw and finally lodged in the hip of Private A. Roque."

== March 24, 1926 (Wednesday) ==
- The trial for the 1924 murder of Giacomo Matteotti ended with two Fascists acquitted and the other three sentenced to almost six years in prison for "unintentional murder". Amerigo Dumini, and Ameleto Poveromo each received sentences of five years, 11 months and 20 days imprisonment, while Giuseppe Viola and Augusto Malacria were acquitted of all charges. However, in consideration of an amnesty law passed by the government the previous year for any political murders arising from "unforeseen circumstances", the sentences were reduced by four years to 23 months and 20 days, and credit for time served (21 months), Volpi and Poveromo had to serve only two months more. Dumini, the ringleader, got an 8-month sentence.
- A national appeal to rebuild the Shakespeare Memorial Theatre, which had recently been destroyed by fire, was launched in England in an appeal signed by Prime Minister Stanley Baldwin and Opposition Leader Ramsay MacDonald.
- Born:
  - Dario Fo, Italian author and Nobel Prize in Literature laureate; in Leggiuno (d. 2016)
  - Martin Shubik, American mathematical economist and specialist in game theory; in New York City (d. 2018)
  - Desmond Connell, Irish Catholic cardinal and Archbishop of Dublin from 1988 to 2004, later asked to retire for helping cover up clerical sex abuse in Dublin; in Dublin (d. 2017)
  - Rowena Jackson, New Zealand prima ballerina; in Invercargill (d. 2024)
  - Ventsislav Yankov, Bulgarian pianist; in Sofia (d. 2022)
- Died: Phan Châu Trinh, 53, Vietnamese independence activist and pacifist

== March 25, 1926 (Thursday) ==
- For the first time, a military guard was posted to protect the U.S. Tomb of the Unknown Soldier at Arlington National Cemetery, with guards on duty while the cemetery was open from 7:30 in the morning until 5:00 in the afternoon. Continuous guarding of the tomb would not begin until July 2, 1937.
- The company Carrozzeria Touring Superleggera, Italian manufacturer of custom-made auto bodies(coaches) and inventor of the superleggera technology, was established in Milan by Felice Bianchi Anderloni (1882–1948) and Gaetano Ponzoni.
- Born:
  - Gene Shalit, American film critic and long time reviewer for The Today Show; in New York City (d. 2026)
  - Hans Rausing, Swedish industrialist, billionaire and philanthropist, and former co-owner of the Tetra Pak food packaging company; in Gothenburg (d. 2019)
  - Riz Ortolani, Italian film score composer; in Pesaro (d. 2014)
  - László Papp, Hungarian middleweight and light middlweight boxer, gold medalist in three consecutive Olympics (1948, 1952 and 1956); in Budapest (d. 2003)
  - Fernando Morán, Foreign Minister of Spain from 1982 to 1985; in Avilés (d. 2020)

== March 26, 1926 (Friday) ==
- The governments of the Second Polish Republic and the Kingdom of Romania signed a Treaty of Alliance to bolster security in Eastern Europe.
- Britain's Grand National steeplechase horse race was won by the gelding Jack Horner.
- The Emmerich Kálmán opera Die Zirkusprinzessin (The Circus Prince) was staged for the first time, with a premiere performance in Vienna at the Theater an der Wien, where it would be staged 344 times. On the opening night, the opera's star, Hubert Marischka, was singing when an unidentified woman in the audience shouted, as a prank, that there the theatre was on fire. Marischka defused the crisis as he stopped singing and then claimed that the false alarm was actually part of the opera, and then received permission from Austria's President Michael Hainisch, who was among the spectators, to continue.
- The French franc tumbled to 29.15 to the American dollar, the lowest in the currency's history, as a devaluation crisis began to develop in France.
- Died:
  - Constantin Fehrenbach, 74, Chancellor of Germany 1920 to 1921
  - Georges Bénédite, 70, French Egyptologist and director of the Egyptian antiuities section of the Louvre, became "the sixth prominent personality to fall victim to what believers in occult powers have already begun to call the “vengeance of Tut-ankh-Amen", after the deaths of Lord Carnarvon, George J. Gould, Wolfe Joel, Sir Archibald Douglas Reid, and Paul Casanova, who had died three days earlier on March 23.
  - Agnes Smith Lewis, 93, English archaeologist and translator known for discovering, with her sister Margaret Dunlop Gibson, the Syriac palimpsest of the Gospels and the first leaf of the Hebrew Ecclesiasticus.

== March 27, 1926 (Saturday) ==
- The American School of Classical Studies at Athens (ASCSA) and the government of Greece reached an agreement for the excavation of the ancient Agora of Athens, a project that would begin in 1931 as the largest archaeological excavation in history.
- The Kurt Weill opera Der Protagonist with the German language libretto by Georg Kaiser, was given its first performance, premiering at the Semperoper in Dresden.
- In the annual rowing of The Boat Race on the River Thames in London, Cambridge University's rowing team defeated Oxford University by five lengths after two of the Oxford rowers suffered sudden exhaustion.
- Born: Frank O'Hara, American poet; in Baltimore (killed in pedestrian accident, 1966)
- Died:
  - Georges Vézina, 39, Canadian NHL goaltender, died of tuberculosis contracted during the 1924-25 NHL season. The NHL's Vezina Trophy for the league's best goaltender is named in his honor; he would be inducted into the Hockey Hall of Fame in 1945.
  - Anna M. Harkness, 88, American philanthropist known for establishing The Commonwealth Fund in 1918
  - George Shima (Ushijima Kinji), 61, Japanese-born American entrepreneur nicknamed "The Potato King" of California, where he had become a millionaire while controlling 85% of the potato crop in the state.

== March 28, 1926 (Sunday) ==
The Austro-Hungarian Empire's ethnic groups in 1914

- A manifesto that had been drawn up by Archduke Franz Ferdinand of Austria in April, 1914, for what he would do upon becoming Emperor of Austria and King of Hungary, were published by his former counselor, Baron Johann Eichoff, in the Vienna newspaper Die Reichspost. Franz Ferdinand had planned to transform the Empire into a nation of self-governing states under a central government, modeled after the United States, with individual states set aside for the Empire's various ethnic groups, for speakers of German, Hungarian, Czech, Slovak, Polish, Romanian, Croatian, Italian, and Ruthenian (spoken in Lithuania and Ukraine) with a federal government responsible for foreign policy, national defense and taxation. He was assassinated on June 28, 1914, two months after writing his manifesto and died without ever ascending the throne of Austria-Hungary.
- Police fought rioters in Paris following the election of two communists— identified in the press as pastry cook Jacques Duclos and lawyer Albert Fournier— to the Chamber of Deputies.
- Born:
  - Ion Ioanid, Romanian dissident who spent 12 years in prisons and labor camps between 1949 and 1965; in Ilovăț (d. 2003)
  - Cayetana Fitz-James Stuart, 18th Duchess of Alba, Spanish aristocrat known for having at least 80 titles of nobility, more than any other person in the world, including eight titles of Duchess, 19 titles of Marchioness, and 22 titles of Countess; at Liria Palace in Madrid (d. 2014)
- Died: Prince Philippe, Duke of Orléans, 57, Orleanist pretender to the throne (as great-grandson of French King Louis Philippe) of the defunct Kingdom of France and head of the House of Orléans since the death of his father, Prince Philippe, Count of Paris in 1894, died of pneumonia while in exile in Italy. His second cousin, Prince Jean, Duke of Guise, another great-grandson of King Louis Philippe, declared himself the new leader of the House of Orleans and the new pretender.

== March 29, 1926 (Monday) ==
- The modern, 800-bed Singapore General Hospital, now the largest hospital in the Asian nation, was formally opened by Sir Laurence Guillemard, the British Governor of the Straits Settlements.
- At Jammu in British India, Sir Hari Singh Bahadur was formally crowned as the Maharaja of the princely state of Jammu and Kashmir after having succeeded to the throne on September 23, 1925, upon the death of his uncle, Pratap Singh.
- The U.S. government granted permission for two breweries to make 3.76% "malt tonic" to be sold through drug stores without prescription for a six-month trial period.

== March 30, 1926 (Tuesday) ==
- Alexandru Averescu became Prime Minister of Romania for the third time after having previously served in 1918 and from 1920 to 1927. Averescu replaced Ion I. C. Brătianu, who had resigned for health reasons on March 27 after serving for more than four years.
- Roberto Farinacci, known for his extreme right-wing views, was forced to resign as General Secretary of the National Fascist Party of Italy, after less than a year in office. His 1925 decision to not admit new members caused membership to drop from 650,000 to 600,000. The rest of the Fascist Party's nine member Grand Council (Gran Consiglio del Fascismo) resigned along with him. After Farinacci's replacement, the curb against new members was lifted and membership in the Fascist Party increased rapidly to one million members by 1927.
- The Consolidated Stock Exchange of New York, a competitor to the New York Stock Exchange, reopened after having been barred for almost two months from operating., but would fail to complete the year.
- France shipped out 340 convicts, with another 340 to be picked up in Algiers, on a boat bound for Devil's Island. The government had previously committed to winding down and closing the nefarious colonial prison, but it abandoned the pledge due to jail overcrowding.
- Born:
  - Ingvar Kamprad, Swedish businessman who founded the multinational furniture company IKEA in 1943; in Älmhult (d. 2018)
  - Peter Marshall (stage name for Ralph LaCock), American television game show host known for The Hollywood Squares; in Clarksburg, West Virginia (d. 2024)
  - Sydney Chaplin, American stage actor and winner of a Tony Award in 1957 for Bells Are Ringing; in Beverly Hills, California, to Charlie Chaplin and Lita Grey (d. 2009)

== March 31, 1926 (Wednesday) ==
- The Italian Senate was completely reorganized into a syndicalist body by decree of Premier Benito Mussolini. Specifically, the Senate was to be composed of two categories, both appointed by the King of Italy. Some senators were to be nominated for 9-year terms by the four government-approved corporate and labor organizations (the National Fascist Association of Banks, the General Confederation of Industry, the Central Organization of Fascist Labor Unions, and the Central Organization of Intellectuals, with an equal number with no connections to labor or business. The plan was formally approved by the Senate on April 3, 1926.
- Augusto Turati, one of the more moderate members of Italy's Fascist Party, was selected as the new Fascist General Secretary, succeeding the extreme right-wing Roberto Farinacci.
- Statistican Frederick L. Hoffman of the Prudential Life Insurance Company of America was quoted in the insurance journal, The Spectator as saying that the murder rate in the U.S. for 1925 "is the worst we have thus far experienced", with the rate for death by murder having increased to 11.1 per 100,000 people.
- Born:
  - John Fowles, English novelist known for The Magus (1963) and The French Lieutenant's Woman (1969); in Leigh-on-Sea, Essex (d. 2005)
  - Tseng Wen-hui, First Lady of the Republic of China as wife of Taiwanese president Lee Teng-hui from 1988 to 2000; in Sanshi Village, Taihoku Prefecture, Formosa, Empire of Japan (now New Taipei City, Taiwan) (living in 2026)
  - James Costigan, American television screenwriter and three-time Emmy Award winner; in East Los Angeles, California (d. 2007)
  - Harold von Braunhut, American novelty inventor and marketer known for creating Sea-Monkeys (1957) and X-ray specs; in Memphis, Tennessee (d. 2003)
- Died: Maria Alves, 29, Portuguese stage actress, was murdered in Lisbon
