= Seamonkey =

Seamonkey may refer to:

- Sea-Monkeys, brine shrimp sold as novelty aquarium pets
  - Brine shrimp
- SeaMonkey, a web browser and email client application suite.
- The Amazing Live Sea Monkeys, a television series
