= Bryans Road, Maryland =

- Census-designated place
- Location of Bryans Road, Maryland
- Coordinates: 38°37′41″N 77°4′54″W
- Country: United States
- State: Maryland
- County: Charles

Area
  - Total: 15.38 sq mi (39.84 km^{2})
  - Land: 15.38 sq mi (39.84 km^{2})
  - Water: 0 sq mi (0.00 km^{2})
- Elevation: 177 ft (54 m)

Population (2020)
  - Total: 8,650
  - Density: 562.3/sq mi (217.12/km^{2})
- Time zone: UTC−5 (Eastern (EST))
  - Summer (DST): UTC−4 (EDT)
- ZIP code: 20616
- Area codes: 301 and 240
- FIPS code: 24-10925
- GNIS feature ID: 0589840

Bryans Road is a census-designated place (CDP) in Charles County, Maryland, United States. Per the 2020 census, the population was 8,650.

Bryans Road was named after Oliver Norris Bryan, a 19th-century farmer and scientist who owned and operated Locust Grove Farm near Marshall Hall. The area consisted mostly of tobacco farms until the establishment of the Naval Proving Grounds at Indian Head in 1890. Some commercial establishments came about by the early 1920s, when the name "Bryans Road" first appeared on maps. The construction of Maryland Route 210 (Indian Head Highway) during World War II brought new traffic. By the early 1960s, Bryans Road became an established bedroom community for both Indian Head and Washington, D.C.

At the main intersection of Bryans Road, a shopping center includes a supermarket, various gas stations, and assorted retail stores that serves the community. Local residents commute to work at the Indian Head Naval Surface Warfare Center, while others commute to employment centers throughout the greater Washington, D.C. metropolitan area. In 1998, plans for a massive housing development project at Chapman's Landing were thwarted by the Maryland state government, which bought the property to preserve green space under its smart growth policy.

Marshall Hall was listed on the National Register of Historic Places in 1976, and Mount Aventine was listed in the Register in 1996.

== Geography ==
According to the United States Census Bureau, the CDP has a total area of 15.380 square miles (39.834 km^{2}), all land. The central part of the community is now dominated by a large water tower just behind the fire department. Maryland Airport, the only airport in Charles County, is located nearby in Pomonkey.

The Charles County Board of Commission commissioned a review to study the cross-county connector, a proposed road to link Maryland Route 5 south of Waldorf to Indian Head Highway in Bryans Road, to address traffic congestion along the Indian Head Highway (Maryland Route 210) corridor. However, plans to build the cross county connector fell dormant after objections from environmentalists and rejections for permits by the Maryland Department of the Environment and the Army Corps of Engineers. In October 2013, the Charles County Board of Commissioners decided to introduce a draft plan at a community meeting that featured a scaled-down plan for area improvements, including alternatives to the cross-county connector.

== Demographics ==
Historical population
| Census | Pop. | Note | %± |
|---|---|---|---|
| 2000 | 4,910 | | — |
| 2010 | 7,244 | | 47.5% |
| 2020 | 8,650 | | 19.4% |
U.S. Decennial Census; 2010 2020

=== Racial and ethnic composition ===
Bryans Road CDP, Maryland – Racial and ethnic composition Note: the US Census treats Hispanic/Latino as an ethnic category. This table excludes Latinos from the racial categories and assigns them to a separate category. Hispanics/Latinos may be of any race.
| Race / Ethnicity (NH = Non-Hispanic) | Pop 2010 | Pop 2020 | % 2010 | % 2020 |
|---|---|---|---|---|
| White alone (NH) | 2,361 | 1,658 | 32.59% | 19.17% |
| Black or African American alone (NH) | 4,069 | 5,347 | 56.17% | 61.82% |
| Native American or Alaska Native alone (NH) | 62 | 66 | 0.86% | 0.76% |
| Asian alone (NH) | 215 | 309 | 2.97% | 3.57% |
| Pacific Islander alone (NH) | 2 | 20 | 0.03% | 0.23% |
| Some Other Race alone (NH) | 5 | 48 | 0.07% | 0.55% |
| Mixed Race or Multi-Racial (NH) | 252 | 462 | 3.48% | 5.34% |
| Hispanic or Latino (any race) | 278 | 740 | 3.84% | 8.55% |
| Total | 7,244 | 8,650 | 100.00% | 100.00% |

=== 2020 census ===
As of the 2020 census, Bryans Road had a population of 8,650. The median age was 37.2 years. 25.1% of residents were under the age of 18 and 11.7% of residents were 65 years of age or older. For every 100 females there were 88.4 males, and for every 100 females age 18 and over there were 83.7 males age 18 and over.

87.4% of residents lived in urban areas, while 12.6% lived in rural areas.

There were 3,010 households in Bryans Road, of which 37.1% had children under the age of 18 living in them. Of all households, 46.1% were married-couple households, 15.8% were households with a male householder and no spouse or partner present, and 33.0% were households with a female householder and no spouse or partner present. About 22.8% of all households were made up of individuals and 6.5% had someone living alone who was 65 years of age or older.

There were 3,124 housing units, of which 3.6% were vacant. The homeowner vacancy rate was 0.5% and the rental vacancy rate was 3.0%.

=== 2010 census ===
As of the census of 2010, there were 7,244 people, 2,504 households, and 1,849 families residing in the CDP. The population density was 470.9 inhabitants per square mile (181.8/km^{2}). There were 2,694 housing units at an average density of 175.2 housing units per square mile (67.6/km^{2}). The racial makeup of the CDP was 34.0% White, 56.9% African American, 1.0% Native American, 3.0% Asian, 0.1% Pacific Islander, 1.0% from other races, and 4.0% from two or more races. Hispanic or Latino of any race were 3.8% of the population.

There were 2,504 households, out of which 34.9% had children under the age of 18 living in the household, 48.3% were married couples living together, 20.1% had a female householder with no husband present, and 26.2% were non-families. In addition, 21.4% of households were made up of individuals with 2.2% of males age 65 years or older and 3.5% of females age 65 years or older living alone. The average household size was 2.89, and the average family size was 3.35.

In the CDP, the population was spread out, with 6.8% under the age of 5 years old, 23.1% from 5 to 19 years old, 33.7% from 20 to 44 years old, 26% from 45 to 64 years old, and 10.4% who were 65 years of age or older. The median age was 37.2 years old. For every 100 females, there were 92.4 males, while for every 100 females age 18 and over, there were 89.8 males.

The median income for a household in the CDP was $86,016, and the median income for a family was $96,250. Males had a median income of $63,375 versus $53,244 for females. The per capita income for the CDP was $32,559. About 1.4% of families and 3.6% of the population were below the poverty line, including 4.7% of those under age 18 and 4% of those age 65 or over.

== Public schools ==
Bryans Road is served by the Charles County Public Schools for students in kindergarten and grade 1 through grade 12. Public schools that serve Bryans Road include J.C. Parks Elementary School, Matthew Henson Middle School and Henry E. Lackey High School.

== Notable people ==
- A. J. DeLaGarza, Major League Soccer player
- Greg Boyer, trombonist
- Harold von Braunhut, creator of Amazing Sea-Monkeys
