= George W. Hotchkiss =

19th-century pioneer lumber dealer

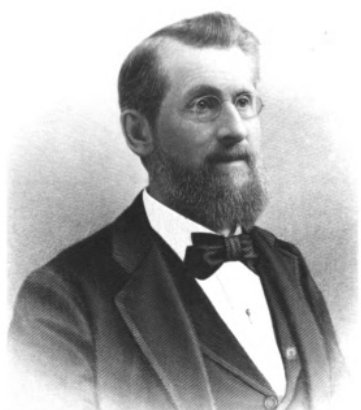
- 1898
- Born: October 16, 1831; New Haven, Connecticut, US
- Died: March 1, 1926 (aged 94); Evanston, Illinois, US
- Occupations: journalist, lumber dealer
- Known for: journalism
- Title: Editor
- Spouse: Elizabeth St. John
- Children: 2

Signature
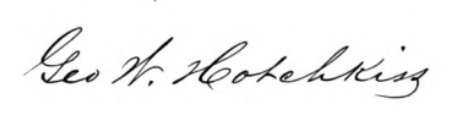

George Woodward Hotchkiss (October 16, 1831 – March 1, 1926) was an American nineteenth-century businessman and journalist who wrote about the lumber industry. He was co-founder and editor of several newspapers, including what the Journal of Forest History has considered to be North America's first lumber newspaper, Lumberman's Gazette. He contributed to the publication of a manual on the timber trade, which sold 40,000 copies. In 1898 he published the book History of the Lumber and Forest Industry of the Northwest. In the view of one 1920s author, Hotchkiss was the "father" of lumber periodicals.

Hotchkiss was one of the Californian "forty-niners" who prospected for gold. At the age of 18, he made the 154-day sailing trip around the southern tip of South America to get to California, and by his own account opened the first trading post in Sacramento County, California. He was one of the signatories of the petition for California state status. Later during his life, he was an alderman and town supervisor in Bay City, Michigan, as well as a supervisor and a justice of the peace in Evanston, Illinois. At the time of his death in 1926, a newspaper reported that he was the last of forty-niners alive.

== Early years and education ==
Hotchkiss was born on October 16, 1831, in New Haven, Connecticut. His parents were Ellas Woodward and Almira Woodward Hotchkiss. He had four brothers and four sisters, and was the sixth child in the family. Hotchkiss was of English and Welsh ancestry; his ancestors were Huguenots who emigrated to Switzerland and from there went with the Plymouth Colony to America, settling at Guilford, Connecticut. Hotchkiss as a child attended the Lancasterian School in New Haven. He later attended the Russell Military Academy of New Haven for two years.

== Mid-life and business career ==
=== Forty-niner ===
Hotchkiss left the Russell Military Academy in June 1848, just before he was 17 years old. He went to work for his older brother Thomas as a clerk and bookkeeper. His brother had taken over their father's lumber yard in New Haven the year before.

Prompted by the California gold rush, Hotchkiss went to that state in the spring of 1849. The 154-day sailing trip from the east coast involved going around Cape Horn, the southernmost tip of South America where the Atlantic and Pacific oceans meet. The voyage ended in San Francisco with many other gold-seekers, who were known as "forty-niners". In California he worked as a clerk of a general store in Sacramento for about a year, then opened a trading post in the Greenwood Valley near Sacramento in early 1850. In that year he was one of the signers of the petition for California statehood application.

=== Entrepreneur in lumber ===
Hotchkiss in his own 1898 book History of the Lumber and Forest Industry of the Northwest gives a autobiographical account of his life in the 1850s. He explains that he returned to Connecticut late in 1850 with just 25 cents in his pocket. He was hoping to return to California, funded from the profits of an investment in a dam on the American River. The investment did not pay out and in early 1851 he went to Port Dover, Ontario, Canada, where he joined his brother-in-law Henry Wheeler as a lumber dealer serving the Albany, New York, market. He purchased Wheeler's business at Albany in 1855 and added grain commodities as a marketing product. He continued operating the business until 1862 when merchants of the United States were forced to halt any Canadian operations due to the ongoing American Civil War.

Hotchkiss then went to Buffalo, New York, for a short break from business. He then took a job as the manager for a Buffalo-based company that had a barge line on the Great Lakes that operated to Saginaw, Michigan. The firm out of Buffalo was Noyes & Reed, which had three rebuilt steamboats in its fleet of barges, which were used for hauling large quantities of lumber. Hotchkiss moved to nearby Bay City, Michigan, in late 1862.

Railroad lines were soon built on the south side of Lake Erie; they took all of the lumber traffic and barges were no longer needed. In late 1863, Hotchkiss joined with Andrew H. Hunter to form Hunter & Hotchkiss, a lumber dealer (the firm later changed names a couple of times). Their successful business towed log booms from Tobico Bay and the Rifle River to Bay City to turn into lumber. While living in Bay City, Hotchkiss was an alderman and town supervisor. In 1866, Hotchkiss's company contracted to build a 17-mile (27 km) plank road from Bay City to Midland, Michigan. They built a sawmill in the town of Williams, Michigan, about halfway between the two cities. The loss of two rafts of logs on Saginaw Bay and bad weather caused the company to go bankrupt. Hotchkiss then established a sawmill and surrounding village in northern Michigan, but it was subsequently destroyed by a fire in 1874.

=== Lumber journalist ===
In 1869, between some of his business efforts with lumber, Hotchkiss took employment at the editorial department of the Saginaw Daily Courier, which was his first job in journalism. He was associated with another writer, Henry S. Dow, and they started publishing the Lumberman's Gazette in 1872. It was the world's first journal dedicated to just the lumber industry. As such, Hotchkiss was part of the initial set of lumber writers in America. Hotchkiss became the Gazette's editor in 1875. He was also an editor for The Bay City Journal at intervals from 1871 to 1876.

He went to Chicago in 1877 to work as an assistant editorial writer for the Northwestern Lumberman, where he prepared a Lumberman's Handbook of Inspection and Grading, which sold over 40,000 copies nationwide. (Early lumber journalism often focused on the manufacturing part of the lumber industry.) The Lumberman's Exchange of Chicago, an influential group in the industry, elected Hotchkiss to the position of executive secretary in 1881, a post that he held until 1887. Together with Walter C. Wright, he bought the Lumber Trade Journal in 1887; although Hotchkiss was nominally president and editor of the publication for the next two decades, frequent ill health meant that Wright bore most of the management burden.

== Personal life ==
Hotchkiss married Elizabeth St. John of Ellsworth, Connecticut, on August 18, 1856. They had a son and a daughter. In 1856 Hotchkiss joined and became very involved in the Masonic Order; he served as secretary in two of its chapters and was one of the Order's oldest members in Illinois. He was also a member and recorder of the Knights Templar. Hotchkiss was a Presbyterian and a member of the Second Presbyterian Church in Evanston, Illinois.

== Later life and death ==
Hotchkiss lived the last 48 years of his life in Evanston, Illinois. There he managed the Evanston Press, a weekly publication. A Jeffersonian Democrat throughout his life, during the 1890s he was elected as both a supervisor and a justice of the peace in Evanston, which at the time was a town dominated by the Republican Party. He was secretary of the Illinois Lumber Dealers Association from 1891 to 1918.

He retired a few years after a 78-year career as a lumberman, and has been considered the "father" of lumber periodicals in the lumber world since then. In later life, Hotchkiss was said to be 'the oldest living lumber man' and the 'last of the 49ers'. On August 14, 1921, Hotchkiss, at the age of 90, and his wife celebrated their 65th wedding anniversary at their home in Evanston. He died at the age of 94 on March 1, 1926.

Hotchkiss had gathered at his home the last 16 of the original forty-niners. As a group they vowed to eulogized each other at each successive funeral when one died. Hotchkiss was the last to go and there was no one left to speak for him as he had outlived them all.

One modern scholar assessing Hotchkiss's 1898 work calls it "a classic history of lumbering in the Midwest", while another, in a survey of sources on the history of the lumber industry, says that it "is full of detail, but disjointed" and not as valuable as studies published in the mid-20th century and later.
