= Anthony D'Agostino =

Italian and American marine biologist (1931–2017)

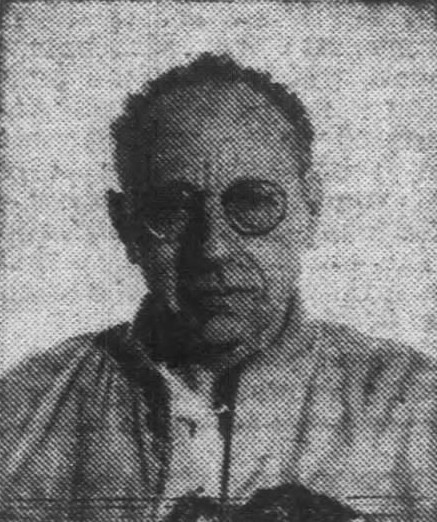
- D'Agostino c. 1985
- Born: 1931
- Died: June 20, 2017 (aged 86); Stony Brook, New York, U.S.
- Education: New York University (PhD)
- Scientific career
- Thesis: Comparative studies of Artemia salina, (Development and Physiology) (1965)

Anthony S. D'Agostino (1931 – June 20, 2017) was an Italian and American marine biologist and carcinologist known for his research on American lobsters and brine shrimp.

== Early life and education ==
Anthony S. D'Agostino was born in 1931. He migrated from his native Sicily to the United States in 1948, when he was 17 years old. He spoke Italian as his first language, and learned English by watching Italian films with English subtitles. D'Agostino studied at New York University, where he earned a bachelor of science, a master's degree, and a doctorate in biology. His 1965 PhD thesis was titled "Comparative studies of Artemia salina (development and physiology)".

== Research ==
=== Brine shrimp ===
D'Agostino collaborated with the toy inventor and White supremacist Harold von Braunhut to develop brine shrimp cysts (marketed by von Braunhut as "Sea-Monkey eggs") which illusively appear to come alive with the addition of tap water and a chemical treatment consisting of salt and chemically formulated nutrition. Von Braunhut had enlisted the help of D'Agostino to develop the treatment, which would transform the tap water into a suitable habitable for the shrimp and thus ensure their longer lifespan. The development process to perfect the treatment took nearly three years, but was successfully finished by the end of the 1960s. They also selectively bred the shrimp so that they would survive being delivered in the postal service, thus creating a new hybrid they called artemia "nyos".

=== American lobsters ===
D'Agostino moved to work at the New York Ocean Science Laboratory (NYOSL) in Montauk in 1970, where he performed research on American lobsters. By 1975, he was the laboratory's senior research scientist in marine biology, looking into the feasibility of raising American lobsters in a controlled environment. His research team began breeding such lobsters with the rare blue coloration to serve as a natural tag for tracking the population and movement of the species. After the government of New York withdrew state funding for NYSOL in 1979, the operations of the lab began winding down, and the only project remaining at NYSOL by February 1981 was the release program. Nevertheless, his program managed to continue the experiment with private funding by January 1982.

Through this experiment, D'Agostino inadvertently realized that the blue variety tended to grow faster than other varieties of lobster, potentially making lobster farms economical. In March 1986, he was featured in The New York Times as "the only scientist in the country to have successfully bred blue lobsters" as part of a "landmark experiment" to discover why they grow quicker than other varieties. By 1988, he was known to have kept at least a hundred blue lobsters for research in the New York Aquarium's labs in Montauk and Brooklyn.

== Later life and death ==
By April 2016, D'Agostino's wife informed The New York Times Magazine that he was seriously ill. D'Agostino died on June 20, 2017, at the age of 86 at Stony Brook University Hospital in Stony Brook, New York.
