= André Fontaine (painter) =

Canadian painter (1926–2005)

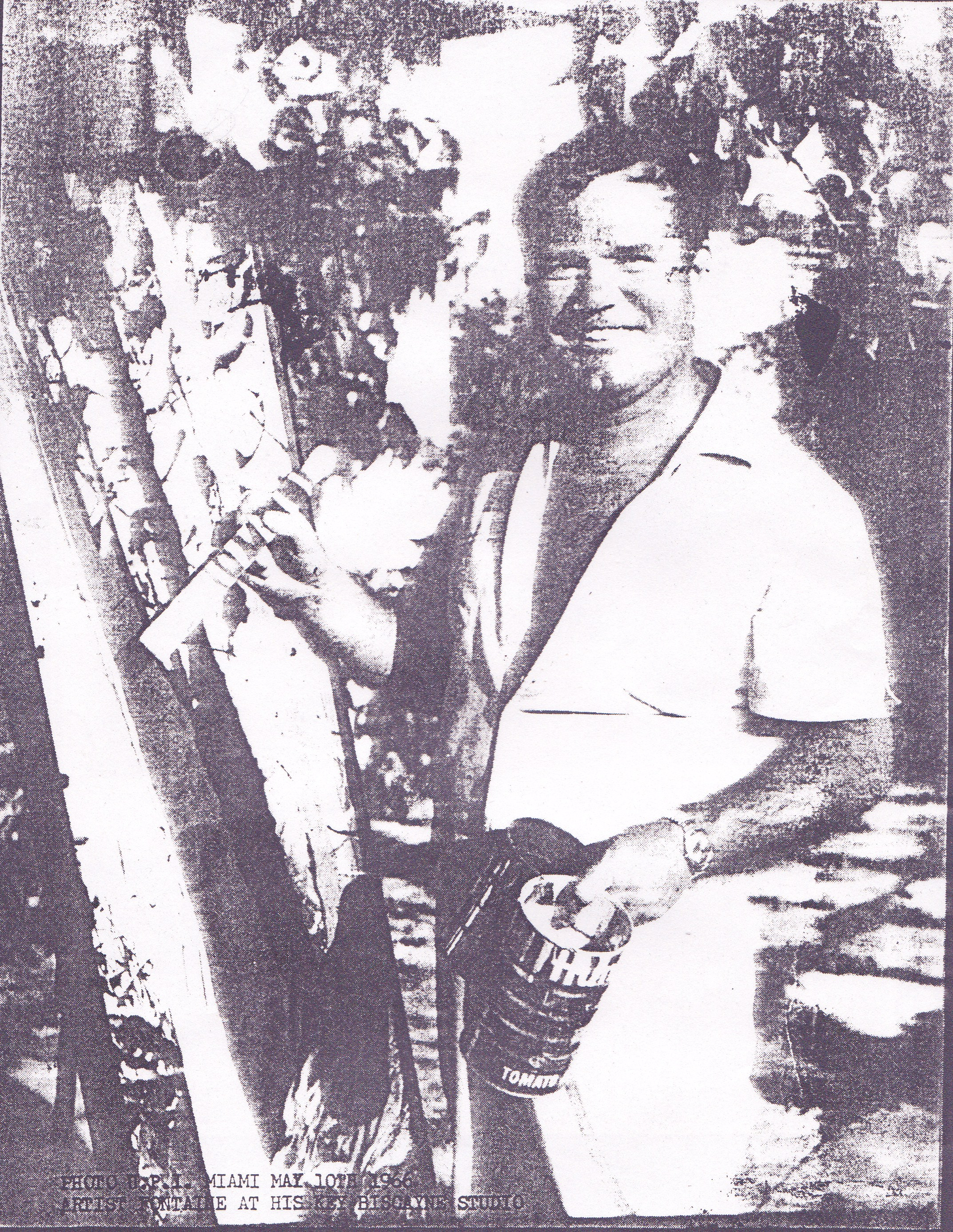
artist Fontaine

André Fontaine (March 6, 1926 – January 30, 2005) was a painter known as "The Painter of the stars" and a newspaper journalist. He founded his movement in painting,(the cosmonitic art), in Quebec, being the first to use fiberglass. He was recognized worldwide and skirted famous names, including Walt Disney who dedicated a Mickey Mouse cartoon published in newspapers around the world.

== Early life and education ==
Andre Fontaine was born on March 6, 1926, in Saint-Gédéon, Quebec, a small village in the Saguenay-Lac-Saint-Jean, a region of Quebec. He studied in Lac-Saint-Jean, then he went to high school at Royal Military College Road Victoria, British Columbia. He obtained master's degrees in psychology and fine arts, and a Ph.D. in cosmology at the University of Florida. To defray his studies, he painted alongside big names such as Jackson Pollock and Jacques Fresco. He married first wife, Marie-Paule Tremblay in Alma, Quebec, in 1945. From this union he had two daughters, Helen was born October 11, 1946, and Pauline was born in 1948. The divorce was formalized in 1966.

== A futurist artist ==
In 1953, Fontaine's work began winning art exhibits. In 1963, the American Academy of Arts and Letters awarded him a medal and a scholarship for his artworks and his research, which included creating a new painting medium he called "texmos". Texmos involved dying brightly colored fiberglass with nylon powder. The new composition gave his paintings a three-dimensional effect. The following year, he won the gold medal of the "American Architectural Association". He later held numerous exhibitions and sold his paintings to major U.S. and foreign personalities. In 1965 Walt Disney immortalised Fontaine in a Mickey Mouse comic published worldwide, in which the nephew of Mickey shows that he got Fontaine's autograph. In 1966, the Wowetco global arts management company took him under contract and his works were exhibited throughout the world. His art became also known as "cosmonitic art". His works are displayed in museums of contemporary art.

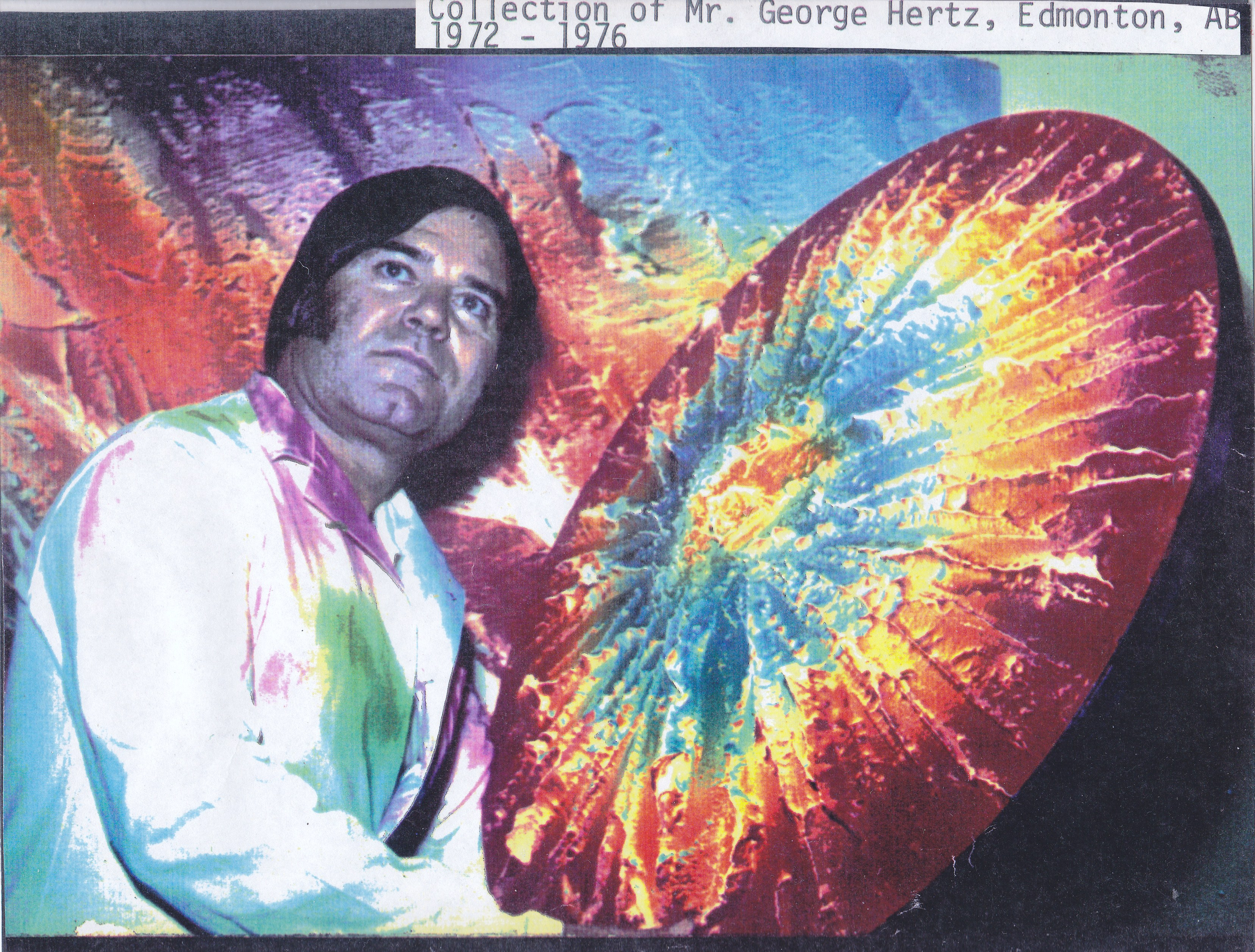
Fontaine and his painting

== International Press journalist ==
Fontaine worked as a freelance journalist, correspondent of the International Press Institute. He worked as a reporter for several agencies including, Radio-Canada, Pathe News, The Saturday Evening Post and International Movietone. He was sent abroad to make feature s, by being present on site during major political events of world history such as: Cuban Revolution, from the mountains of the Sierra Maestra, the crisis of Panama, Dominican civil war, the construction of the Berlin Wall, Christmas 1963, the assassination of U.S. President John F. Kennedy, the Pope's visit to the United Nations. In addition, he has reported on major launches at Cape Kennedy since it opened in 1956.

He was the first Quebec journalist to be a member of La Presse to Cape Canaveral. An exceptional man who touched many areas, he was ordained by the United Church in 1964. A veteran of the World War II (1939–1945), he was wounded on active duty and released in 1947. He also made his military service, United States, National Guard dismissed: lieutenant colonel.

In 1965, Serge Brousseau, famous critical to Le Journal de Montreal Andre Fontaine defined as a "cosmic painter" News "The Painter of the Stars". "Because of his art of avant-garde. In addition, he said, speaking of Fontaine in an article published at the time "you're never a prophet in his country", and Fontaine went into exile outside his native country to be recognized for his art and its creation. He lived several years in the United States within West Indies and Latin America. In 1966, he wanted to disclose facts about the assassination of John F. Kennedy, as certain revelations were disturbing to some people, they wanted his silence.

== Between the shade and light ==
In 1977, Fontaine out of the shadows, after some difficult years, where he was like " out" from the living world for political reasons. He published a book co-written with Carmen Morin to tell the whole truth about the story. In 1977, began another life, very different and opens his art studio in Quebec. He had just published the book Conspiracy which, by its embarrassing revelations, was considered to index a book which was withdrawn from the market. That year, he met a young artist, Joan Doyon, who works at the studio to teach painting to children. Both artists have developed a beautiful partnership working, so the following year, 1978 he proposed a bold plan to open an art gallery together. Fountaine Art Gallery opened in Quebec on 56, rue St-Pierre. Due to the inplication artists with good causes, which offer courses to underprivileged youth, this was the first art gallery offering art classes and professionals to receive a government grant, which was led by René Lévesque.

In December 1979, Andre Fontaine married for the second time. His wife was Joan Doyon. They had a daughter, Rachel, born in September 1980. Union that lasted over 25 years until his death.

During the 1980s he organized 90 exhibitions of his paintings in the regions of Quebec and also gives occasional concerts of classical singing, which sometimes for weddings or the holidays. Another facet of Fountain, is the benefactor of the holiday season, which was recovering beignets, muffins restaurant before closing in order to move the bring centers of charity for the poor. Being a man of action, he remained active in various fields in addition to his paintings: He was a speaker at academic conferences, a tenor opera singer who gave concerts in churches, guests in TV shows to talk about his art. Fontaine died on January 30, 2005, following a myocardial infarction at the Hospital Saint-François d'Assise in Québec.

== Works ==
=== Reports ===
- The Cuban Revolution, depuis les montagnes de la Sierra Maestra
- The crisis of Panama
- The Dominican civil war
- the Cyprus crisis
- The assassination of US President John F. Kennedy
- The construction of the Berlin Wall
- the arrival of Pope Paul VI at the United Nations in 1965

=== Exhibitions ===
- 1964: at a public Art show in the Miami Science Museum
- 1964: June 24 to July 3, 1964, Fontaine exhibit his painting at the art Gallery "Galerie Martin" (for the first time in Canada)
- 1964: in October at the inn "le Toit de Chaume"
- 1965: in June, at the Festival of the Arts of the White House in Washington, his work "meeting"
- 1965: in October, French arts Gallery in Montréal
- 1966: at the Mayfair art gallery in Miami (thême) the cosmos and mysteries of the universe
- 1966: May to July in Montreal
- 1969: in May, at the "Maison des Arts de Chicoutimi "
- 1969: September 11 to 18 at the cultural center of Cowansville
- 1971: May 23 to June 27 at the "Maison des Arts de Chicoutimi"
- 1972: in December, Edmonton, in McCauley Plaza, Jasper Ave. : Show "creation"
- 1973: at the third international IRPA congress
- 1973: in July, at the Dallas Times herald Gallery,
- 1975: in a free gallery, Beyrouth Liban
- 1978: in May, the innoguration the wall at school François Perrault, Ste Foy
- 1978: Exhibition "the challenge to the stars"
- 1980: February 17 to March 20 à l'Atelier 858, Montréal
- 1981: April 9 to 19 at the mall, Place Lebourgneuf at Québec city
- 1983: in Drummondville in the auditorium "powder keg", conference on UFOs and exhibition Canvas
- 1986: December December 3 to 5 in the Beauce
- 1987: in June at the mall, Place Ste Foy of the Quebec city
- 1987: August 31 at St Nicholas
- 1987: December 2 to 6 Downtown
- 1988: exhibition at the crossroads Beauport November 3 to 6
- 1989: October 10 to 14 at the mall the galleries of Trois Pistoles
- 1990: 1991 exhibition at Gallery Sir Wilfrid Hamel, Quebec
- 1992: exhibition in Montreal
- 1995: December 8 to 17 YWCA, Holland Hall Devonshire Quebec
- 1996: exhibition at Place Ste-Foy, Quebec
- 1999: from July 22 to August 5: The Casket Library, Library of Lac Beauport
- 2002: from June 15 to 30, 2002; the Casket Gallery, Library of Lac Beauport

=== Milestones ===
- In 1953: his works are winning for the first time on the International Pan, among about 500 other works on display.
- In 1960: he opened art gallery at Place Ville-Marie in Montreal.
- In 1963: "American Academy of Arts and Letters" attribute to him the second medal and a cash prize of $5,000 for his creations and his research.
- In 1964: "The American Association archictural" he was awarded the gold medal.
- In 1965: Walt Disney makes him immortal by creating a comic of Mickey Mouse which was published throughout the world, in which Mickey's nephew to have the sale autograph Fontaine.
- In 1977: publication of the book "Conspiracy – between light and shadow", signed Carmen Morin.
- In 1978: he opened an art gallery on St-Pierre street, in Québec: "Fountain Gallery Inc..."
- In 1978: April 3, 1978, inauguration of the mural "The man and the universe" (24 'x 8'), done at the school-Francois Perreault of Quebec
- In 1991: large mural painted on the facade of a building in Saint-Roch (Quebec) | Saint Roch
