= X-ray specs =

Novelty eyewear

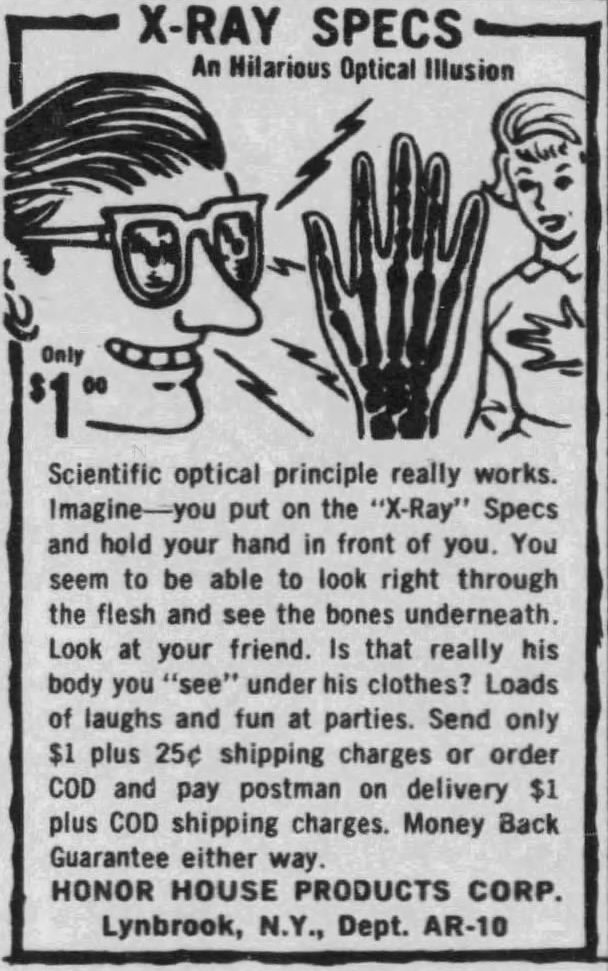
A 1964 advertisement for X-ray specs that falsely promises the ability to see through skin and clothing

X-ray specs or X-ray glasses are an American novelty item, purported to allow users to see through or into solid objects. In reality, the spectacles merely create an optical illusion; no X-rays are involved. The current paper version is sold under the name "X-Ray Spex"; a similar product is sold under the name "X-Ray Gogs".

== Description ==
X-Ray Specs consist of an over-sized pair of spectacles with plastic or cardboard frames and white cardboard "lenses" printed with concentric red circles and emblazoned with the legend "X-RAY VISION".

The "lenses" consist of two layers of thin cardboard with a small hole about a quarter-inch (6 millimeters) in diameter punched through both layers. The user views objects through the holes. In the original version, a feather is embedded between the layers of each lens. The vanes of the feathers are so close together that light is diffracted, causing the user to receive two slightly offset images. For instance, if viewing a pencil, one would see two offset images of the pencil. Where the images overlap, a darker image is obtained, giving the illusion that one is seeing the graphite embedded within the body of the pencil. Newer versions utilize manufactured diffraction lenses instead of feathers.

X-Ray Specs were patented by Harold von Braunhut, also the inventor of Amazing Sea-Monkeys.

== See also ==
- X-ray vision
- Night vision goggles
