= Harold von Braunhut =

American toy inventor (1926–2003)

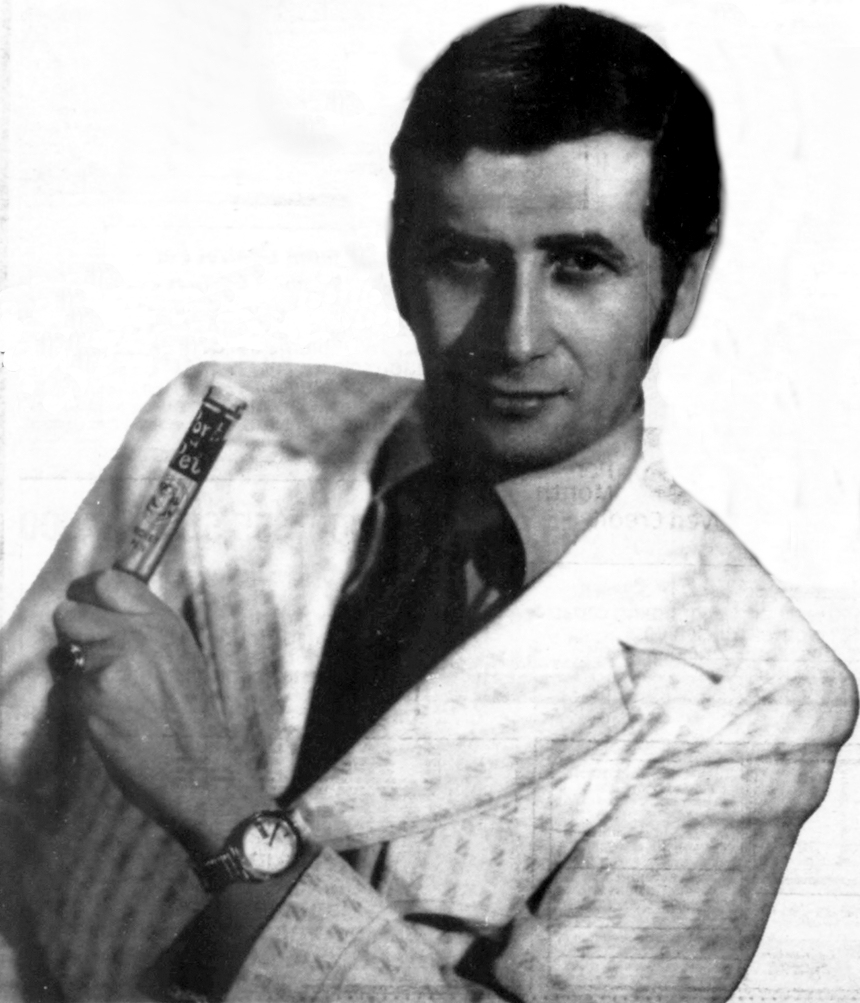
- Promotional photograph by James J. Kriegsmann
- Born: Harold Nathan Braunhut; March 31, 1926; Memphis, Tennessee, U.S.
- Died: November 28, 2003 (aged 77); Indian Head, Maryland, U.S.
- Other name: Hendrik von Braun
- Occupations: Marketer, inventor
- Organization(s): Aryan Nations; Ku Klux Klan
- Known for: Sea-Monkeys; X-ray specs
- Spouses: Charlotte Judelshon (m. 1955; div. 1968) Yolanda Signorelli (m. 1980)
- Children: 2

Harold von Braunhut (Note: In this German name, the surname is von Braunhut, not Braunhut.) (born Harold Nathan Braunhut; March 31, 1926 – November 28, 2003), also known as Hendrik von Braun, was an American mail-order marketer, inventor, and white supremacist. He was most famous as the creator and seller of novelty products marketed towards children such as Sea-Monkeys.

Von Braunhut held 195 patents. His products were regularly and aggressively marketed in comic books; they were often misleadingly advertised. Products he marketed included Amazing Hair-Raising Monsters, Crazy Crabs, and Invisible Goldfish. Some of his most well-known inventions were the X-ray specs, glasses which create an optical distortion, but which were falsely marketed as letting wearers see through flesh and clothes, and Sea-Monkeys, which were brine shrimp, but were advertised as humanoid figures; Sea-Monkeys became very popular and sold well, though von Braunhut was at one point sued over their marketing.

Von Braunhut also gained notoriety for his racial and political views. Despite his Jewish upbringing, he was closely associated with white supremacist and neo-Nazi groups; he was a member of both the Ku Klux Klan and the Aryan Nations, and was a priest in and the Maryland leader of the Aryan Nations. In 1984, he was listed among a group of "outstanding Aryan nationalist leaders" at an Aryan Nations congress. In 1988, both his involvement with the white supremacist movement and his Jewish heritage were publicized. Despite this, von Braunhut continued to be involved in the white supremacist movement.

== Early life ==
Harold Nathan Braunhut was born in Memphis, Tennessee, on March 31, 1926, to Jeanette Cohen and Edward Braunhut. His father owned a printing shop, while his mother's family worked in the toy business. He had one brother, Bernard. His family was Jewish, and Braunhut was raised religiously Jewish. He received a bar mitzvah.

Braunhut's family moved to New York City in 1931, where he grew up. He attended P.S. 26 high school in New York. Braunhut attended the City University of New York, then Columbia University from 1945 to 1946, but did not graduate. Braunhut married Charlotte Judelshon in 1955, with whom he had a son. They divorced in 1968. His mother was killed in a car accident in 1960.

== Career ==
Braunhut began his career as a talent manager for novelty acts. He managed a showman (Henry Lamore or Henri LaMothe) whose act consisted of diving 40 feet (12 m) into a children's wading pool filled with only 1 foot (0.30 m) of water, and the mentalist The Amazing Dunninger. Braunhut also raced motorcycles and cars under the name "The Green Hornet", and was for a time a television producer.

He added "von" to his name sometime in the 1950s for a more "Germanic" sound. He went on to became an inventor that decade; he used an aggressive comic book advertising campaign to sell an assortment of products, many of which were misleadingly advertised. His business ventures earned him millions of dollars, though he was known as "not easy to work with".

He began dating Yolanda Signorelli, who was then in show business, shortly after he divorced his first wife. They met while she was in the audience of a television program he was taping for Dunninger; she went to work for him and with him on many of his business ventures. They were married 12 years later on February 14, 1980, as part of a mass wedding at the Manhattan Playboy Club. The Playboy Club had advertised a competition where the winners would get a free wedding ceremony and honeymoon; the entrants were asked to write in a brief message about why they wanted to be married. Signorelli and von Braunhut were noted as having a particularly elaborate response; Signorelli had tried to convince von Braunhut to marry her for several years, and he agreed to if they won the contest. They had a daughter.

=== Sea-Monkeys ===
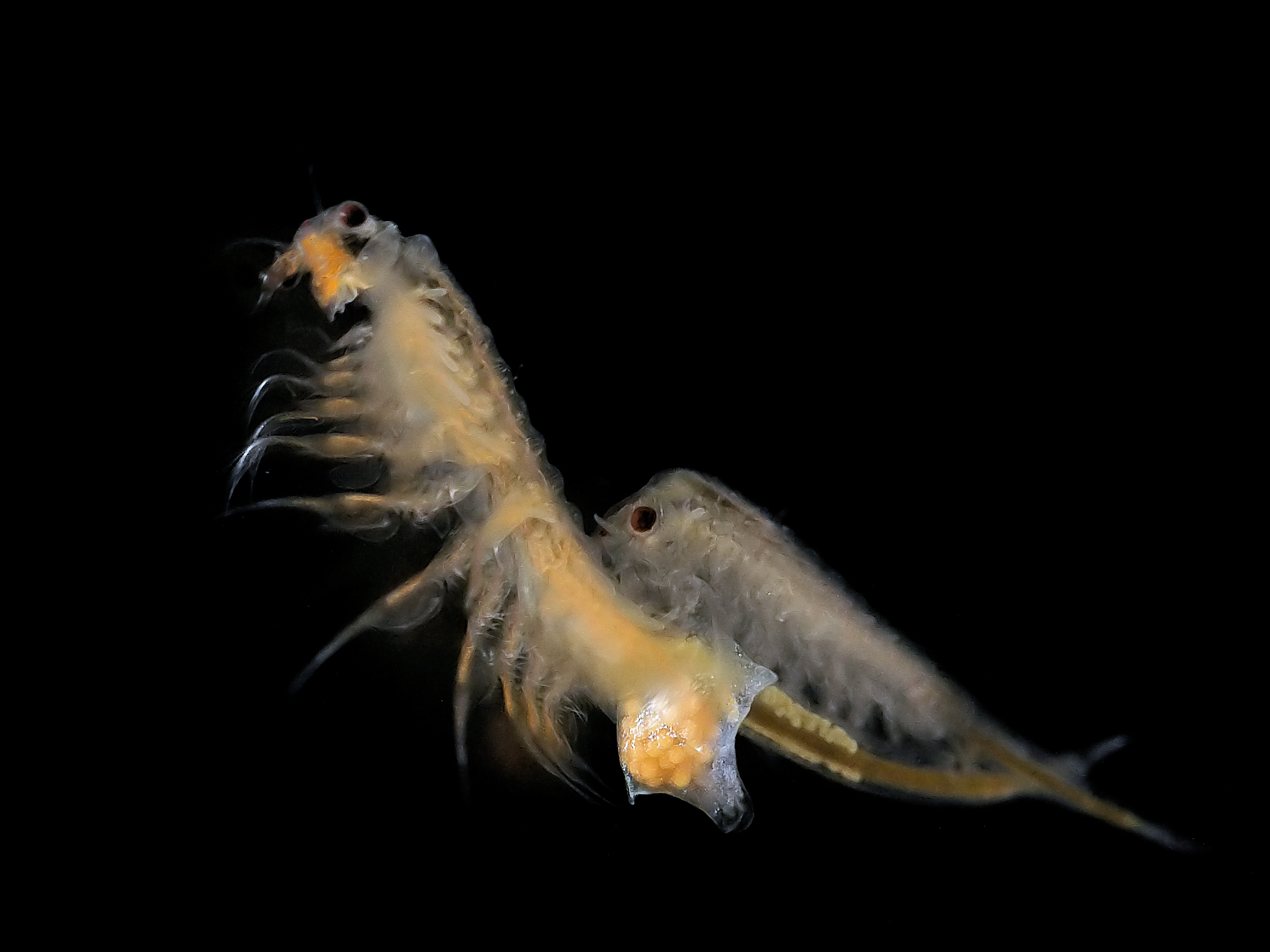
Brine shrimp, which von Braunhut famously marketed as "Sea-Monkeys"

His most famous creation was Sea-Monkeys, which were tiny brine shrimp eggs that "came to life" when water was added. The idea to sell brine shrimp as pets occurred to him in 1957; the exact story of while he was in a pet store and saw brine shrimp sold as pet food, or alternatively saw a fisherman using them as bait. He was interested by their ability to spring back to life in the presence of water after a period of dormancy.

He began marketing them through his company Transcience Corporation 1960 as "Instant Life", advertised almost entirely in comic books; they were not initially a success. In 1962, he renamed the product "Sea-Monkeys", which improved sales. Working with the marine biologist Anthony D'Agostino, together they selectively bred a hybrid variety of shrimp to be more appropriate for being pets, larger and hardier. It was sold with three parts: "Sea-Monkey Water-Purifier", "Instant Life Sea-Monkey Eggs", and "Sea-Monkey Growth Food".

Comic book advertisements for the Sea-Monkeys showed them as cartoon humanoid figures, not shrimp, and boasted of their abilities, saying they could be trained, be hypnotized, and race. Alongside the brine shrimp, he sold several accessories for the Sea-Monkeys, such as toys, aphrodisiacs, Sea-Monkey vitamins, a plastic aquarium, a circus, and an underwater racetrack. He wrote the Official Sea-Monkey Handbook, where Braunhut told fantastical tales of what he claimed the Sea-Monkeys were actually doing. Von Braunhut was once sued over the product allegedly being fraudulent due to misleading marketing, but won the suit. Billions of Sea-Monkeys were sold and they garnered generated fan websites, a television series, and a video game. Astronaut John Glenn took 400 million of them into space with him in 1998.

=== Other inventions and environmentalism ===
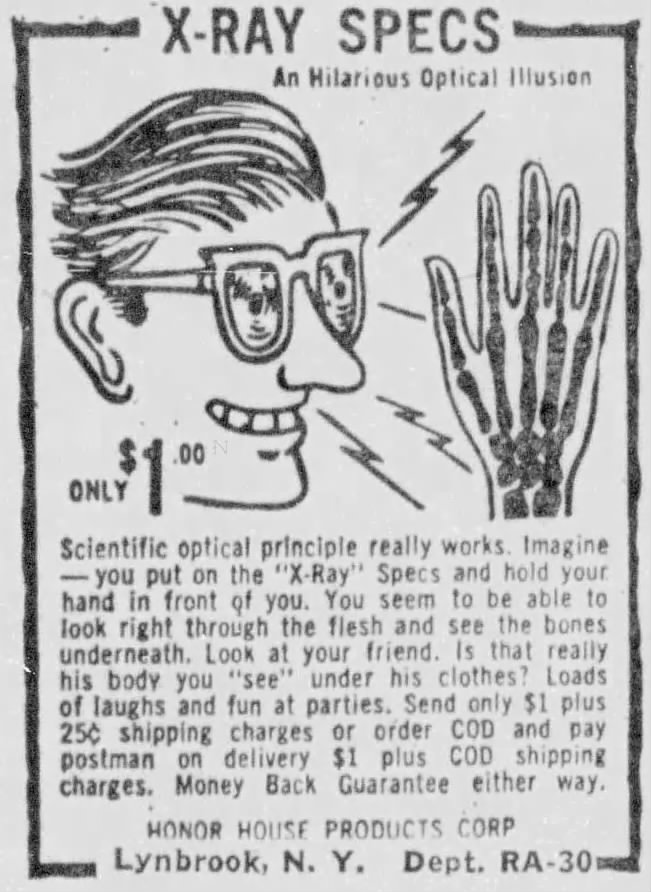
A 1964 advertisement for X-ray specs that falsely promises the ability to see through flesh and clothing

Von Braunhut held 195 patents and various products he created have become cultural icons. Among other products, he created Amazing Hair-Raising Monsters, Invisible Goldfish (which actually was goldfish supplies and an empty bowl with no fish), and Crazy Crabs, which were simply hermit crabs in a box. He created the X-ray specs, glasses with grooved lenses that create an optical effect. Advertisements for the X-ray specs falsely claimed they enabled the wearer to see through clothing and flesh.

He later created the Kiyoga, a weapon; it had a coiled metal whip contained within. In 1979, he was arrested on weapons charges for carrying this device, but was let go after the judge determined the weapon did not require a license. Von Braunhut thereafter said it was for "if you need a gun but can't get a license"; it was advertised in the right-wing paper The Spotlight. Advertisements claimed it could send robbers "howling in unbelievable pain". He also created a variety of bulletproof clothing.

Von Braunhut moved from New York City to Bryans Road, Maryland, in 1985. He set up a wildlife conservation area in Maryland, the Montrose Wildlife Sanctuary. When this became threatened by a new proposed development in the area, von Braunhut became a leader of and the spokesman for a group called SWORD (Save Wildlife, Oppose Riviera Development), which protested the development. He declared his intention to market lobsters as pets in 1989, which he was apparently still working on by the time of his death.

== White supremacy ==
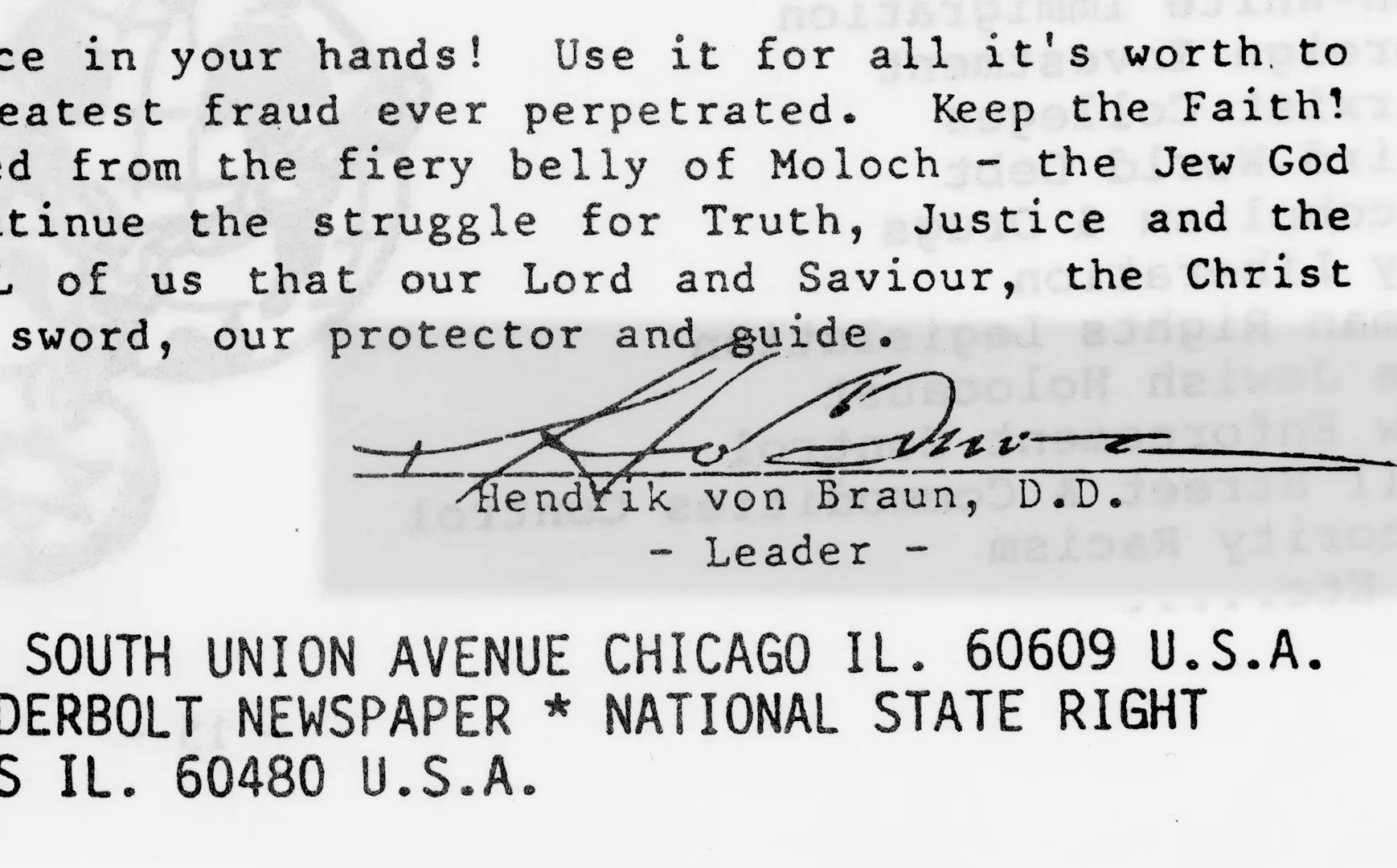
Excerpt from a message by Braunhut (signing as Hendrik von Braun) published in his newsletter, 1987

Von Braunhut had a close association with white supremacist and neo-Nazi groups. His activities were monitored by the Anti-Defamation League (ADL); the ADL said von Braunhut was "linked to some of the most extreme racist and anti-Semitic organizations in the country"; FBI agent Mike German described him as "one of the elder statesmen of the white supremacist movement". In his study, he displayed fascist materials, including an inscribed image of Benito Mussolini and a poster signed by Hermann Göring.

He sometimes went by Hendrik von Braun for these activities; he also operated an organization calling itself the "National Anti-Zionist Institute" from the same Bryans Road, Maryland address that von Braunhut used to sell Sea Monkey merchandise. He distributed an anti-Zionist and white supremacist newsletter. Additionally, he was the leader of a group called the "Imperial Order of the Black Eagle", which was based in New York and operated in the early 1980s; it had its own newsletter.

According to a business associate, von Braunhut once declared to him that: "Hitler wasn’t a bad guy. He just received bad press." He regularly attended the Aryan Nations (AN) annual conference, where he was at times a featured speaker, also given the honor of lighting the burning cross. In 1984, he was listed among a group of "outstanding Aryan nationalist leaders" at an Aryan Nations congress. He was a member of the Knights of the Ku Klux Klan in the early 1980s, and bought firearms for an Ohio Ku Klux Klan faction. He was allegedly friends with Grand Dragon Dale R. Reusch. He was close friends with Richard Girnt Butler, the leader of AN, and was the Aryan Nations leader in Maryland. He spoke in the place of Butler in a February 1988 meeting on repealing the Fourteenth Amendment.

=== Reveal of involvement ===
Von Braunhut's involvement in white supremacy was publicized in 1988. This came after Butler, in one of his fundraising letters, encouraged his followers to buy the weapon, and noted that the manufacturer of the Kiyoga supported him financially, with a portion of sales proceeds from the Kiyoga going to Butler; at the time, Butler was facing federal charges for sedition, though he was later acquitted. Journalists connected this to von Braunhut. Soon after, Butler confirmed this, describing von Braunhut as a longtime supporter and "Aryan", and that Braunhut was "a whiteman who believes in love of God and believes another white man should have a chance at justice". This was further publicized in a story that year from The Washington Post, which probed at more of his white supremacist connections. This piece also, sourced from his relatives, revealed that he was Jewish. This shocked and disappointed many neo-Nazis, though rumors about him being Jewish had been around for years; many had figured he was, and simply did not care.

After the publicity, he continued to be involved in the white supremacist movement and continued to be accepted by the Aryan Nations as an ordained priest in the movement. Von Braunhut said in response to the reports of both his ethnicity and his political views that: "I will not make any statements whatsoever". Many journalists attempted to discuss with him his status as a Jewish neo-Nazi; he refused for years and hung up on reporters who asked. He generally refused to discuss his ideology or background with journalists. In a 1988 interview with The Seattle Times, he remarked about the "inscrutable, slanty Korean eyes" of Korean shop owners, complained about Martin Luther King Jr., and said, "You know what side I'm on. I don't make any bones about it." In a 1989 interview with the Financial Times of Canada, he again refused to discuss the issue, saying "I am saying nothing [...] If you want to prove anything, you go out and prove it", though did admit to providing financial assistance to Aryan Nations and discussed his plans for pet lobsters. His wife did not agree with his political views, but after his death, said that they had "never really talked about things like that" and that they "just really loved each other, and I didn’t question him or interrogate him".

In 1993, he advised young white supremacists against adopting the skinhead aesthetic and instead argued they should infiltrate mainstream protest movements. In 1995, von Braunhut presided over the Aryan Nations funeral of Butler's wife. The same year, he again attended the Aryan World Congress, where he was a speaker; he praised Jesus for having the "wisdom to empower the white race with the creativity of every material benefit you now enjoy". In response to von Braunhut's views, two companies cancelled their Sea-Monkey distributions; a Sea-Monkeys business representative stated that this was for business reasons, unrelated to his views. When the license was bought in 1995, von Braunhut claimed he would cease public political activity.

== Death and legacy ==
Von Braunhut died after falling on November 28, 2003, at his home in Indian Head, Maryland, aged 77. Following his death, there was a legal battle over Sea-Monkey ownership rights between his widow Yolanda Signorelli and Sam Harwell, CEO of a toy company that von Braunhut had licensed out parts of the product to.

Von Braunhut was the subject of Just Add Water (2016), a short documentary by Great Big Story and CNN Films. He was also parodically portrayed by Thomas Lennon in the comedy film Unfrosted (2024) as a German "taste pilot" with a Nazi past reminiscent of Wernher von Braun.

== Further resources ==
- Lane, Penny (December 28, 2016). Just Add Water: The Story of the Amazing Lives of Sea Monkeys (Video). Great Big Story; CNN Films. Archived from the original on December 29, 2016 – via YouTube.
- Walsh, Tim (2005). "Sea-Monkeys". Timeless Toys: Classic Toys and the Playmakers Who Created Them. Andrews McMeel Publishing. pp. 127–129. ISBN 978-0-7407-5571-2.
