= Jerome J. Murif =

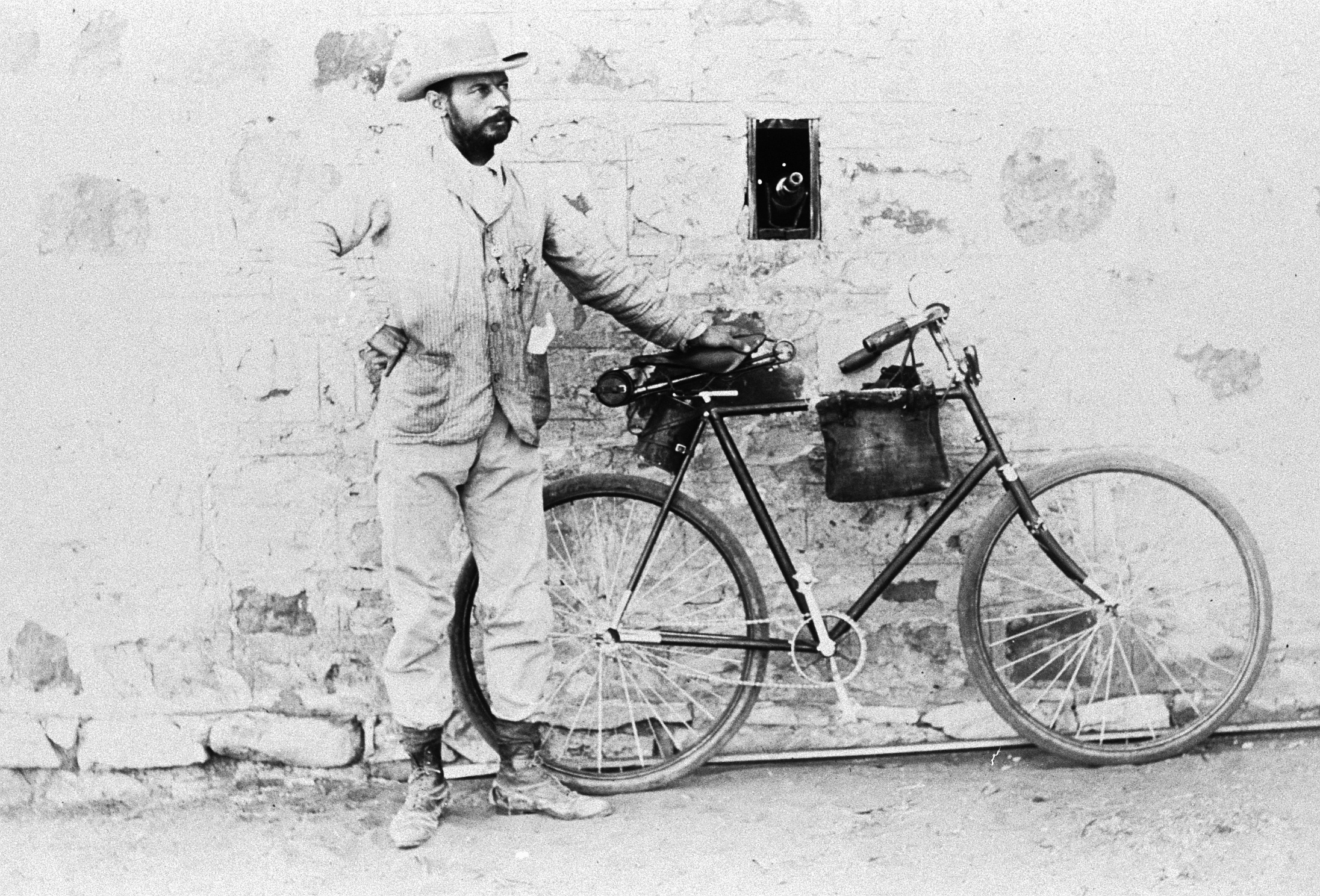
- Born: 1863
- Died: 19 March 1926 (aged 62–63); Colma, San Mateo, California, United States
- Citizenship: Irish? Australian?
- Occupation: engineer
- Writing career
- Genre: travel

Jerome Joseph Murif (1863–1926) was an Irish-Australian engineer and bushman who was also the first man to cycle across the Australian continent, from South to North, Glenelg, a suburb of Adelaide to Darwin, in 1897. Murif's surname at birth is unknown (possibly Murphy). In Australia, he used the spelling "Murif", but after emigrating to the US in 1903, he adopted the spelling "Muriff". No contemporary records of the surname Murif or Muriff in Ireland exist at the period of his birth.

Murif is believed to have been born in Ireland in about 1863. He appears to have arrived in Australia in about 1883. The first record of him, so far located, places him as the holder (with others) of the ABC Claim, near Waukaringa in South Australia in 1888. He later was recorded as an engine driver at the Stephens Creek reservoir of the Broken Hill Water Supply. Elsewhere there are suggestions that he was a pipe layer for the waterworks. Murif wrote occasional sketches that were published in the Barrier Miner newspaper in Broken Hill.

A declaration prepared by him, after his Trans Australia journey describes him as Engineer, certificated by the Adelaide Marine Board.

Aged 34, he took 74 days to complete his journey to Palmerston and Port Darwin. Murif describes a quite clinical process of investigating various records before hitting upon the bicycle crossing of Australia from South to North and selecting the appropriate bicycle, eschewing advertising and painting over the brand-name of the Wertheim Electra bicycle and labelling it Diamond.

He then went on to write about his travel in the book From Ocean to Ocean, published the same year by George Robertson and Co in Sydney. He specifically avoids referencing the names of people he met during his journey, but mentions meeting a young white boy with two aborigines near Dalhousie Station, almost certainly Essington Lewis, later General Manager and managing director of BHP. Essington Lewis was sent to work on the family property Dalhousie during school breaks from 1896 to 1899. There is claimed to be a letter from Murif to Essington Lewis in 1898 amongst Lewis's papers.

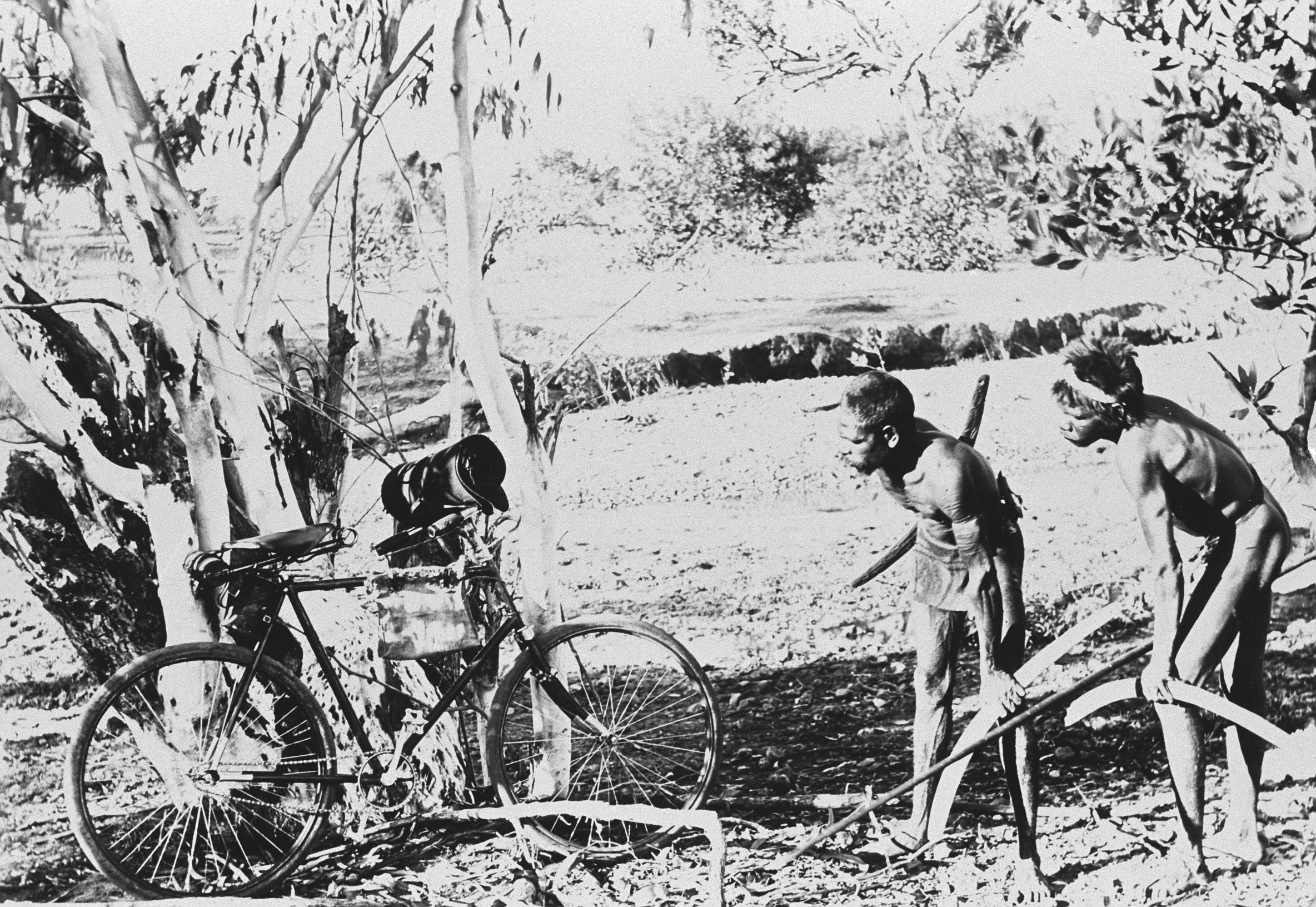
Murif's bicycle being inspected by aborigines

He held mineral leases in New South Wales from approximately 1898 to 1902.

He moved from Australia to the United States, leaving Sydney for San Francisco on the steamer SS Ventura. He arrived on 24 March 1903, when he was described as having US$500. He was recorded as living in a boarding house in that city on the census date of 1 January 1920, when he was shown as 65 years old Male, White, Unmarried, born in England and working for a third party.

Whilst living in San Francisco, he sought copyright on a musical composition.

Murif died in San Mateo, California on 19 March 1926.

== Bibliography ==
- From Ocean To Ocean (1897), George Robertson and Co, republished 2017 (Haere)
