= Jacques Robert Fresco =

American biochemist (1928–2021)

Jacques Robert Fresco (May 30, 1928 - December 5, 2021) was an American biochemist.

Fresco earned a dual chemistry and biology bachelor's degree from New York University, completed a master's degree in biology followed by a doctorate in biochemistry. Prior to joining the Princeton University faculty in 1960, he worked for the American Heart Association. Fresco was awarded a Guggenheim Fellowship in 1968, and retired from Princeton as Damon B. Pfeiffer Professor in the Life Sciences, Emeritus. He was nominated for a Noble Prize for his discoveries in RNA sequencing.
