= The Amazing Live Sea Monkeys =

American TV comedy series

- Genre: Sitcom
- Created by: Howie Mandel
- Starring: Rob LaBelle; Peter Pitofsky; Sean Whalen; Howie Mandel
- Country of origin: United States
- Original language: English
- No. of seasons: 1
- No. of episodes: 11

Production
- Production companies: Chiodo Bros. Productions; Terry's Creations, Inc. Some Assembly Required, Inc. MTM Enterprises

Original release
- Network: CBS
- Release: September 19 – November 28, 1992

The Amazing Live Sea Monkeys is a live action television series that aired for eleven episodes from September 19 to November 28, 1992. It focuses on three microscopic Sea-Monkeys – Dave (Rob LaBelle), Bill (Peter Pitofsky) and Aquarius (Sean Whalen) – who have been enlarged to human size by their benefactor, the Professor (Howie Mandel). Special guests include Stephen Furst, Gilbert Gottfried, Larry Melman, and Vernon Wells.

The series was produced and distributed by MTM Enterprises (now 20th Television).

== Creation ==
The concept of the show derived from the Sea Monkeys product, created in 1957 by Harold von Braunhut and marketed in the 1970s with a series of comic book ads designed and illustrated by Joe Orlando, later Vice President of DC Comics and Associate Publisher of Mad. Howie Mandel got the idea for the show after his daughter wanted to get some brine shrimp pets known as Sea Monkeys, which he also had as a child.

Mandel then decided that "This could be bigger than the Ninja Turtles." He contacted the Chiodo Brothers; the show was then picked up, and produced as a series by CBS. The series aired in the United States and Australia. The character designs derive from the fantasy characters in the ads that Orlando drew for Harold von Braunhut, creator of the product.

== Plot ==
The plot revolved around the notion that the Professor had accidentally enlarged three sea monkeys to human size, and plotlines followed their ensuing comical ineptness in the world. Each Sea Monkey displayed a certain odd character trait: Aquarius could not keep a secret, Bill was afraid of Imperial style beards, and Dave would grow excited at the sound of polka music.

They occasionally come into contact with their next door neighbors, the Brentwoods, whose daughter Sheila (Eliza Schneider) becomes the Sea-Monkeys' best friend. After the show's cancellation, it was replaced by Beakman's World, with Schneider playing the lead female role in that series as well.

== Episode list ==
#	Title	Original airdate
01	"Octapotomus R' Usamus"	19 September 1992
02	"Lighthouse Alone"	26 September 1992
03	"Swampthingamajig"	3 October 1992
04	"Look, Don't Touch"	10 October 1992
05	"Sea Monkey of Love"	17 October 1992
06	"Wrestlemania"	24 October 1992
07	"Haunted Lighthouse"	31 October 1992
08	"Scout's Honor"	7 November 1992
09	"Top Secret"	14 November 1992
10	"Talent Show"	21 November 1992
11	"Teacher's Pests"	28 November 1992

== Broadcasts ==
- United States
  - CBS (1992–1993)
- Canada
  - YTV (1992–1996)
- United Kingdom
  - The Children's Channel (1994–1996)
- Australia
  - ABC (1996–1998)
