= Ibrāhīm Sakjahā =

Jordanian journalist

- Born: 1926; Yaffa
- Died: 1991 (aged 66); Amman

Ibrāhīm Sakjahā (Arabic: إبراهيم سكجها ) (1991–1926) was the leader of the Jordanian journalists. He chaired two newspapers (The Belief) (Al Rai) and (The Constitution) (Al Dustour); moreover he founded two Jordanian newspapers (The People) (Al Sha'ab) and (The Statement) (Al Bayan) newspaper.

== Biography ==
Sakjahā was born in Jaffa on March 13, 1926. He started working at the age of fourteen to help support his family after his father's death in 1940. He studied at secondary school at Al-Amriya School in Jaffa.

He worked as an administrative employee in the newspaper (Palestine) and at the time was writing several articles in the same newspaper under the pseudonym (Al-Adnani Al-Saghir). In 1964, he became an editorial secretary. Sakjahā immigrated to Cairo with the Palestinian emigration in 1984. And worked there for (Rose Al-Youssef) magazine, (Al-Defaa newspaper), and (Al-Hilal house), before moving to Amman in 1949. Later, he worked as an editorial secretary for (Al-Nisr) newspaper, and (Al-Jazeera newspaper). Then, in 1953 he was elected to be a member of the board of the Jordanian Journalists Syndicate. And was elected for three consecutive terms as a captain. He released his first collection of stories called (Photos generated in Jaffa)( Sowar mobtadaha fee yaf'aa)

In 1950, Sakjahā was in charge of editing the (Latest news) (Akher Khabar), but the newspaper was shut down by a government ruling after its publication by three editions. He returned to Jerusalem to work in (Palestine) newspaper as an editing secretary for sixteen years, before returning to Amman in year 1967. In 1987, he traveled to the United Arab Emirates, Dubai to establish Al Bayan newspaper which he edited for two years. Returned to Amman to become the chief editor of (Opinion) (Al Ra’i), (Voice of the People) (Sawt Al Shaab), and (The constitution) (Al Dustour) newspapers until 1988.

== Publications ==
- (First Pictures from Jaffa), short stories, Ministry of Culture, Amman, 1982

== Death ==
Ibrāhīm Sakjahā died on 28 July 1991 in Amman at the age of sixty-six years old.
