= Northwestern Lumberman =

American trade magazine

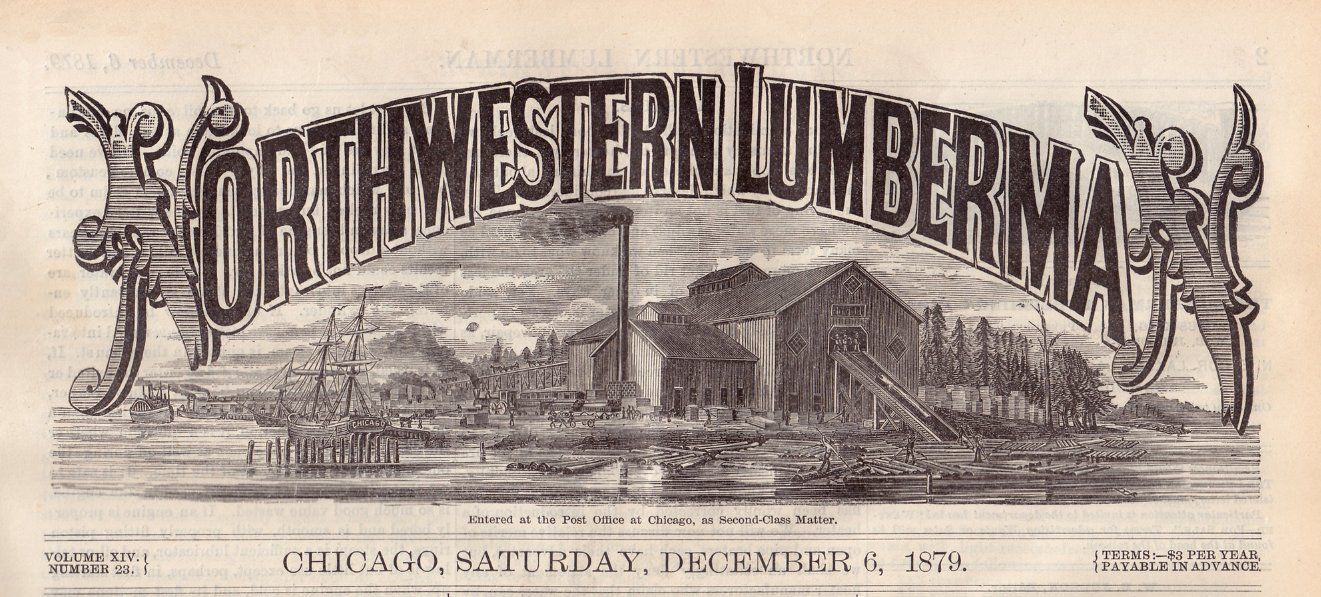
- Volume XIV Number 23
- Categories: Trade magazine
- Frequency: Monthly
- Total circulation: 30,000
- First issue: January 1874; 152 years ago
- Final issue: 1899
- Country: United States
- Based in: Chicago
- Language: English

The Northwestern Lumberman was a nineteenth-century American monthly trade magazine devoted to the lumber industry. It was the first lumber trade paper in America. Over the years it grew in size and scope, with several name changes, and still exists today.

== History ==
The magazine was first published in Bay City, Michigan, in 1872 as the first lumber trade paper in America, called the Lumbermen's Gazette. It was first established by William B Judson. He moved to Grand Rapids, Michigan, in 1873 and changed the name to the Michigan Lumberman for volume 1. There was one issue of the journal printed in Grand Rapids. The publishing company then moved to Muskegon, Michigan and published the next eleven issues of the volume.

The second volume began publication in January 1874 at Chicago. The name was then changed from the Michigan Lumberman to the Northwestern Lumberman. The publisher of the magazine was incorporated in 1877 as the Lumberman Publishing Company and worked under a charter until 1880. The charter was then disbanded and the publication was continued as a private enterprise. The magazine had several works associated with it, among which were the Lumberman's Hand Book, the Pocket Reference Book, and the Lumberman's Telegraphic Code. The magazine had a subscription list of about 25,000 and sold an additional 5,000 copies over the counter.

The originally monthly magazine form published in 1873 through 1875 of eight to twelve pages was changed in 1876 to a sixteen-page weekly periodical. It since expanded further in the 1880s and 1890s to a size varying from 52 to 64 pages. The magazine was sold mostly through the United States while some subscriptions were sold throughout the world.

The Northwestern Lumberman and The Timberman magazines merged on January 1, 1899, into one publication known as the American Lumberman. The magazine then became Building Materials Merchandiser in 1961 and in 1972 became Home Center magazine, which still exists.
