= Sea-Monkeys =

Brine shrimp sold as pets

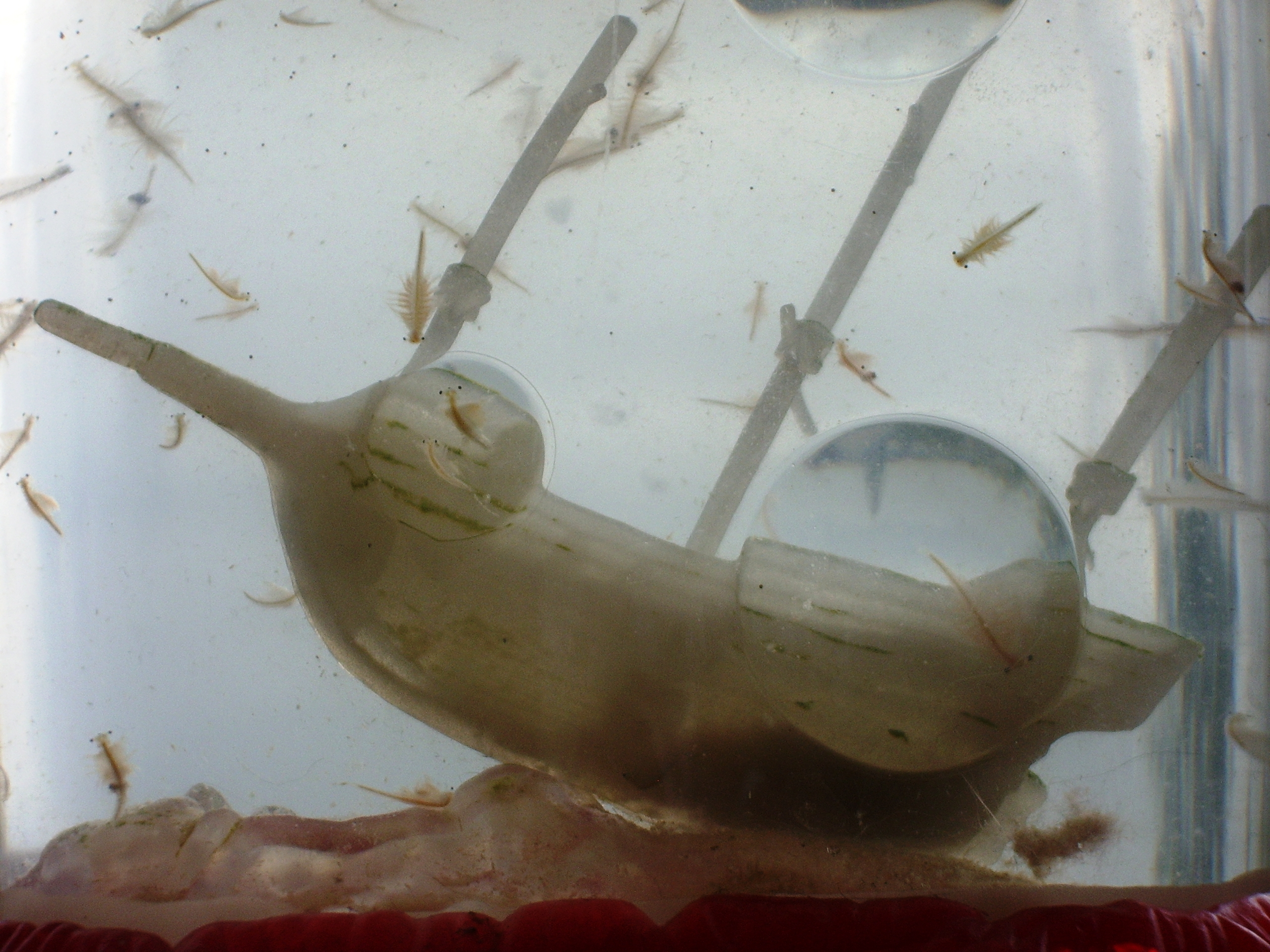
- Other names: Instant Life/Artemia NYOS
- Type: Novelty aquarium pet
- Invented by: Harold von Braunhut
- Country: United States
- Availability: 1962–present
- Slogan: The World's Only Instant Pets!

Sea-Monkeys is a marketing term for brine shrimp (Artemia) sold as novelty aquarium pets. Developed in the United States in 1957 by Harold von Braunhut and sold under the Sea-Monkeys name from 1962, they are supplied as eggs intended to be added to water, and most often come bundled in a kit of three pouches and instructions. Sometimes a small tank and additional pouches are included. The product was marketed in the 1960s and 1970s, especially in comic books, and remains a presence in popular culture.

== History ==
Ant farms had been popularized in 1956 by Milton Levine. Harold von Braunhut invented a brine-shrimp-based product the next year (1957). Von Braunhut collaborated with a marine biologist, Anthony D'Agostino, to develop the proper mix of nutrients and chemicals in dry form that could be added to plain tap water to create a suitable habitat for the shrimp to thrive. Von Braunhut was granted a patent for this process on July 4, 1972.

They were initially called "Instant Life" and sold for $0.49 (equivalent to $5 in 2025), but von Braunhut changed the name to "Sea-Monkeys" in 1962. The new name was based on their salt-water habitat, together with the supposed resemblance of the animals' tails to those of monkeys. An early competitor from Wham-O, Instant Fish, was unsuccessful.

Sea-Monkeys were heavily marketed in comic books throughout the 1960s and early 1970s using illustrations by Joe Orlando. These showed humanoid animals that bore no resemblance to the crustaceans. Many purchasers were disappointed by the dissimilarity and by the short lifespan of the animals.

Von Braunhut said that he bought around 3.2 million pages of comic book advertising a year, and that it worked well.

== Use ==
A colony is started by adding the contents of a packet labeled "Water Purifier" to a tank of water. This packet contains salt, water conditioner, and brine shrimp eggs. After 24 hours, this is augmented with the contents of a packet labeled "Instant Life Eggs", containing more eggs, yeast, borax, soda, salt, some food, and sometimes a dye. Shortly after that, Sea-Monkeys hatch from the eggs that were in the "Water Purifier" packet. "Growth Food" containing yeast and spirulina is then added every seven days. The best temperature for hatching is 24–27 °C (75–81 °F). Additional pouches can be purchased on the official website, though these are not required for the well-being of the Sea-Monkeys.

Artemia usually has a lifespan of two to three months. Under ideal home conditions, pet sea-monkeys have been observed to live for up to five years. As they are easy to breed and care for, brine shrimp are also often used as a model organism in scientific research to study developmental biology, genetics, and toxicology.

== Biology ==
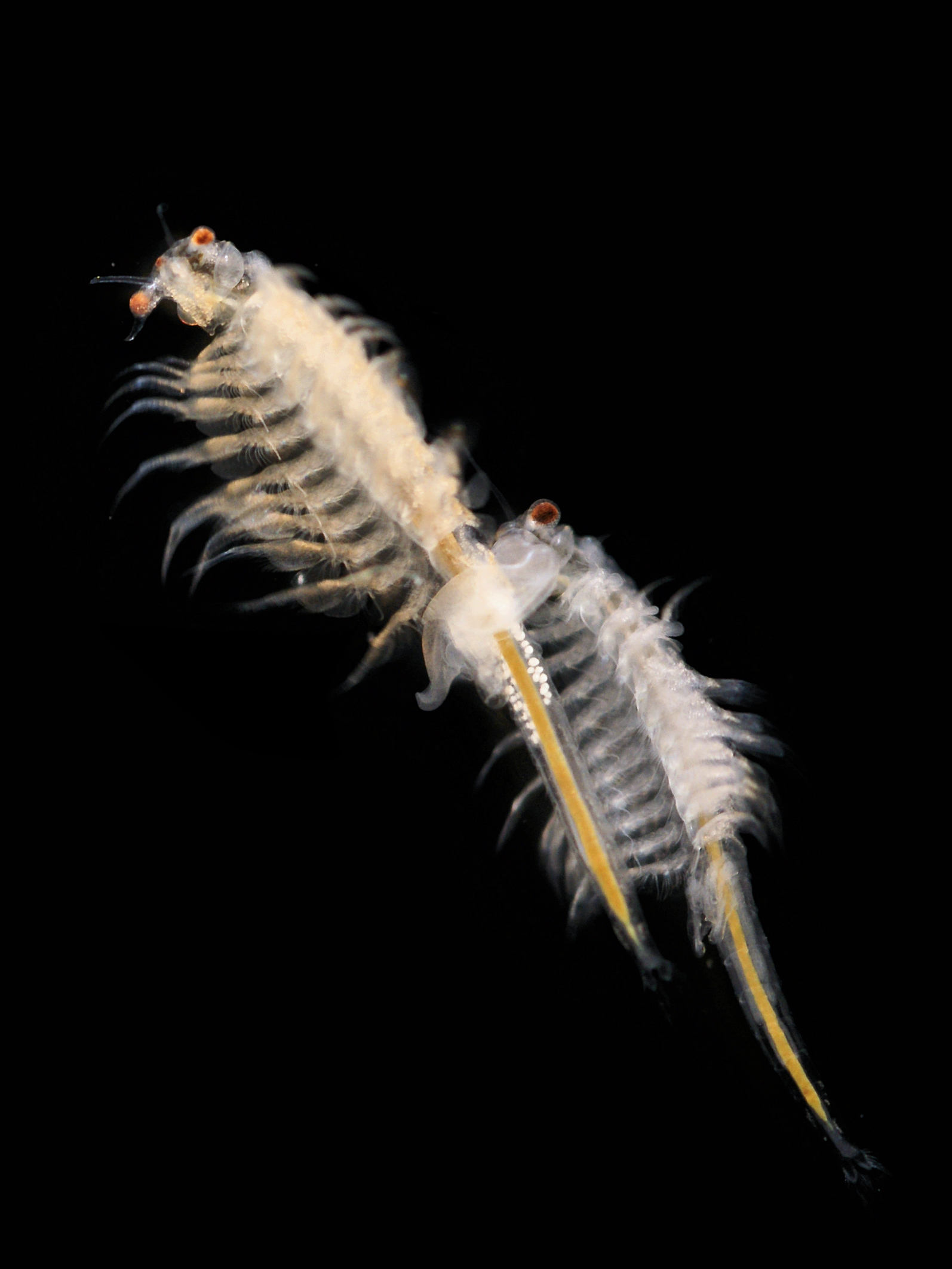
Two Artemia salina mating

The animals sold as Sea-Monkeys are claimed to be an artificial breed known as Artemia NYOS, formed by hybridizing different species of Artemia. Included in those hybridized species is Artemia franciscana. The manufacturer also claims that they live longer and grow bigger than ordinary brine shrimp. They undergo cryptobiosis or anhydrobiosis, a condition of apparent lifelessness which allows them to survive the desiccation of the temporary pools in which they live. Sea-Monkeys are known for their unique life cycle. They hatch from eggs that can remain dormant for years until they are exposed to water. Once the eggs are in water, they hatch into nauplius larvae, which eventually develop into adult Sea-Monkeys. The entire life cycle takes around 8–10 weeks.

Astronaut John Glenn took Sea-Monkeys into space on October 29, 1998, aboard Space Shuttle Discovery during mission STS-95. After nine days in space, they were returned to Earth and hatched eight weeks later, apparently unaffected by their travels. However, earlier experiments on Apollo 16 and Apollo 17, where the eggs (along with other biological systems in a state of rest, such as spores, seeds, and cysts) traveled to the Moon and back and were exposed to significant cosmic rays, observed a high sensitivity to cosmic radiation in the Artemia salina eggs; only 10% of the embryos which were induced to develop from eggs survived to adulthood. The most-common mutations found during the developmental stages of the irradiated eggs were deformations of the abdomen or deformations on the swimming-appendages and naupliar eye of the nauplius.

== See also ==
- Triops – Genus of small crustaceans
- Mexican jumping bean – Seed pods inhabited by a moth larva, also advertised in comic books
- Formicarium – Vivarium which is designed primarily for the study of ant colonies
- The Amazing Live Sea Monkeys – American TV comedy series
- Tamagotchi
