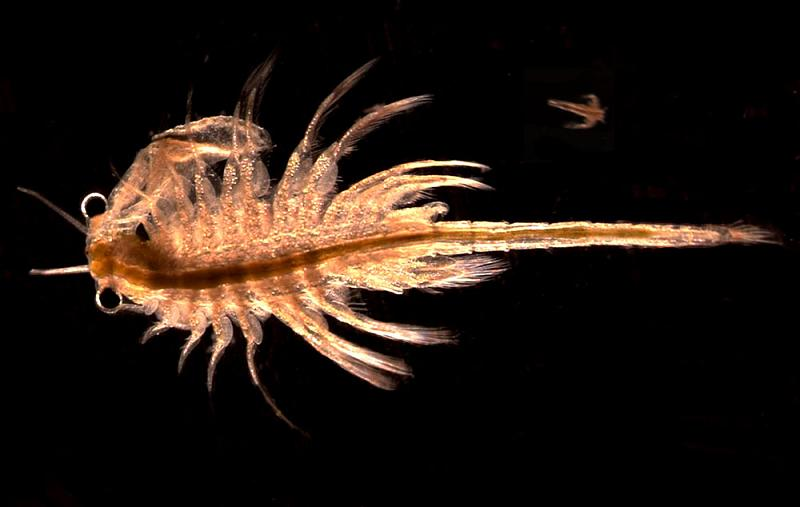
- Artemia monica (male)
- Artemia monica (female)

Conservation status
- Conservation Dependent (IUCN 2.3)

- Vulnerable (NatureServe)

Scientific classification
- Kingdom: Animalia
- Phylum: Arthropoda
- Clade: Pancrustacea
- Class: Branchiopoda
- Order: Anostraca
- Family: Artemiidae
- Genus: Artemia
- Species: A. monica

Binomial name
- Artemia monica Verrill, 1869

= Artemia monica =

Mono Lake brine shrimp

Species of crustacean

Artemia monica, the Mono Lake brine shrimp, is a species of brine shrimp endemic to Mono Lake in California, United States. It is separated from other Artemia species by its exclusive ability to tolerate the unique conditions of the lake. It is a filter feeder, grazing on floating algae and bacteria, and plays a key role in maintaining algal population size. The species is also an extremely important food source for several species of birds. The species may be found in extreme densities of hundreds of thousands per cubic meter, and in total may number in the trillions.

== Taxonomy ==
Artemia monica was named and described in 1869 by Addison Emery Verrill. It is sometimes considered to be a sibling species of Artemia franciscana, which is widespread in the Americas and has also been introduced elsewhere. The two are very closely related, and in some cases, are unlikely to be distinguished, even genetically. However, the two species are completely prevented from interbreeding as they have different water requirements. This lack of gene flow is why A. monica is often considered its own valid species; separated from A. franciscana via the biological species concept.

The taxonomy of the species has undergone considerable revision. Prior sources have treated A. monica as a "superspecies" with A. franciscana, though this is not a recognized ICZN classification. Additionally, it has been treated as both a subspecies of A. franciscana, as well as being completely synonymous with A. fransiscana. These classifications are also invalid, since A. monica was described first, and therefore takes precedence for synonymy. Further complicating things, the name Artemia salina is frequently used to refer to any Artemia species.

Only one type specimen is known under the original name; a syntype held in the Yale Peabody Museum in Connecticut. Three additional type specimens under the synonymized name Artemia fertilis may also be found here.

== Description ==
Male and female Mono Lake brine shrimp are sexually dimorphic, meaning they have different anatomical characteristics. Females measure 13 mm (0.51 in) in maximum length and are 5 mm (0.20 in) wide. Males are 11.5 mm (0.45 in) in maximum length. Additionally, females have two round egg sacs called ovisacs, while males have a large pair of modified second antennae used for grabbing females while mating. These claspers have three joints, the first of which is convex, and the last two being triangular. The first pair of antennae are short, and do not extend past the first joint of the claspers in males. A structure called a caudal appendage is present on the tail of the animal, which is rounded, nearly as wide as it is long, and displays nine or ten hairs called setae.

A male (bottom) uses its modified antennae to grab onto a female (top)

There are few anatomical characteristics that can distinguish the Mono Lake brine shrimp from other Artemia species. One such characteristic is a structure called the frontal knob on the male's claspers, which when viewed under microscope, have differing arrangements of spines and sensory setae compared to Artemia franciscana. However, this was not shown to be a significant difference. The eggs (cysts) of A. monica are wrinkled with circular markings, and sink in water. This distinguishes it from Artemia franciscana, whose cysts float and are smooth.

== Distribution and habitat ==
Artemia monica is found exclusively in Mono Lake, a hypersaline lake in eastern California in the United States. The lake has an average pH of 9.7, with a high concentration of dissolved carbonates, sodium, and sulfates, as well as a low concentration of calcium. This specific combination of ions may be the result of volcanic activity in the region, including the volcanic islands in the center of the lake. It may live in water temperatures ranging from 0 to 20 °C (32 to 68 °F), though other sources put their lower limit at 10 °C (50 °F).

The shrimp may be found in two distinct habitats within the lake; the shallows and open water. In shallow water near the shore, tufa towers, differing substrates, benthic (bottom-dwelling) algae, and freshwater inflow creates a non-uniform habitat. In this habitat, the shrimp form small shoals or patches, and may be more common at mid-depths of around 3 to 7 m (9.8 to 23.0 ft). In open water, the shrimp cluster around the thermocline (a depth at which temperature suddenly changes), which varies in depth from year to year. The vertical distribution of the shrimp may vary with the seasons, oxygen concentration, currents, food availability, and temperature. Additionally, the species may have a daily vertical migration, where the shrimp rise to the surface at night and fall back down in the day.

In a 1964 experiment, it was found that A. monica was unable to survive in conditions suitable for other Artemia species. Conversely, no other Artemia species could survive in the conditions of Mono Lake, likely due to low calcium concentrations. Because no other Artemia species can survive in Mono Lake, A. monica is genetically isolated. However, A. monica has been shown to survive in water with artificially altered ion concentrations, including the complete absence of calcium and magnesium.

== Ecology ==
The species may be found in high densities

The Mono Lake brine shrimp is the primary species of zooplankton in Mono Lake, found in densities as high as 1,941 individuals per cubic meter, and in sites with upwelling, as high as 307,000 per cubic meter. These extreme densities in upwelling sites are thought to be the result of the shrimp being physically trapped by circulating currents, as well as by attracting the shrimp with increased food. The lake as a whole may support a shrimp population of up to six trillion in the summer.

Artemia monica is a filter feeder, eating suspended algae (phytoplankton), bacteria, and possibly organic matter. Its specialized legs have a shape that allows water to be pulled towards the animal as it swims, and are additionally covered in hair-like setae, filtering particles from the water. Filtered particles are moved to a food groove on the animal's underside, where it is then swallowed. Grazing pressure from the shrimp may be the primary factor in the maintenance of algal populations in the lake. When the shrimp reach adulthood in May, their feeding leads to a dramatic decline in surface phytoplankton, which remains low throughout the summer. As the shrimp die off in the fall, the algae begins to increase again. The nitrogenous waste produced by the shrimp may also modulate algal growth by providing a nitrogen source for photosynthesis during periods of low nitrogen. This process of recycling nutrients is important as the water in Mono Lake goes through periods of meromixis (low mixing), leading to a loss of nutrients.

This brine shrimp is also a highly important food source for several bird species, most notably the California Gull and black-necked grebe. The California gull uses Mono Lake as a breeding ground, and during their stay, about 50,000 individuals (15 to 25% of the entire species) will be present. For the young gulls, the Mono Lake brine shrimp may make up over 90% of the diet by volume. Some 750,000 black-necked grebes use the lake each year to molt, during which over 90% of their diet may consist of the brine shrimp. Though one source found the shrimp to make up a much smaller percentage of the diet of the Wilson's phalarope and the northern phalarope, another source estimated that it comprised up to 80% of the diet of the Wilson's phalarope in the fall.

== Reproduction and development ==
Female carrying a brood of eggs (cysts)

Unlike some Artemia species, the Mono Lake brine shrimp is gonochoric, meaning that it has two separate sexes; males and females. On average, it was found that there is a ratio of two males for every one female. The species has a life cycle that involves two generations per year. The first generation hatches from eggs, called cysts, which must go through a cold cycle before hatching between January to May. In June, the second generation is born through ovovivipary, where the cysts develop and hatch inside the body of their parents. This second generation subsequently reproduces via oviparity, or laying eggs. Females carry a brood of cysts in a structure called an ovisac. Second generation shrimp may carry between 30 and 40 cysts per brood, with an average turnover of 2.6 to 3.6 cysts per day. Reproduction occurs after the females have molted, every four to six days. Once the cysts hatch, the juvenile shrimp are called nauplii. After 9–11 molts of their exoskeleton (instar stages), the nauplii are considered juveniles. It will take 14 instars to reach maturity.

== Human uses and impacts ==
The Mono Lake brine shrimp is harvested commercially, where they are frozen and sold across the world. The shrimp are used as food for tropical fish and aquacultured prawns.

In 1941, the city of Los Angeles, California diverted four of the five streams that feed fresh water into Mono Lake, and by 1970, it became common for the city to take all of the water from these streams. Without the influx of water from the streams, the water in the lake evaporated, and by 1986, the water level had decreased by 45 ft (14 m), or about half its total volume. This decrease in water level also doubled the salinity (salt concentration) and reduced the lake's surface area by 30%. That same year, a study found that this increase in salinity was harmful to multiple aspects of the species' reproduction and development. Ultimately, this was projected to cause the extinction of the species by 2050. Several lawsuits were filed against the city for its environmental damage, and in 1987, the species was petitioned to be added to the United States Endangered Species List. This petition failed, and the shrimp was not added to the list, citing remediation efforts in 1994. This remediation came when the California State Water Resources Control Board banned the city of Los Angeles from taking any more water until the lake reached a water level of 6,377 ft (1,944 m), and limited its water usage after that to maintain a water level of 6,392 ft (1,948 m). However, as of 2026, the lake has not reached this goal, still 10 ft (3.0 m) below the mandate.

In 1995, the Mono Lake brine shrimp was classified as a category 3C species under the United States Endangered Species Act, meaning that it is abundant and faces no threats. Other institutions rate the species differently, being listed as conservation dependent in the IUCN's 1996 assessment, meaning that current conservation efforts are preventing more damage. NatureServe's 2013 assessment rates the species as vulnerable, since the species consists of only a single population. Because this species is so important to the ecology of the lake, its extinction would have drastic effects on other species.
