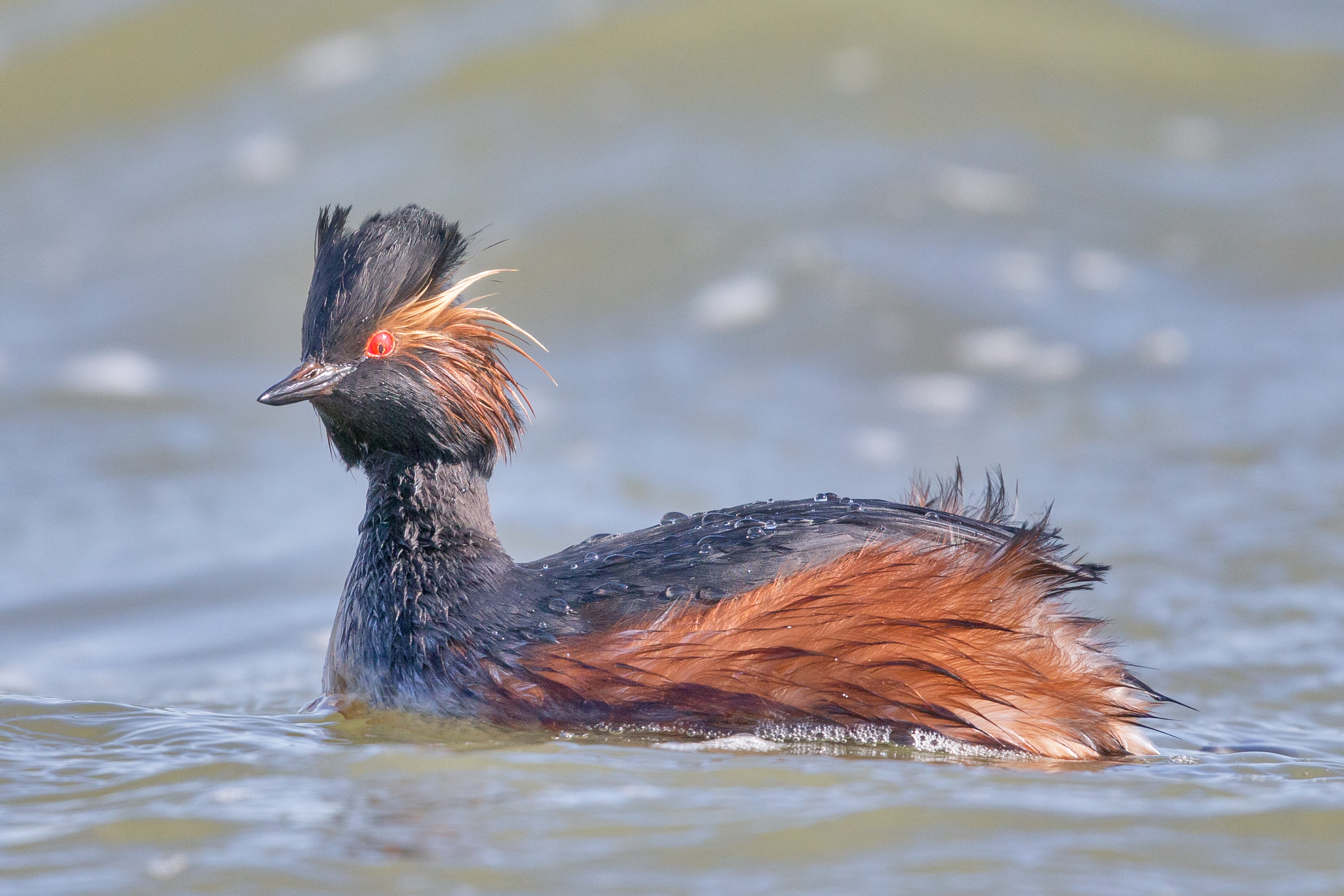
- Subspecies nigricollis, adult breeding plumage
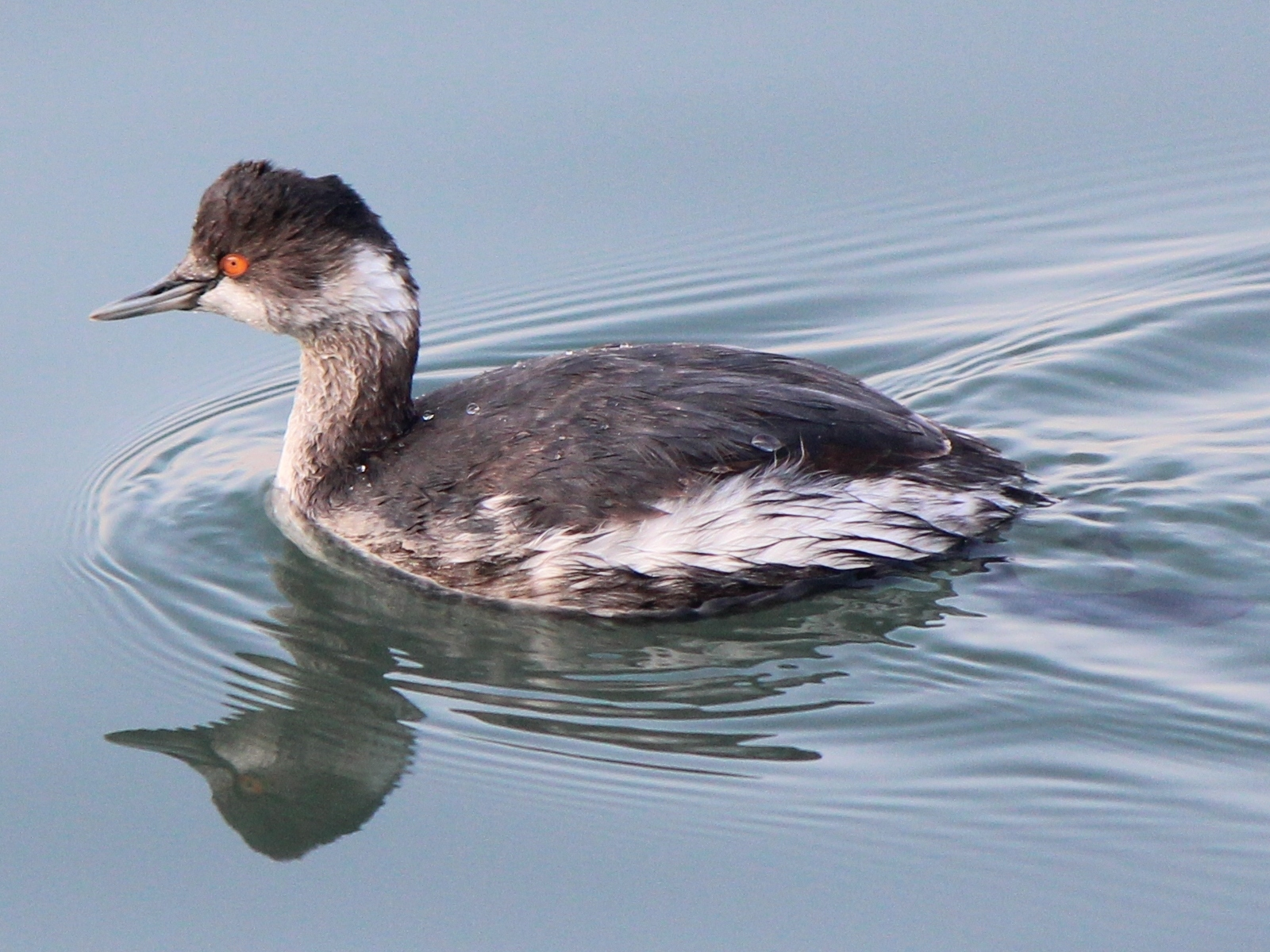
- Subspecies nigricollis, adult non-breeding plumage

Conservation status
- Least Concern (IUCN 3.1)

Scientific classification
- Kingdom: Animalia
- Phylum: Chordata
- Class: Aves
- Order: Podicipediformes
- Family: Podicipedidae
- Genus: Podiceps
- Species: P. nigricollis

Binomial name
- Podiceps nigricollis Brehm, 1831
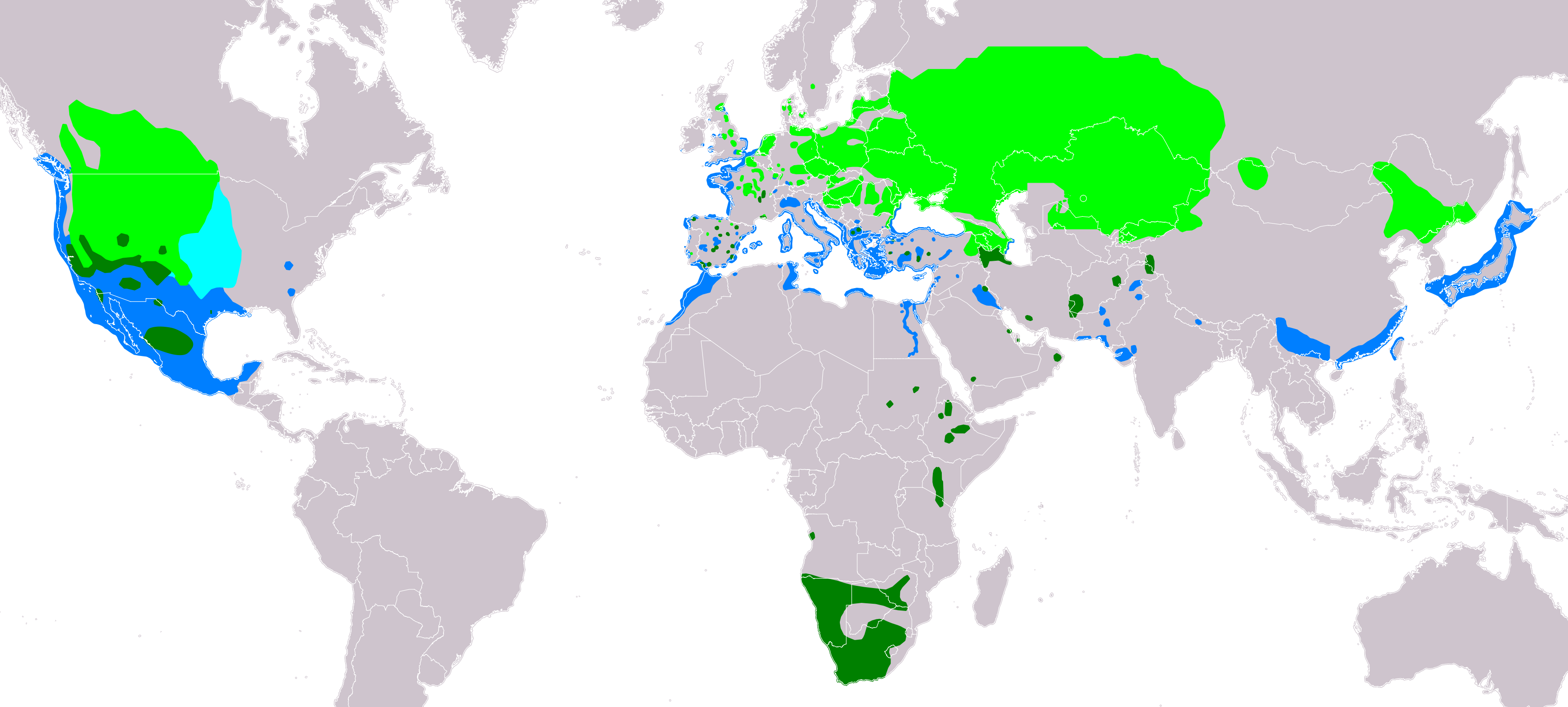
- Range of P. nigricollis Breeding Resident Passage Non-breeding

= Black-necked grebe =

Water bird from parts of Africa, Eurasia, and the Americas

The black-necked grebe or eared grebe (Podiceps nigricollis) is a member of the grebe family of water birds. It was described in 1831 by Christian Ludwig Brehm. Its breeding plumage features distinctive ochre-coloured feathers which extend behind its eye and over its ear coverts. The rest of the upper parts, including the head, neck, and breast, are coloured black to blackish brown. The flanks are tawny rufous to maroon-chestnut, and the abdomen is white. In its non-breeding plumage, this bird has greyish-black upper parts, including the top of the head and a vertical stripe on the back of the neck. The flanks are also greyish-black. The rest of the body is a white or whitish colour. The juvenile has more brown in its darker areas. This species is present in parts of Africa, Eurasia, and the Americas.

The black-necked grebe uses multiple foraging techniques. Insects, which make up the majority of this bird's diet, are caught either on the surface of the water or when they are in flight; this species occasionally practices foliage gleaning. This grebe dives to catch crustaceans, molluscs, tadpoles, and small frogs and fish. When moulting at saline lakes, this bird feeds mostly on brine shrimps (such as Artemia franciscana, and "Artemia parthenogenetica"). The black-necked grebe makes a floating cup nest on an open lake. The nest cup is covered with a disc. This nest is located both in colonies and by itself. During the breeding season, which varies depending on location, this species will lay one (sometimes two) clutch of three to four eggs. The number of eggs is sometimes larger due to conspecific brood parasitism. After a 21-day incubation period, the eggs hatch, and then the nest is deserted. After about 10 days, the parents split up the chicks between themselves. After this, the chicks become independent in about 10 days, and fledge in about three weeks.

Although it generally avoids flight, the black-necked grebe travels as far as 6,000 kilometres (3,700 mi) during migration. In addition, it becomes flightless for at least a month after completing a migration to reach an area where it can moult safely. During this moult, the grebe can double in weight. The migration to reach these areas can be dangerous, sometimes with thousands of grebe deaths. In spite of this, it is classified as a least concern species by the International Union for Conservation of Nature (IUCN). It is likely that this is the most numerous grebe in the world. There are potential threats to it, such as oil spills, but these are not likely to present a major risk to the overall population.

== Taxonomy ==
This species was first described by Carl Ludwig Hablitz in 1783 as Colymbus caspicus, from a bird in Bandar-e Anzali. This was originally thought to be a synonym for the horned grebe, until Erwin Stresemann discovered that the description applied more to the black-necked grebe in 1948. Before this, the earliest description was thought to be by Christian Ludwig Brehm in 1831, who gave this bird its current scientific name of Podiceps nigricollis from a German bird. To resolve this, the International Commission on Zoological Nomenclature suppressed the name Colymbus caspicus. The genus name Dytes is sometimes used for this species and its closest relatives, a placement which was preferred by Robert Ridgway in 1881.

=== Subspecies ===
There are currently three accepted subspecies.

Summer	Winter	Scientific name	Common name	Distribution	Notes
Altlußheim, Baden-Württemberg, Germany	Borith Lake, Gilgit-Baltistan, Pakistan	P. n. nigricollis Brehm, 1831	Black-necked grebe (Eurasian)	Across the temperate Palearctic from western Europe to eastern Asia, wintering further south to northern Africa, the Persian Gulf, and southern China.	Nominate subspecies. East African birds (Ethiopia, Kenya) are included in this subspecies, rather than P. n. gurneyi, by some authors.
Grassy Park, Cape Town, Western Cape, South Africa	Cape Town, Western Cape, South Africa	P. n. gurneyi (Roberts, 1919)	Black-necked grebe (African)	Eastern and southern Africa from Ethiopia to South Africa; resident	Greyer head and upper parts; smallest subspecies. Note that HBW erroneously states this subspecies does not have a winter plumage; this is contradicted by regional field guides, which illustrate and describe it, as well as by photographic evidence.
Tule Lake NWR, Klamath Basin, California, USA	San Luis Obispo, California, USA	P. n. californicus (Heermann, 1854)	Eared grebe	Interior southwestern Canada and the western United States, wintering on the Pacific coast and inland waters from southwestern Canada south to Guatemala, occasional east to the Atlantic coast.	Longer bill than other the subspecies.

This bird is closely related to the South American silvery grebe and Junin grebe. The extinct Colombian grebe P. andinus is particularly closely related, and is often considered to be a subspecies of P. nigricollis; it is genetically nested within it, with P. n. californicus being more closely related to P. andinus, than it is to P. n. nigricollis.

== Etymology ==
The generic name, Podiceps, comes from two Latin words: podicis, meaning 'vent' or 'anus', and pes meaning 'foot'. This is a reference to the attachment point of the bird's legs at the extreme back end of its body. The specific epithet nigricollis is Latin for 'black-necked': niger means 'black' and collis means 'neck'. The subspecies epithet californicus comes from "California", while gurneyi comes from the name of British ornithologist John Henry Gurney Sr.

"Black-necked grebe" has been designated the official name by the International Ornithological Committee (IOC). Both common names for this species refer to features visible when the bird is in its breeding plumage; in such plumage, it has an all-black neck and a spray of golden plumes on each side of its head. The name "eared grebe" is nearly a century older than the name "black-necked grebe". The latter was first used in 1912 by Ernst Hartert, in an effort to bring the common name of the species in line with its scientific name, and/or to avoid the long history of confusion between the vernacular name "eared" with the scientific name of the horned grebe Podiceps auritus (auritus, Latin, 'eared'). The name "eared grebe" is still used in North America to refer to this bird.

== Description ==
The black-necked grebe usually measures between 28 and 34 centimetres (11 and 13 in) in length and has a wingspan range of 56–60 centimetres (22–24 in) in P. n. nigricollis, and 52–55 centimetres (20–22 in) in P. n. californicus. It weighs 215 to 450 grams (7.6 to 15.9 oz), with males being on average heavier than females. The nominate subspecies in breeding plumage has the head, neck, breast, and upper parts coloured black to blackish brown, with the exception of the ochre-coloured fan of feathers extending behind the eye over the eye-coverts and sides of the nape. The eye is a vivid bright red, with a narrow and paler yellow ring on the inner parts of the eye and an orange-yellow to pinkish-red orbital ring. The thin, upturned bill, on the other hand, is black, and is connected to the eye by a blackish line starting at the gape. Sometimes, the foreneck can be found to be mostly tinged brown. The upperwing is blackish to drab brown in colour and has a white patch formed by the secondaries and part of the inner primaries. The flanks are coloured tawny rufous to maroon-chestnut and have the occasional blackish fleck. The underwing and abdomen is white, with an exception to the former being the dark tertials and the mostly pale grey-brown outer primaries. The legs are a dark greenish grey. The sexes are similar.

In non-breeding plumage, the nominate has greyish-black upper parts, cap, nape, and hindneck, with the colour on the upper portion of the latter being contained in a vertical stripe. The dark colour of the cap reaches below the eye and can be seen, diffused, to the ear-coverts. Behind the ear-coverts on the sides of the neck, there are white ovals. The rest of the neck is grey to brownish-grey in colour and has white that varies in amount. The breast is white, and the abdomen is whitish. The flanks are coloured in a mix of blackish-grey with white flecks. The colour of the bill when not breeding differs from that of the breeding plumage, with the former being significantly more grey.

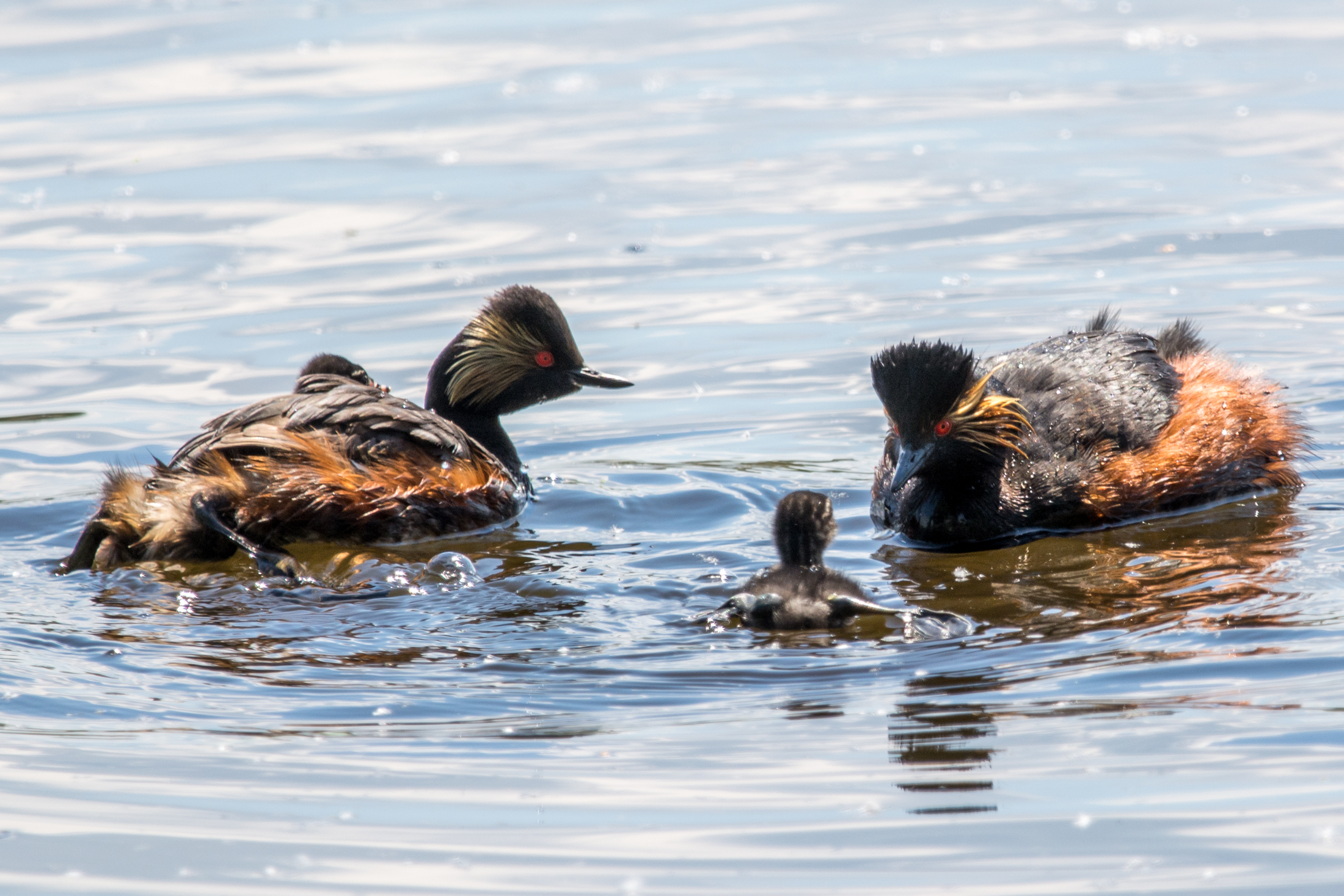
Pair of black-necked grebes with juveniles, Altlußheim, Baden-Württemberg, Germany

The juvenile black-necked grebe is similar to the non-breeding adult. There are differences, however, including the fact that the dark areas are usually more brownish in the juvenile, with less black. The lores are often tinged pale grey, with whitish marks behind the eye. On the sides of the head and upper neck, there is a buffy or tawny tinge. The chick is downy and has a blackish-grey head with stripes and spots that are white or pale buff-grey. The throat and foreneck are largely pale. The upper parts are mostly dark grey in colour, and the abdomen is white.

The subspecies P. n. californicus usually has a longer bill compared to the nominate, and has brown-grey inner primaries during the breeding season. When not breeding, the nominate has diffuse and pale lores less often than P. n. californicus. The African subspecies P. n. gurneyi is the smallest of the three subspecies, in addition to having a greyer head and upper parts. The adult of this subspecies also has a rufous-brown tinge on its lesser wing-coverts.

=== Vocalisations ===
When breeding, the black-necked grebe gives a quiet "ooeek" that ascends in pitch from an already high pitch. This call is also used as a territorial call, in addition to a low and fast trill, which itself is also used during courtship. Another call is a short "puuii" or "wit". This grebe is silent when it is not the breeding season and when it is feeding or resting.

== Distribution and habitat ==
This species breeds in vegetated areas of freshwater lakes across temperate Europe, Asia, eastern and southern Africa, interior southwestern Canada, and the southwest and western United States. After breeding, this bird migrates to saline lakes to moult. Then, after completing the moult and waiting for sometimes several months, it migrates to winter in places such as the south-western Palearctic and the eastern parts of both Africa and Asia. It also winters in southern Africa, another place where it breeds. In the Americas, it winters as far south as Guatemala, and occasionally further south in Central America, although larger wintering populations there are mainly restricted to islands in the Gulf of California, the Salton Sea, and Baja California. When not breeding, its habitat is primarily saline lakes, sheltered inshore seas, and coastal estuaries.

== Behaviour ==
This grebe is highly gregarious, usually forming large colonies when breeding and large flocks when not.

=== Breeding ===
This species builds its floating nest in the usually shallow water of open lakes. The nest itself is anchored to the lake by plants. It is built by both the male and the female and made out of plant matter. Most of it is submerged, with the bottom of the shallow cup usually being level with the water. Above the cup, there is a flat disc. This grebe nests both in colonies and by itself. When it does not nest by itself, it will often nest in mixed-species colonies made up of black-headed gulls, ducks, and various other waterbirds. The space between the nests in these colonies is often 1 to 2 metres (3.3 to 6.6 ft). Whether it nests in colonies or not has an effect on the dimensions of the nest. When the bird is not in a colony, the nest has an average diameter of 28 centimetres (11 in), although this can vary, with nests ranging from about 20 centimetres (8 in) to over 30 centimetres (12 in). This is compared to nests in colonies, which have an average diameter of about 25.5 centimetres (10 in). It is suggested that rarely some pairs of this grebe will steward over multiple nests when in colonies.

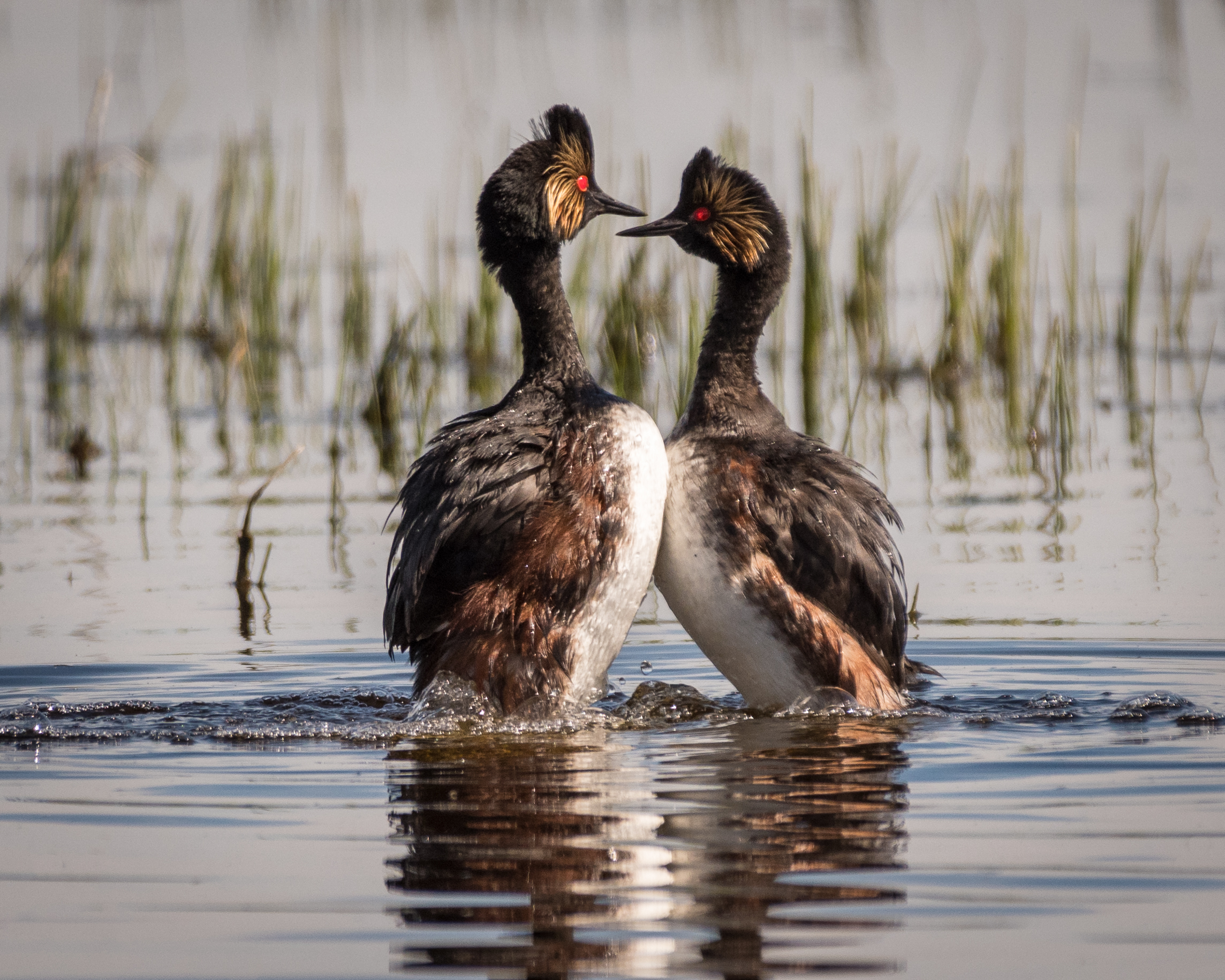
Eared grebes courting, Tule Lake NWR, Klamath Basin, California

Pair formation in the black-necked grebe usually starts during pauses in the migration to the breeding grounds, although it occasionally occurs before, in wintering pairs. This pair formation continues after this grebe has arrived to its breeding grounds. Courtship occurs when it arrives at the breeding lake. The displays are performed in the middle of the lake. There is no territory involved in courting; individuals use the whole area of the lake. When advertising for a mate, a black-necked grebe will approach others of its species with its body fluffed out and its neck erect. It closes its beak to perform a call, poo-eee-chk, with the last note only barely audible. Courtship generally stops at the start of nesting.

In the Northern Hemisphere, this bird breeds from April to August. In east Africa, the breeding season is at least from January to February, while in southern Africa, the breeding season is from October to April.

The black-necked grebe is socially monogamous. Conspecific or intraspecific brood parasitism (dump nesting), where the female lays eggs in the nest of others of their own species is common with on average nearly 40% of nests being subjected to dump-nesting. In terms of territory, this grebe will defend only its nest site.

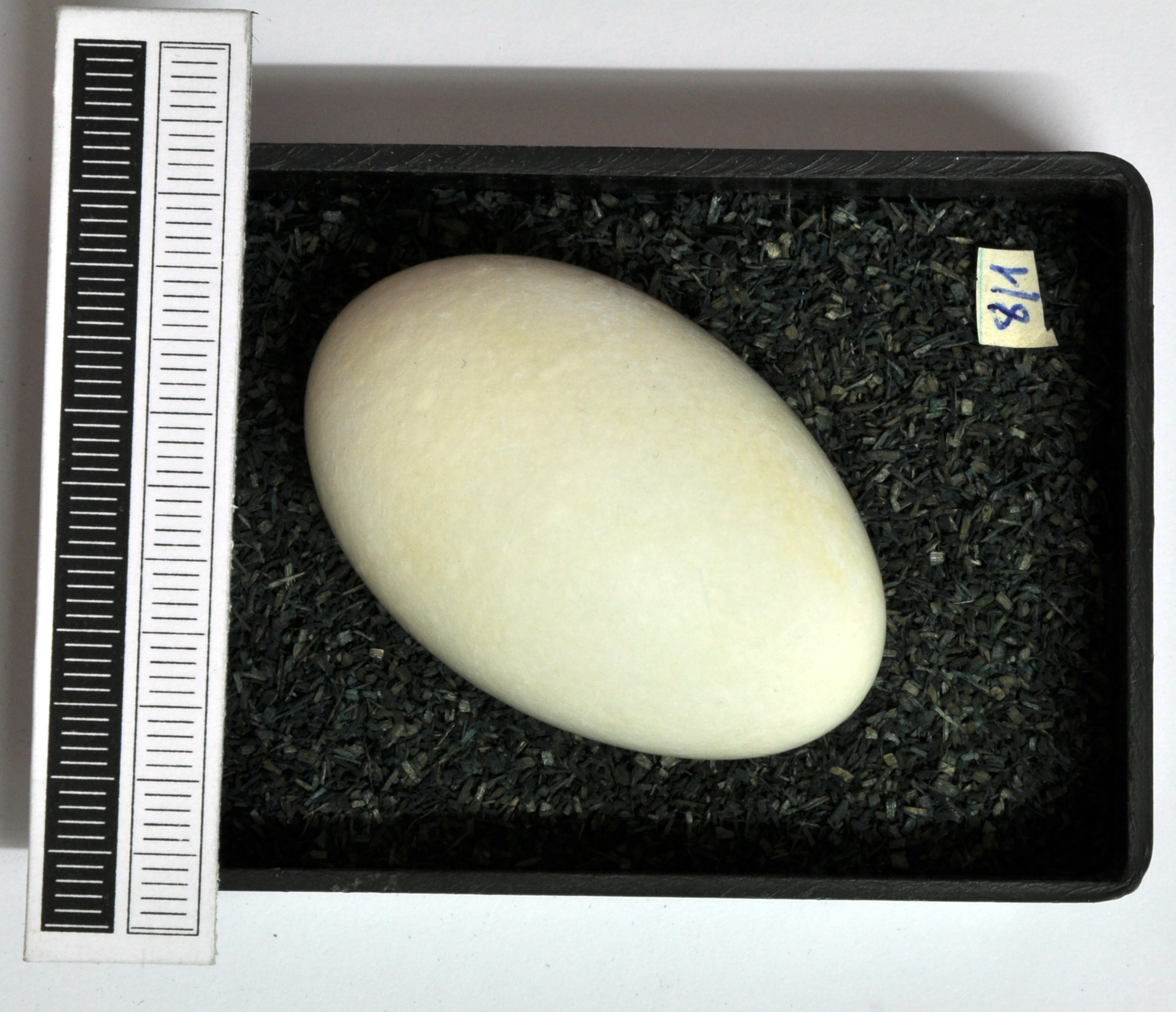
Egg, Collection Museum Wiesbaden, Germany

This grebe lays a clutch, sometimes two, of three to four chalky greenish or bluish eggs. Nests that have been subjected to dump-nesting will have two more eggs on average, even though the number the host lays is about the same no matter if it has been subjected to dump-nesting or not. The eggs, although initially immaculate, do get stained by plant matter that the nest is built out of. The eggs measure 45 by 30 millimetres (1.8 by 1.2 in) on average and are incubated by both parents for about 21 days. The laying date of the eggs is somewhat synchronised, with birds in small colonies having the laying dates spread out by just a few days, compared to large colonies, where the laying date is spread out over more than 10 days.

After the chicks hatch, the birds will desert their nest. Even though the young can swim and dive during this time, they rarely do, instead staying on the parents' backs for four days after hatching. This behaviour is present in all grebes, and is likely to have evolved because it reduces travel costs, specifically those back to the nest to brood the chicks and give them food. After about 10 days, the parents split the chicks up, with each parent taking care of about half of the brood. After this split, the chicks are independent in about 10 days, and fledge in about three weeks.

When disturbed while incubating, this bird usually (just under 50% of the time) partly covers its eggs with nest material when the disruption is not sudden, but a bird with an incomplete clutch usually does not attempt to cover the eggs. When the disruption is sudden, on the other hand, the black-necked grebe usually (just under 50% of the time) does not cover its eggs. In comparison, other species of grebes cover up their eggs when leaving the nest. Predation is usually not the primary cause of egg loss, with most nesting failures occurring after the chicks have hatched. A major cause of this is the chilling of the young.

=== Feeding ===
Video including a juvenile being fed

The black-necked grebe forages mainly by diving from the water, with dives usually lasting less than 30 seconds. These dives are usually shorter in time when in more shallow water. In between dives, this grebe rests for an average of 15 seconds. When feeding on brine shrimp at hypersaline lakes, it likely uses its large tongue to block the oral cavity. It is suggested that it then crushes prey against its palate to remove excess water. It also forages by gleaning foliage, plucking objects off of the surface of water, having its head submerged while swimming, and sometimes capturing flying insects.

This grebe eats mostly insects, of both adult and larval stages, as well as crustaceans, molluscs, tadpoles, and small frogs and fish. When moulting at lakes with high salinity, however, this bird feeds mostly on brine shrimp, such as Artemia franciscana, and Artemia parthenogenetica. The behaviour of black-necked grebes changes in response to the availability of brine shrimp; bodies of water with more shrimps have more grebes, and grebes spend more time foraging when the number of shrimp and the water temperature decrease.

The young are fed one at a time by the parents, with one bird carrying the young while the other feeds it. The young take food by grabbing it, with their beaks, from their parents, or by grabbing food dropped into the water. When a young bird cannot grab the food, then the adults submerge their bill into the water and shake their bill to break up the food.

=== Moult and migration ===
When breeding is over, some black-necked grebes moult while still on the breeding grounds, but most do so only after a moult migration. This migration is to saline lakes, especially lakes with large numbers of invertebrate prey, so that birds can fatten up while moulting before continuing on the winter migration. The moult migration is dangerous, with hundreds and sometimes thousands of birds being killed by snowstorms when traveling to places such as Mono Lake.

After the moult migration, birds moult their remiges between August and September, which makes them unable to fly. The moult is preceded by an increase in weight. During the moult, the breast muscles atrophy. When the moult is completed, birds continue to gain weight, often more than doubling their original weight. This additional fat is used to power the black-necked grebe's overnight fall migration to its wintering grounds. The fat is most concentrated in the abdomen, second most in the thorax, and least in the chest. Migration usually starts earlier when shrimps are more abundant and when the moulting lake is at a higher than average temperature. Birds generally leave on a clear night with lower than average surface temperatures.

=== Movement ===
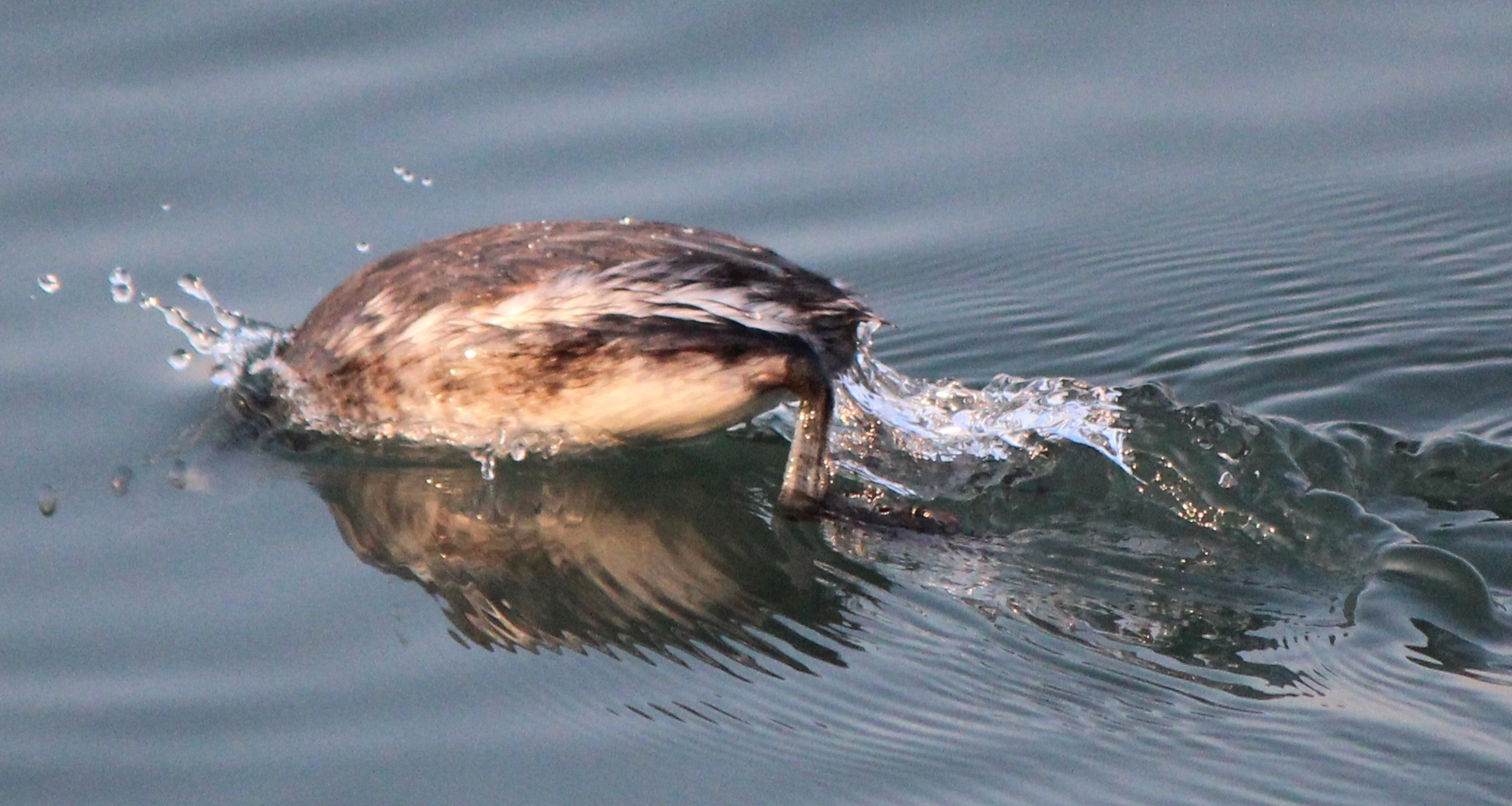
Diving

This grebe is one of the most inefficient fliers among birds. Generally, it avoids flying at all costs and reserves long-distance flight exclusively for migration. This is combined with the fact that this bird is flightless for 35–40 days during its moult. However, when migrating, it travels as much as 6,000 kilometres (3,700 miles) to reach rich feeding areas that are exploited by few other species. In flight, the shape of this grebe is like a loon: straight neck, legs trailing, and wings beating often.

When diving, this bird pulls its head back and then arches it forward into the water, with the body following and a slight springing. The legs start moving only after they are underwater. When swimming on the surface of the water, the body of this grebe is relatively high, although none of the underparts are seen. The neck is held straight up in a relaxed manner, with the bill being held forward and parallel to the water. Each of the feet perform strong alternating strokes.

== Disease ==
Large-scale deaths (such as 150,000 birds on the Salton Sea in 1992) from erysipelas, avian cholera, avian botulism, and West Nile virus have been recorded in the past. In 2013, at the Great Salt Lake, for example, there was an outbreak of West Nile virus which caused one of the largest recorded avian die-offs in the US. The cause of the outbreak and modes of transmission are unknown, but there has been speculation about the latter. Since West Nile virus is able to survive in brine shrimps (and, for a temporary time, water at specific temperatures), it is likely that grebes could have become infected by eating diseased shrimps and/or swimming in the contaminated water. It is also suggested that West Nile virus could be transmitted among grebes through contact with the excrement of an infected bird, possibly around bodies of water, communal nest sites, areas of cohabitating birds, etc. Avian cholera, another disease that can cause massive die-offs in this species, is transmitted by currently-unknown biotoxins and/or pathogens, as well as problems with feather waterproofing putting birds at risk.

== Status ==
As of 2016, the black-necked grebe is classified as least concern by the International Union for Conservation of Nature (IUCN). The trend of the population is uncertain, as some populations are decreasing, whereas others are stable, have an uncertain trend, or are increasing. The justification for the current classification of this species is its very large population (estimated around 3.9–4.2 million individuals) combined with a large estimated extent of occurrence (about 155 million km^{2} (60 million sq mi)). This grebe is probably the most numerous grebe in the world.

Unknown biotoxins, pathogens, and the impairment of feather waterproofing can lead to hypothermia and avian cholera. Since this grebe usually winters on the coast, it is also vulnerable to oil pollution. Large-scale disease, such as avian cholera, could threaten the species. These and other factors, such as human disturbance, including collisions with power transmission lines, contribute to declining populations in certain areas. This species used to be threatened in North America by the millinery industry, which helped facilitate the hunting of the birds, and egg collectors. Although this is true, this grebe is hunted in the Gilan Province in Iran, for both commercial and recreational purposes. However, there is no evidence suggesting that these threats could result in a significant risk for the overall population.

== Bibliography ==
- Ogilvie, Malcolm; Rose, Chris (2003). Grebes of the World. Uxbridge, UK: Bruce Coleman. ISBN 1-872842-03-8.
