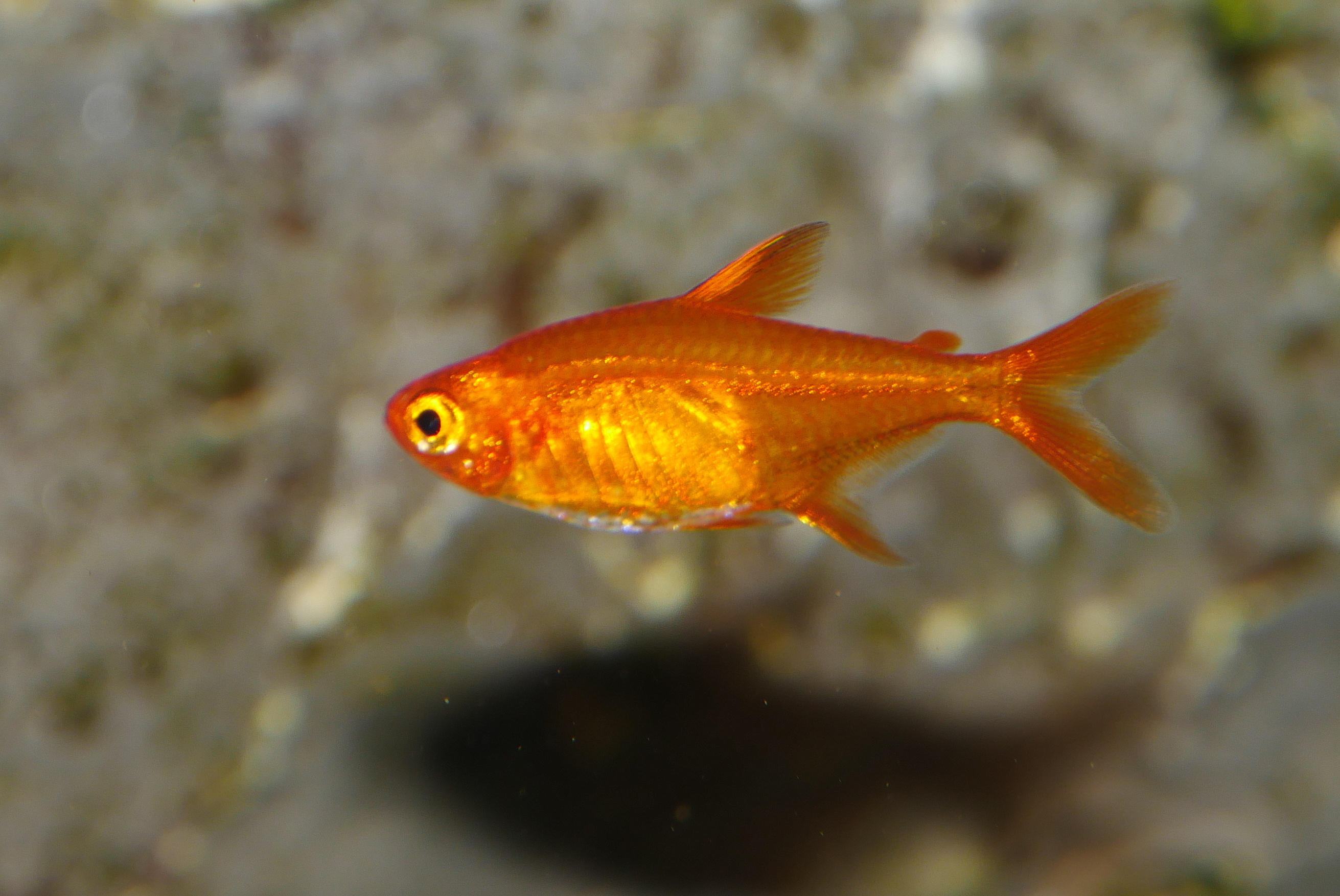

Conservation status
- Least Concern (IUCN 3.1)

Scientific classification
- Kingdom: Animalia
- Phylum: Chordata
- Class: Actinopterygii
- Division: Teleostei
- Order: Characiformes
- Family: Acestrorhamphidae
- Genus: Hyphessobrycon
- Species: H. amandae

Binomial name
- Hyphessobrycon amandae Géry & Uj, 1987

= Ember tetra =

Species of fish

The ember tetra (Hyphessobrycon amandae) is a species of freshwater ray-finned fish belonging to the family Acestrorhamphidae, the American characins. This fish is found in the Araguaia River basin of Brazil. It was discovered in 1987 and named in honor of the fish explorer Heiko Bleher's mother, Amanda Bleher.

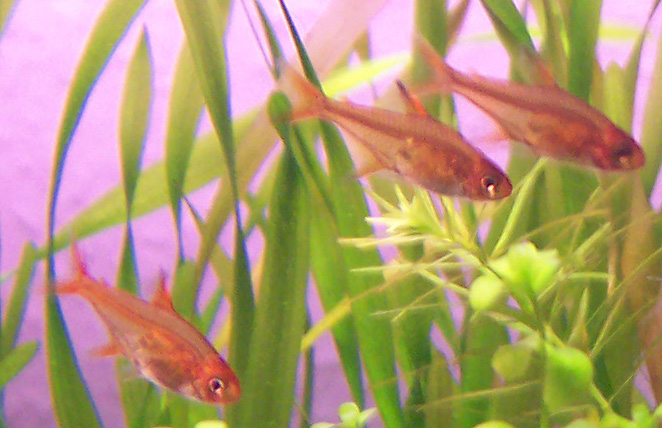

This species is of typical tetra shape but grows to a maximum overall length of approximately 2 cm (0.8 in) to 3 cm (1.2 in). Most exhibit striking orange and reddish coloration with mild translucency near the pelvic fin. The eye frequently mirrors the color of the fish and is outlined in black.

The fish's natural diet consist of small invertebrates and plants.

Although somewhat hard to find in fish stores, H. amandae is commonly kept as an aquarium fish by hobbyists.

== In the aquarium ==
The minimum tank size requirement for the Ember tetras is at least 10 gallons with few live aquarium plants. Ember tetras should be kept in acidic water with a pH near 6.6, and although their native habitat has very soft water, they have adapted quite well to a wide range of hardness (5–17 dGH). The recommended temperature range is 23–29 °C (73–84 °F).

Ideally their tank should contain live plants, a darker substrate, and open water for swimming. Ember tetras should be kept in groups of at least 6, though the recommended number is 9–10, in order to promote schooling. They appreciate a heavily planted aquarium ideally with a small area shaded from direct light, and will spend a lot of time swimming through planted areas, which also offer some protection for their fry.

Ember tetras will school with other tetras, such as the neon tetra, but may become stressed by the presence of significantly larger fish.

These fish swim at the middle level of the aquarium, and they do not feed from the bottom of the tank. Therefore, it is recommended that they are kept with other bottom dwelling fish (such as pygmy corydoras) so that leftover food is then eaten up off the substrate and not left to waste.

Ember tetras can be fed a variety of foods, including flake, frozen, and freeze dried food. Small live foods like worms and brine shrimp are also recommended, as they bring out the fish's colors.

In a well maintained heavily planted aquarium, ember tetras have been known to live ten years or more.

== See also ==
- List of freshwater aquarium fish species
