= Gastrodermus bilineatus =

Conservation status
- Data Deficient (IUCN 3.1)

Scientific classification
- Kingdom: Animalia
- Phylum: Chordata
- Class: Actinopterygii
- Order: Siluriformes
- Family: Callichthyidae
- Genus: Gastrodermus
- Species: G. bilineatus

Binomial name
- Gastrodermus bilineatus (Knaack, 2002)

Synonyms
- Corydoras bilineatus Knaack, 2002

Species of fish

Gastrodermus bilineatus, the white striped cory is a species of freshwater ray-finned fish belonging to the subfamily Corydoradinae, the corys, of the family Callichthyidae, the armoured catfishes. This species is only known from its type locality of Chané, Santiesteban, in the Santa Cruz Department of Bolivia where it occurs in the basin of the Mamoré River.
