= Gastrodermus nanus =

Conservation status
- Least Concern (IUCN 3.1)

Scientific classification
- Kingdom: Animalia
- Phylum: Chordata
- Class: Actinopterygii
- Order: Siluriformes
- Family: Callichthyidae
- Genus: Gastrodermus
- Species: G. nanus

Binomial name
- Gastrodermus nanus Nijssen & Isbrücker, 1967

Synonyms
- Corydoras nanus Nijssen & Isbrücker, 1967

Species of fish

Gastrodermus nanus, the little corydoras, is a species of freshwater ray-finned fish belonging to the subfamily Corydoradinae, the corys, of the family Callichthyidae, the armored catfishes. This catfish is found in the Suriname and Maroni River basins in Suriname and the Iracoubo River basin in French Guiana.

This fish has been found in creeks with a moderate current, 0.5 to 3 m wide, shallow (20 cm to 50 cm depth) with sandy to sandy-muddy bottom and not brightly illuminated. It will grow in length up to 1.7 inches (4.3 centimeters). It lives in a tropical climate in water with a 6.0 – 8.0 pH, a water hardness of 2 – 25 dGH, and a temperature range of 72–79 °F (22–26 °C). It feeds on worms, benthic crustaceans, insects, and plant matter. It lays eggs in dense vegetation and adults do not guard the eggs. In captivity, eggs have been deposited mostly on plant leaves. The female may produce up to 600 eggs.

Gastrodermus nanus coloring is usually silver with black stripes running horizontally from head to tail. Occasionally they can have amber or purple highlights in their coloring or a gray belly.

If kept as a pet, the care level is relatively easy as the fish has a peaceful temperament. The aquarium should be well planted and have many places to hide. Use round gravel or smooth sand for the aquarium because the barbels can be damaged easily. A community of at least six fish is ideal.

Corydoras nanus is of commercial importance in the aquarium trade industry.

== See also ==
- List of freshwater aquarium fish species
