= Gastrodermus undulatus =

Conservation status
- Least Concern (IUCN 3.1)

Scientific classification
- Kingdom: Animalia
- Phylum: Chordata
- Class: Actinopterygii
- Order: Siluriformes
- Family: Callichthyidae
- Genus: Gastrodermus
- Species: G. undulatus

Binomial name
- Gastrodermus undulatus (Regan, 1912)

Synonyms
- Corydoras undulatus Regan, 1912

Species of fish

Gastrodermus undulatus, the wavy catfish, is a species of freshwater ray-finned fish belonging to the subfamily Corydoradinae, the corys, of the family Callichthyidae, the armored catfishes. This catfish is found in the lower Paraná River basin and coastal rivers in southern Brazil and Argentina.

The fish will grow in length up to 1.7 inches (4.3 centimeters). It lives in a tropical climate in water with a 6.0–8.0 pH, a water hardness of 2–25 dGH, and a temperature range of 72–79 °F (22–26 °C). However, this information is unverified by international catfish research groups, who have not been able to confirm these parameters.

It feeds on worms, benthic crustaceans, insects, and plant matter. It lays eggs in dense vegetation and adults do not guard the eggs.

== See also ==
- List of freshwater aquarium fish species
