= Sixray corydoras =

Conservation status
- Least Concern (IUCN 3.1)

Scientific classification
- Kingdom: Animalia
- Phylum: Chordata
- Class: Actinopterygii
- Order: Siluriformes
- Family: Callichthyidae
- Genus: Gastrodermus
- Species: G. pauciradiatus

Binomial name
- Gastrodermus pauciradiatus (S. H. Weitzman & Nijssen, 1970)

Synonyms
- Corydoras pauciradiatus Weitzman & Nijssen, 1970; Aspidoras pauciradiatus (Weitzman & Nijssen, 1970)

Species of fish

The sixray corydoras (Gastrodermus pauciradiatus) or false corydoras is a tropical freshwater fish belonging to the Corydoradinae sub-family of the family Callichthyidae. It originates in inland waters in South America, and is found in the upper Araguaia River basin in Brazil.

The fish will grow in length up to 2.9 centimetres (1.1 in). It lives in a tropical climate in water with a pH of 6.0 – 7.2, a water hardness of 12 dGH, and a temperature range of 22–25 °C (72–77 °F). It feeds on worms, benthic crustaceans, insects, and plant matter. It lays eggs in dense vegetation and adults do not guard the eggs.

The sixray corydoras is of commercial importance in the aquarium trade industry.

== See also ==
- List of freshwater aquarium fish species
