= Guapore corydoras =

Conservation status
- Least Concern (IUCN 3.1)

Scientific classification
- Kingdom: Animalia
- Phylum: Chordata
- Class: Actinopterygii
- Order: Siluriformes
- Family: Callichthyidae
- Genus: Gastrodermus
- Species: G. guapore

Binomial name
- Gastrodermus guapore (Knaack, 1961)

Synonyms
- Corydoras guapore Knaack, 1961

Species of fish

The Guapore corydoras (Gastrodermus guapore) is a species of freshwater ray-finned fish belonging to the subfamily Corydoradinae, the corys, of the family Callichthyidae, the armoured catfishes. This species is found in the Guaporé River basin in Brazil. It is named for the river to which it is native.

The fish grows up to 1.6 in (4.1 cm) long. It lives in a tropical climate in water with a 6.0–8.0 pH, a water hardness of 2–25 dGH, and a temperature range of 70–75 °F (21–24 °C). It feeds on worms, benthic crustaceans, insects, and plant matter. It lays eggs in dense vegetation and adults do not guard the eggs.

The Guapore corydoras is of commercial importance in the aquarium trade industry.

== See also ==
- List of freshwater aquarium fish species
