= Gastrodermus paucerna =

Conservation status
- Least Concern (IUCN 3.1)

Scientific classification
- Kingdom: Animalia
- Phylum: Chordata
- Class: Actinopterygii
- Order: Siluriformes
- Family: Callichthyidae
- Genus: Gastrodermus
- Species: G. paucerna

Binomial name
- Gastrodermus paucerna (Knaack, 2004)

Synonyms
- Corydoras paucerna Knaack, 2004

Species of fish

Gastrodermus paucerna, the cuddly cory, is a species of freshwater ray-finned fish belonging to the subfamily Corydoradinae, the corys, of the family Callichthyidae, the armored catfishes. This catfish is found in the Iténez River basin in Bolivia.
