= Gastrodermus mamore =

Conservation status
- Data Deficient (IUCN 3.1)

Scientific classification
- Kingdom: Animalia
- Phylum: Chordata
- Class: Actinopterygii
- Order: Siluriformes
- Family: Callichthyidae
- Genus: Gastrodermus
- Species: G. mamore

Binomial name
- Gastrodermus mamore (Knaack, 2002)

Synonyms
- Corydoras mamore Knaack, 2002

Species of fish

Gastrodermus mamore, the Marmore cory, is a species of freshwater ray-finned fish belonging to the subfamily Corydoradinae, the corys, of the family Callichthyidae, the armoured catfishes. This species is endemic to Bolivia where it is known only from its type locality of the Ibare River, part of the Mamoré River system, Moxos in Beni Department.
