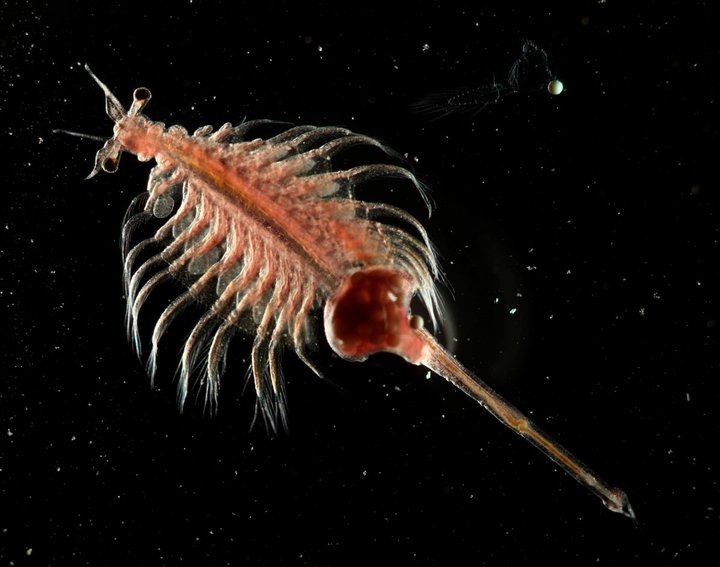

Scientific classification
- Kingdom: Animalia
- Phylum: Arthropoda
- Class: Branchiopoda
- Order: Anostraca
- Family: Artemiidae
- Genus: Artemia
- Species: A. parthenogenetica

Binomial name
- Artemia parthenogenetica Bowen and Sterling, 1978

= Artemia parthenogenetica =

Species of small freshwater animal

Artemia parthenogenetica is a species of brine shrimp – aquatic crustaceans belonging to a different class, the Branchiopoda, than the true shrimps.

== Taxonomy ==
The name Artemia parthenogenetica is widely used in the relevant literature, although some taxonomists regard it as being used incorrectly to refer to parthenogenetic populations of Artemia that do not form a true species. A 2015 study based on microsatellite markers showed that parthenogenetic populations of different ploidy levels group together in a principal component analysis, and are distinct from related species such as Artemia sinica, Artemia tibetiana and Artemia urmiana.

== Description ==
A. parthenogenetica is an obligate parthenogenetic organism that is found in Europe, Africa, and Asia, from the Canary Islands in the far west of its known range, east to Australia. It lives in hypersaline water bodies mostly along coastal waters of these continents. In Australia, scientists are debating whether the organism is native or introduced from birds. In inland Australia, genetic information indicates that populations have been introduced by migratory birds. As A. parthenogenetica can more favorably survive in high salinities, when large bodies of water dry out, the introductions of cysts by migrating birds from coastal regions may allow populations to become established, as happened in the South Aral Sea in the late 1990s.

== Life cycle ==
A. parthenogenetica, as its specific name suggests, is an obligate parthenogenetic organism, one that reproduces without sexual reproduction. Like other brine shrimp, A. parthenogenetica produces cysts that are highly resistant to environmental changes, including large changes in temperature and salinity, and the stress of drying out and exposure to UV radiation. The organism displays different numbers of chromosomes or levels of ploidy, from diploid to 5n. A. parthenogenetica populations with 2n ploidy have some recombination of genes during meiosis then fuse the recombined cells to regain the 2n chromosomes. In populations with ploidies from 3n to 5n, the resultant offspring are clones of the parents.

== Automixis ==
Diploid A. parthenogenetica can undergo meiosis, but instead of producing haploid gametes as ordinarily occurs in sexual species, diploid meiotic products are most often produced by automixis. Automixis involves the fusion of nuclei derived from the same individual meiosis. The specific type of automixis occurring in A. partheogenetica is likely "central fusion", that is fusion of the first two meiotic products (see Figure in Automixis). Automixis allows A. parthenogenetica to reproduce parthenogenetically. However, despite its species designation as "parthenogentica" implying obligate parthenogenesis, recent evidence indicates that this species is also capable of infrequently reproducing sexually.
