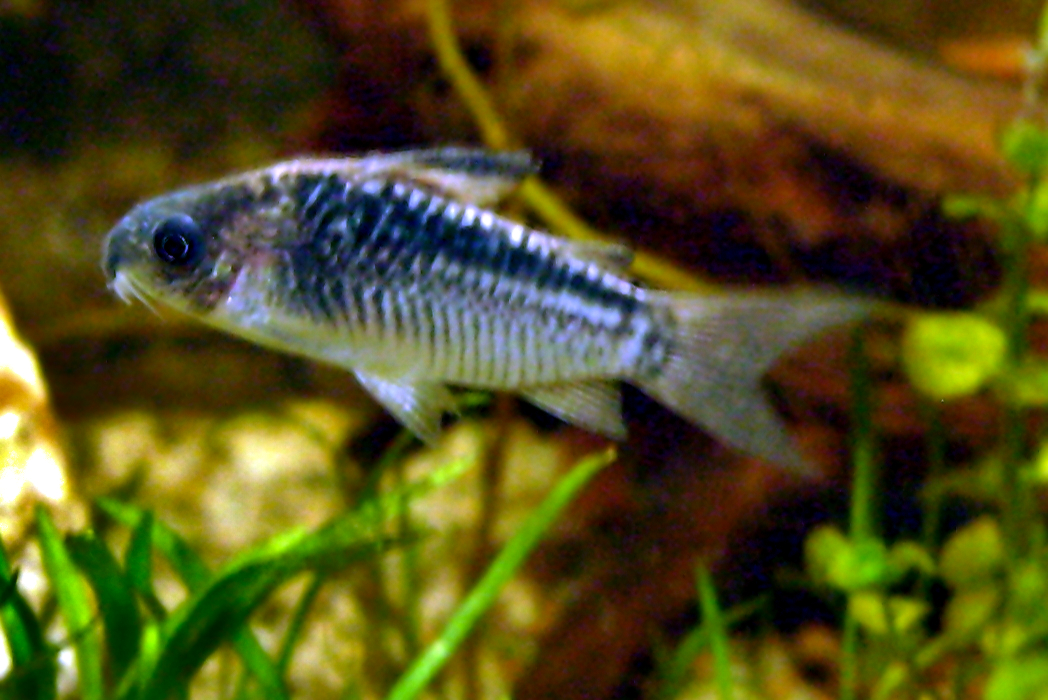
- Elegant corydoras (Gastrodermus elegans)

Scientific classification
- Kingdom: Animalia
- Phylum: Chordata
- Class: Actinopterygii
- Order: Siluriformes
- Family: Callichthyidae
- Subfamily: Corydoradinae
- Genus: Gastrodermus; Cope, 1878

Type species
- Corydoras elegans Steindachner, 1876

Synonyms
- Microcorydoras Myers, 1953

= Gastrodermus =

Genus of fishes

Gastrodermus is a genus of freshwater ray-finned fishes belonging to the subfamily Corydoradinae, the corys, of the family Callichthyidae, the armoured catfishes. The catfishes in this genus are found in South America.

== Taxonomy ==
Gastrodermus was first proposed as a genus in 1878 by the American paleontologist and biologist Edward Drinker Cope with Corydoras elegans, a species described in 1872 by Franz Steindachner from the Amazon of Brazil, designated as its type species by William Alonzo Gosline III in 1940. For a long period this taxon was regarded as a synonym of Corydoras but it was resurrected as a valid genus by a phylogenomic analysis published in 2025. This genus is classified in the subfamily Corydoradinae of the armoured catfish family Callichtyidae in the suborder Loricarioidei in the catfish order Siluriformes.

== Etymology ==
Gastrodermus combines gaster, meaning "belly", with derma, which means "skin". These fishes do not have the coracoid bones enclosing the ventral region, unlike most of their former congeners in Corydoras.

== Species ==
Gastrodermus contains the following valid species:

- Gastrodermus bilineatus (Knaack, 2002)
- Gastrodermus elegans (Steindachner, 1876)
- Gastrodermus gracilis (Nijssen & Isbrücker, 1976)
- Gastrodermus guapore (Knaack, 1961)
- Gastrodermus hastatus (C. H. Eigenmann & R. S. Eigenmann, 1888)
- Gastrodermus latus (Pearson, 1924)
- Gastrodermus mamore (Knaack, 2002)
- Gastrodermus nanus (Nijssen & Isbrücker, 1967)
- Gastrodermus napoensis (Nijssen & Isbrücker, 1986)
- Gastrodermus nijsseni (Sands, 1989)
- Gastrodermus paucerna (Knaack, 2004)
- Gastrodermus pauciradiatus (Weitzman & Nijssen, 1970)
- Gastrodermus pygmaeus (Knaack, 1966)
- Gastrodermus undulatus (Regan, 1912)
