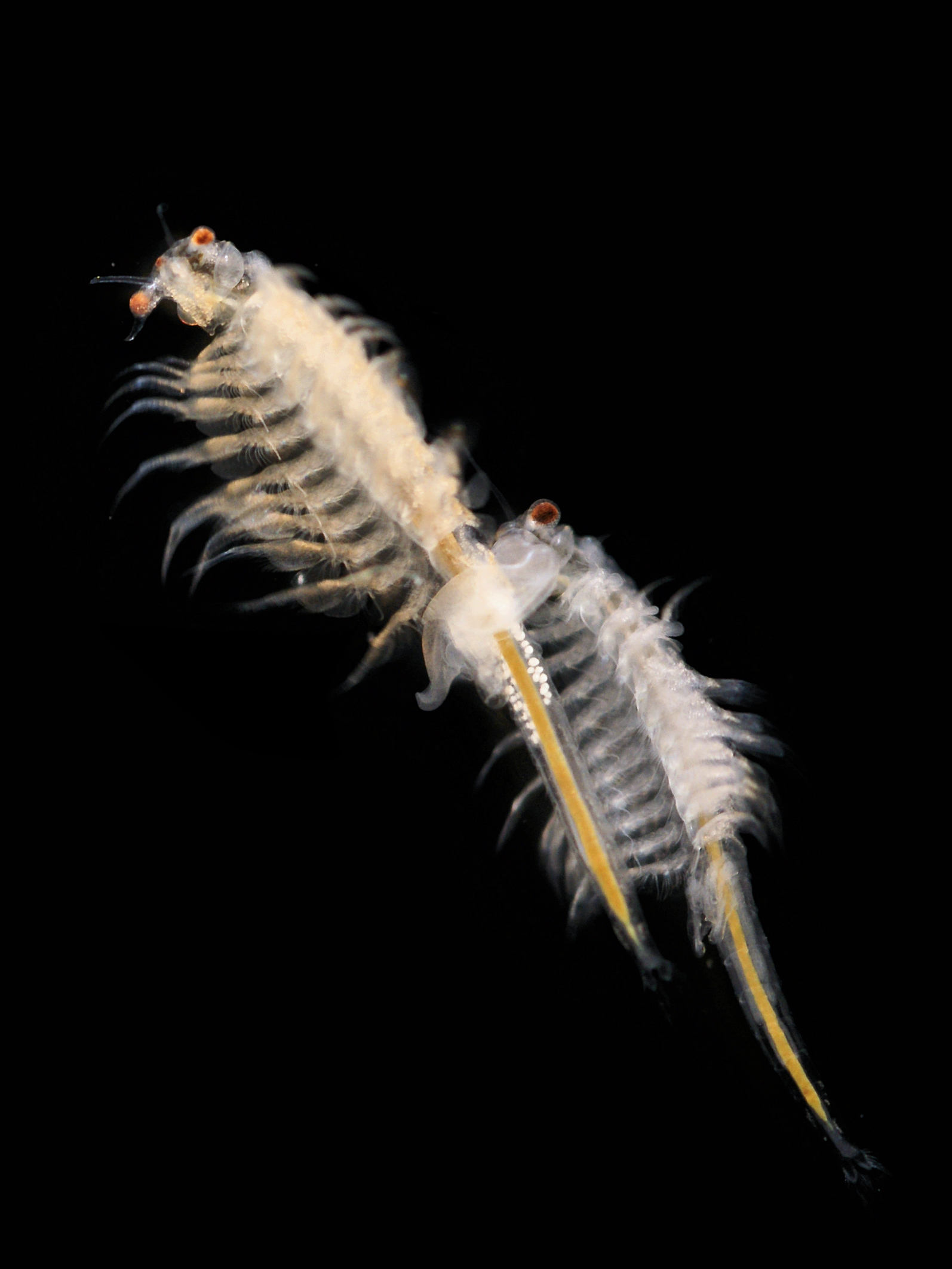

Scientific classification
- Kingdom: Animalia
- Phylum: Arthropoda
- Clade: Pancrustacea
- Class: Branchiopoda
- Order: Anostraca
- Family: Artemiidae
- Genus: Artemia
- Species: A. salina

Binomial name
- Artemia salina (Linnaeus, 1758)

Synonyms
- Artemia tunisiana (but see text)

= Artemia salina =

Species of small brine shrimp

Artemia salina is a species of brine shrimp – aquatic crustaceans that are more closely related to Triops and cladocerans than to true shrimp. It belongs to a lineage that does not appear to have changed much in 100 million years. It is also one of the largest brine shrimp species.

Artemia salina is native to saline lakes, ponds, and temporary waters (not seas) in the Mediterranean region of Southern Europe, Anatolia, and Northern Africa. Considerable taxonomic confusion exists, and some populations elsewhere have formerly been referred to as this species, but are now recognized as separate species.

== Description ==
Adult Artemia salina have two eyes and 11 pairs of legs and can grow to about 15 mm (0.6 in) in size. Its blood contains the protein hemoglobin, which is also found in vertebrates. Males differ from females by having their second antennae markedly enlarged, and modified into clasping organs used in mating.

== Life cycle ==
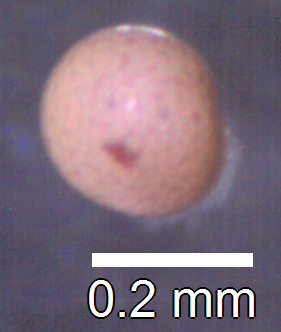
Cyst (egg)

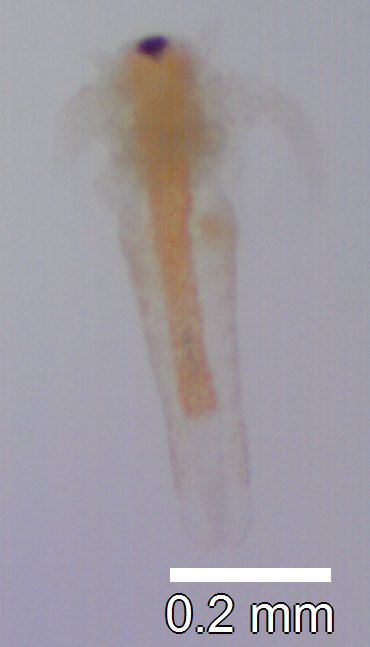
Nauplius (larva)

Males have two reproductive organs. Prior to copulation, the male clasps the female with his clasping organ, assuming a dorsal position. The claspers hold the female just anterior to the ovisac. A male and female may swim clasped together for a number of days. In this state, the movements of the swimming appendages of the pair beat in a co-ordinated fashion. The females can produce eggs either as a result of mating or via parthenogenesis. There are two types of eggs: thin-shelled eggs that hatch immediately and thick-shelled eggs, which can remain in a dormant state. These cysts can last for a number of years, and hatch when they are placed in saltwater. Thick-shelled eggs are produced when the body of water is drying out, food is scarce, and the salt concentration is rising. If the female dies, the eggs develop further. Eggs hatch into nauplii that are about 0.5 mm in length. They have a single simple eye that only senses the presence and direction of light. Nauplii swim towards the light, but adults swim away from it. Later, the two more capable eyes develop, but the initial eye also stays, resulting in three-eyed creatures.

== Ecology ==
In nature, they live in salt lakes. They are almost never found in an open sea, most likely because of the lack of food and relative defenselessness. However, Artemia species have been observed in Elkhorn Slough, California, which is connected to the sea. However, North American populations are another species, A. franciscana. Unlike most aquatic animals, Artemia swims upside down.

Artemia species can live in water having much more or much less salt content than normal seawater. They tolerate salt amounts as high as 25.0%, which is nearly a saturated solution, and can live for several days in solutions very different from sea water, such as potassium permanganate or silver nitrate, while iodide—a frequent addition to edible salt—is harmful to them. The animal's colour depends on the salt concentration, with high concentrations giving them a slightly red appearance. Artemia salina can survive for 5 hours in freshwater, while their typical lifespan is 3 months.. It feeds mainly on green algae.

In the UK, the species formerly lived in a number of salt works based around the Solent. They were observed only in the brine tanks where the concentrated salt water was held before boiling, but were probably also present in the salt pans. At least some of the salt harvesters thought they helped clean the brine and would deliberately introduce them into the tanks. With the decline of the salt works, the species became extinct in England.

== Uses ==
The resilience of these creatures makes them ideal test samples in experiments. Artemia is one of the standard organisms for testing the toxicity of chemicals including screening for insecticidal activity – being used by Blizzard et al. 1989 to screen hundreds of semisynthetic avermectins, and by Conder et al. 1992 for the Streptomyces fumanus metabolite dioxapyrrolomycin. In addition, the eggs survive for years. Their durability makes it possible to buy "Artemia growing kits" for children, containing eggs, salt, food, and most necessary tools, as well as plain packets of eggs. These have been most popularly marketed under the name Sea-Monkeys and Aqua Dragons. Shops catering for aquarists also sell frozen Artemia as fish food, and occasionally packets of eggs for aquarists to grow them as live fish food. Artemia occurs in vast numbers in the Great Salt Lake where it is commercially important. However, the brine shrimp of this lake are now believed to be another species of the same genus, Artemia franciscana.

== Taxonomy, distribution and conservation ==
Artemia salina was first described (as Cancer salinus) by Carl Linnaeus in his Systema Naturae in 1758. This was based on a report by a German named Schlosser, who had found Artemia at Lymington, England. That population is now extirpated, although specimens collected there are retained in zoological museums.

As presently defined, Artemia salina is restricted to the Mediterranean region of Southern Europe, Anatolia and Northern Africa. Some populations elsewhere have formerly been referred to as this species, but are now recognized as separate, including Artemia franciscana of the Americas. That species has been widely introduced to places outside its native range, including the Mediterranean region, where it locally outcompetes the native Artemia salina. This has already happened in parts of Portugal, Spain, France, Italy and Morocco.

An alternative taxonomic treatment is to recognize the extirpated English population as a species of its own, to which the name Artemia salina should be restricted. In that case the species native to the Mediterranean region of Southern Europe, Anatolia and Northern Africa can be referred to as Artemia tunisiana, but at present most authorities reject this treatment and consider Artemia tunisiana as a synonym of Artemia salina. Some have considered the North African population distinct and proposed that the name Artemia tunisiana should be restricted to that group, but this is contradicted by genetic evidence showing that South European and North African populations belong to the same species.
