= Streptomyces fumanus =

Scientific classification
- Domain: Bacteria
- Kingdom: Bacillati
- Phylum: Actinomycetota
- Class: Actinomycetes
- Order: Streptomycetales
- Family: Streptomycetaceae
- Genus: Streptomyces
- Species: S. fumanus

Binomial name
- Streptomyces fumanus (Sveshnikova 1957) Pridham et al. 1958 (Approved Lists 1980)

Type strain
- ATCC 19904, ATCC 25454, BCRC 12058, Bu 6,20, CBS 260.66, CBS 687.69, CCRC 12058, CGMCC 4.1732, DSM 40154, ETH 28430, IFO 13042, INA 10256 \\/54, INA 10256/54, ISP 5154, JCM 4477, KCC S-0477, LMG 19882, NBRC 13042, NRRL B-3898, NRRL B-5420, NRRL B-B-5420, NRRL-ISP 5154, RIA 1234, VKM Ac-1845

Synonyms
- "Actinomyces fumanus" Sveshnikova 1957

Species of bacterium

Streptomyces fumanus is a bacterium species from the genus of Streptomyces which has been isolated from alluvial soil. Streptomyces fumanus produces dioxapyrrolomycin (an insecticide), pyrrolomycin G, pyrrolomycin H, pyrrolomycin I, pyrrolomycin J and fumaquinone.

== See also ==
- List of Streptomyces species
