= Automixis =

Fusion of nuclei or gametes from same individual

The effects of central fusion and terminal fusion on heterozygosity

Automixis is the fusion of (typically haploid) nuclei or gametes derived from the same individual. The term covers several reproductive mechanisms, some of which are parthenogenetic.

Diploidy might be restored by the doubling of the chromosomes without cell division before meiosis begins or after meiosis is completed. This is referred to as an endomitotic cycle. This may also happen by the fusion of the first two blastomeres. Other species restore their ploidy by the fusion of the meiotic products. The chromosomes may not separate at one of the two anaphases (called restitutional meiosis) or the nuclei produced may fuse or one of the polar bodies may fuse with the egg cell at some stage during its maturation.

Some authors consider all forms of automixis sexual as they involve recombination. Many others classify the endomitotic variants as asexual and consider the resulting embryos parthenogenetic. Among these authors, the threshold for classifying automixis as a sexual process depends on when the products of anaphase I or of anaphase II are joined together. The criterion for "sexuality" varies from all cases of restitutional meiosis, to those where the nuclei fuse or to only those where gametes are mature at the time of fusion. Those cases of automixis that are classified as sexual reproduction are compared to self-fertilization in their mechanism and consequences.

The genetic composition of the offspring depends on what type of apomixis takes place. When endomitosis occurs before meiosis or when central fusion occurs (restitutional meiosis of anaphase I or the fusion of its products), the offspring get all to more than half of the mother's genetic material and heterozygosity is mostly preserved (if the mother has two alleles for a locus, it is likely that the offspring will get both). This is because in anaphase I the homologous chromosomes are separated. Heterozygosity is not completely preserved when crossing over occurs in central fusion. In the case of pre-meiotic doubling, recombination -if it happens- occurs between identical sister chromatids.

If terminal fusion (restitutional meiosis of anaphase II or the fusion of its products) occurs, a little over half the mother's genetic material is present in the offspring and the offspring are mostly homozygous. This is because at anaphase II the sister chromatids are separated and whatever heterozygosity is present is due to crossing over. In the case of endomitosis after meiosis, the offspring is completely homozygous and has only half the mother's genetic material.

This can result in parthenogenetic offspring being unique from each other and from their mother.

== Adaptive benefit of meiosis in automixis ==
The elements of meiosis that are retained in automixis in plants and animals are: (1) pairing of homologous chromosomes, (2) DNA double-strand break formation and (3) homologous recombinational repair at prophase I. These features of meiosis are considered to be adaptations for repair of DNA damage.
