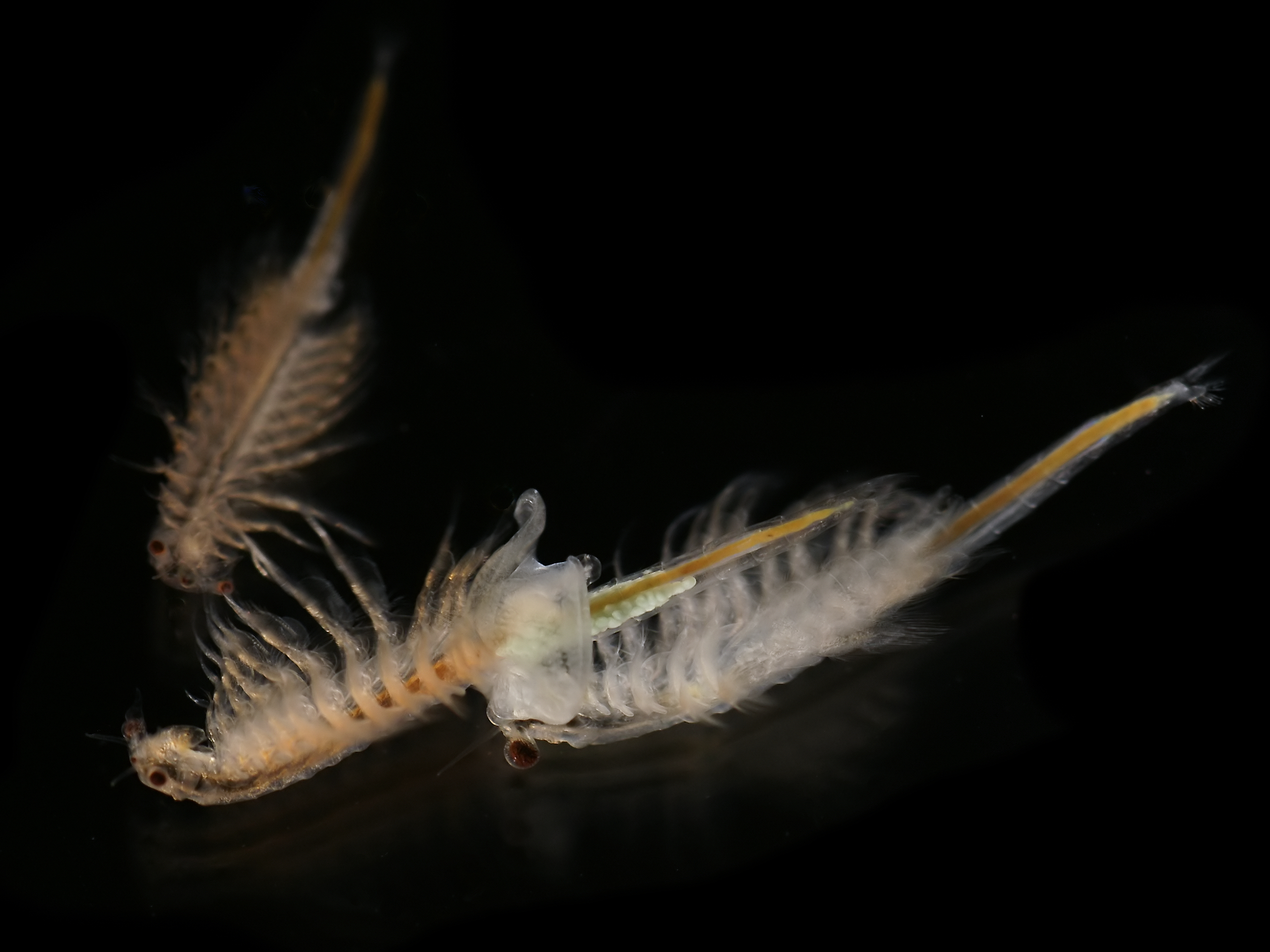
- Artemia salina mating pair – female left, male right

Scientific classification
- Kingdom: Animalia
- Phylum: Arthropoda
- Clade: Pancrustacea
- Class: Branchiopoda
- Subclass: Sarsostraca
- Order: Anostraca
- Suborder: Artemiina
- Family: Artemiidae; Grochowski, 1895
- Genus: Artemia; Leach, 1819

Type species
- Artemia salina Linnaeus, 1758

Species
- Artemia franciscana; Artemia monica; Artemia persimilis; Artemia salina; Artemia sinica; Artemia tibetiana; Artemia urmiana; Artemia amati; Artemia sorgeloosi; Parthenogenetic populations also called Artemia parthenogenetica (disputed)

= Brine shrimp =

Genus of aquatic crustaceans

Artemia is a genus of aquatic crustaceans also known as brine shrimp. It is the only genus in the family Artemiidae. The first historical record of the existence of Artemia dates back to the first half of the 10th century in Lake Urmia, Iran, with an example called an "aquatic dog" by an Iranian geographer. The first documented unambiguous record is the report and drawings made by Schlösser in 1757 of animals from Lymington, England. Artemia populations are found worldwide, typically in inland saltwater lakes, but occasionally in oceans. Artemia are able to avoid cohabiting with most types of predators, such as fish, by their ability to live in waters of very high salinity (up to 25%).

The ability of the Artemia to produce dormant eggs, known as cysts, has led to extensive use of Artemia in aquaculture. The cysts may be stored indefinitely and hatched on demand to provide a convenient form of live feed for larval fish and crustaceans. Nauplii of the brine shrimp Artemia constitute the most widely used food item, and over 2,000 metric tons (2,200 short tons) of dry Artemia cysts are marketed worldwide annually with most of the cysts being harvested from the Great Salt Lake in Utah. In addition, the resilience of Artemia makes them ideal animals for running biological toxicity assays and it has become a model organism used to test the toxicity of chemicals. Breeds of Artemia are sold as novelty gifts under the marketing name Sea-Monkeys.

== Description ==
The brine shrimp Artemia comprises a group of seven to nine species very likely to have diverged from an ancestral form living in the Mediterranean area about 5.5 million years ago, around the time of the Messinian salinity crisis.

The Laboratory of Aquaculture & Artemia Reference Center at Ghent University possesses the largest known Artemia cyst collection, a cyst bank containing over 1,700 Artemia population samples collected from different locations around the world.

Artemia is a typical primitive arthropod with a segmented body to which is attached broad leaf-like appendages. The body usually consists of 19 segments, the first 11 of which have pairs of appendages, the next two which are often fused together carry the reproductive organs, and the last segments lead to the tail. The total length is usually about 8–10 millimetres (0.31–0.39 in) for the adult male and 10–12 mm (0.39–0.47 in) for the female, but the width of both sexes, including the legs, is about 4 mm (0.16 in).

The body of Artemia is divided into head, thorax, and abdomen. The entire body is covered with a thin, flexible exoskeleton of chitin to which muscles are attached internally and which is shed periodically. In female Artemia, a moult precedes every ovulation.

For brine shrimp, many functions, including swimming, digestion and reproduction are not controlled through the brain; instead, local nervous system ganglia may control some regulation or synchronisation of these functions. Autotomy, the voluntary shedding or dropping of parts of the body for defence, is also controlled locally along the nervous system. Artemia have two types of eyes. They have two widely separated compound eyes mounted on flexible stalks. These compound eyes are the main optical sense organ in adult brine shrimps. The median eye, or the naupliar eye, is situated anteriorly in the centre of the head and is the only functional optical sense organ in the nauplii, which is functional until the adult stage.

== Ecology and behavior ==
Brine shrimp can tolerate any level of salinity between 2.5% and 25% (25–250g/L), with an optimal range of 6%–10%, occupying an ecological niche that can protect them from predators. Physiologically, optimal levels of salinity are about 3–3.5%, but due to predators at these salt levels, brine shrimp seldom occur in natural habitats at salinities of less than 6–8%. Locomotion is achieved by the rhythmic beating of the appendages acting in pairs. Respiration occurs on the surface of the legs through fibrous, feather-like plates (lamellar epipodites).

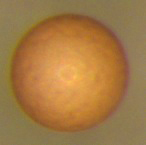
An Artemia cyst

=== Reproduction ===
Males differ from females by having the second antennae markedly enlarged, and modified into clasping organs used in mating. Adult female brine shrimp ovulate approximately every 140 hours. In favorable conditions, the female brine shrimp can produce free swimming nauplii. While in extreme conditions, such as low oxygen level or salinity above 15%, female brine shrimp produce eggs with a chorion coating which has a brown color. These eggs, also known as cysts, are metabolically inactive and can remain in total stasis for two years while in dry oxygen-free conditions, even at temperatures below freezing. This characteristic is called cryptobiosis, meaning "hidden life", and is a key factor that makes brine shrimp ideal for space aquaculture. While in cryptobiosis, brine shrimp eggs can survive temperatures of liquid air (−190 °C or −310 °F) and a small percentage can survive above boiling temperature (105 °C or 221 °F) for up to two hours. Once placed in briny (salt) water, the eggs hatch within a few hours. The nauplius larvae are less than 0.4 mm in length when they first hatch.

=== Parthenogenesis ===
The effects of central fusion and terminal fusion on heterozygosity

Parthenogenesis is a natural form of reproduction in which growth and development of embryos occur without fertilization. Thelytoky is a particular form of parthenogenesis in which the development of a female individual occurs from an unfertilized egg. Automixis is a form of thelytoky, but there are different kinds of automixis. The kind of automixis relevant here is one in which two haploid products from the same meiosis combine to form a diploid zygote.

Diploid Artemia parthenogenetica reproduce by automatic parthenogenesis with central fusion (see diagram) and low but nonzero recombination. Central fusion of two of the haploid products of meiosis (see diagram) tends to maintain heterozygosity in transmission of the genome from mother to offspring, and to minimize inbreeding depression. Low crossover recombination during meiosis likely restrains the transition from heterozygosity to homozygosity over successive generations.

=== Diet ===
In their first stage of development, Artemia do not feed but consume their own energy reserves stored in the cyst. Wild brine shrimp eat microscopic planktonic algae. Cultured brine shrimp can also be fed particulate foods including yeast, wheat flour, soybean powder or egg yolk.

== Genetics, genomics and transcriptomics ==
Artemia comprises sexually reproducing, diploid species and several obligate parthenogenetic Artemia populations consisting of different clones and ploidies (2n->5n). Several genetic maps have been published for Artemia. The past years, different transcriptomic studies have been performed to elucidate biological responses in Artemia, such as its response to salt stress, toxins, infection and diapause termination. These studies also led to various fully assembled Artemia transcriptomes. Recently, the Artemia genome was assembled and annotated, revealing a genome containing an unequaled 58% of repeats, genes with unusually long introns and adaptations unique to the extremophilic nature of Artemia in high salt and low oxygen environments. These adaptations include a unique energy-intensive endocytosis-based salt excretion strategy resembling salt excretion strategies of plants, as well as several survival strategies for extreme environments it has in common with the extremophilic tardigrade.

== Aquaculture ==
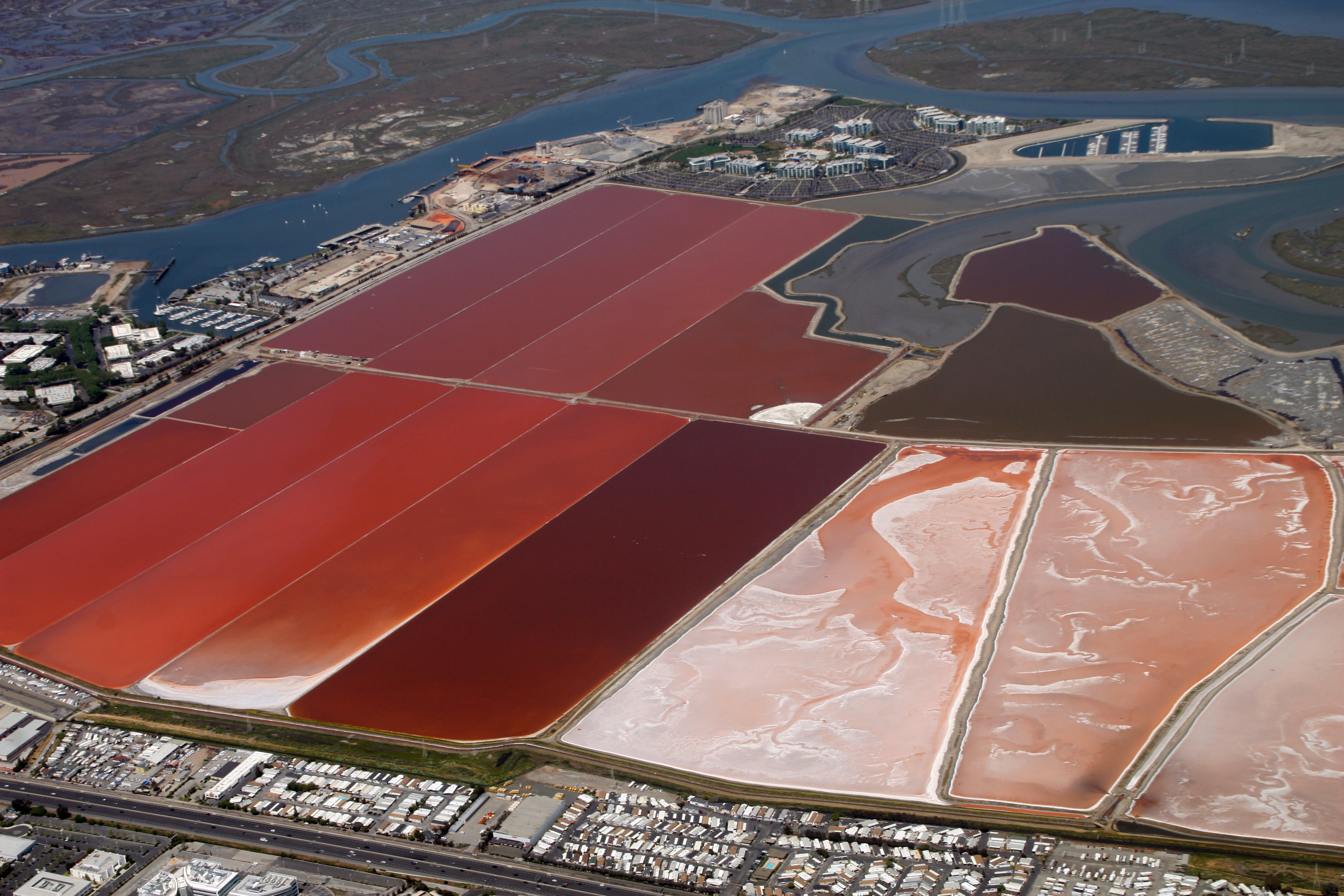
San Francisco Bay Salt Ponds

Fish farm owners search for a cost-effective, easy to use, and available food that is preferred by the fish. From cysts, brine shrimp nauplii can readily be used to feed fish and crustacean larvae just after a one-day incubation. Instar I (the nauplii that just hatched and with large yolk reserves in their body) and instar II nauplii (the nauplii after first moult and with functional digestive tracts) are more widely used in aquaculture, because they are easy for operation, rich in nutrients, and small, which makes them suitable for feeding fish and crustacean larvae live or after drying.

== Toxicity test ==
Artemia found favor as a model organism for use in toxicological assays, despite the recognition that it is too robust an organism to be a sensitive indicator species.

In pollution research Artemia, the brine shrimp, has had extensive use as a test organism and in some circumstances is an acceptable alternative to the toxicity testing of mammals in the laboratory. The fact that millions of brine shrimp are so easily reared has been an important help in assessing the effects of a large number of environmental pollutants on the shrimps under well controlled experimental conditions.

== Conservation ==
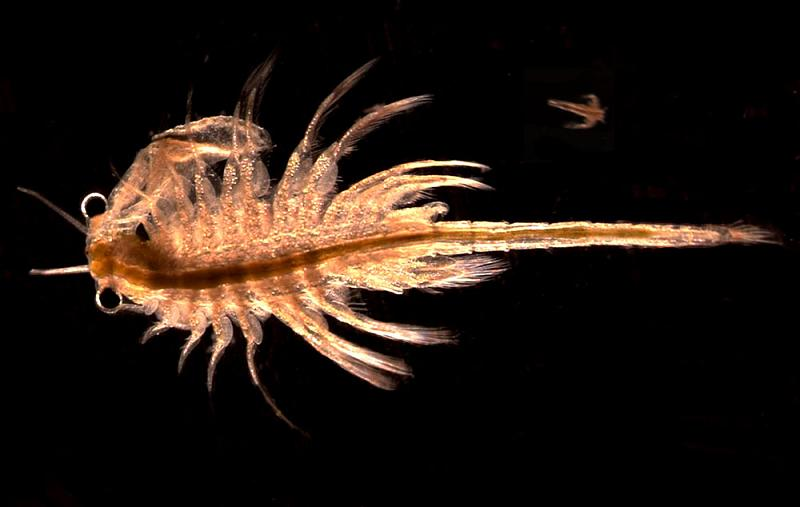
Artemia monica (male)

Overall, brine shrimp are abundant, but some populations and localized species do face threats, especially from habitat loss to introduced species. For example, A. franciscana of the Americas has been widely introduced to places outside its native range and is often able to outcompete local species, such as A. salina in the Mediterranean region.

Among the highly localized species are A. urmiana from Lake Urmia in Iran. Once abundant, the species has drastically declined due to drought, leading to fears that it was almost extinct. However, a second population of this species has recently been discovered in the Koyashskoye Salt Lake, Ukraine.

A. monica, the species commonly known as Mono Lake brine shrimp, can be found in Mono Lake, Mono County, California. In 1987, Dennis D. Murphy from Stanford University petitioned the United States Fish and Wildlife Service to add A. monica to the endangered species list under the Endangered Species Act (1973). The diversion of water by the Los Angeles Department of Water and Power resulted in rising salinity and concentration of sodium hydroxide in Mono Lake. Despite the presence of trillions of brine shrimp in the lake, the petition contended that the increase in pH would endanger them. The threat to the lake's water levels was addressed by a revision to California State Water Resources Control Board's policy, and the US Fish and Wildlife Service found on 7 September 1995 that the Mono Lake brine shrimp did not warrant listing.

== Space experiment ==
Scientists have taken the eggs of brine shrimp to outer space to test the impact of radiation on life. Brine shrimp cysts were flown on the U.S. Biosatellite 2, Apollo 16, and Apollo 17 missions, and on the Russian Bion-3 (Cosmos 782), Bion-5 (Cosmos 1129), Foton 10, and Foton 11 flights. Some of the Russian flights carried European Space Agency experiments.

On Apollo 16 and Apollo 17, the cysts traveled to the Moon and back. Cosmic rays that passed through an egg would be detected on the photographic film in its container. Some eggs were kept on Earth as experimental controls as part of the tests. Also, as the take-off in a spacecraft involves a lot of shaking and acceleration, one control group of egg cysts was accelerated to seven times the force of gravity and vibrated mechanically from side to side for several minutes so that they could experience the same violence of a rocket take-off. About 400 eggs were in each experimental group. All the egg cysts from the experiment were then placed in salt water to hatch under optimum conditions. The results showed A. salina eggs are highly sensitive to cosmic radiation; 90% of the embryos induced to develop from hit eggs died at different developmental stages.
