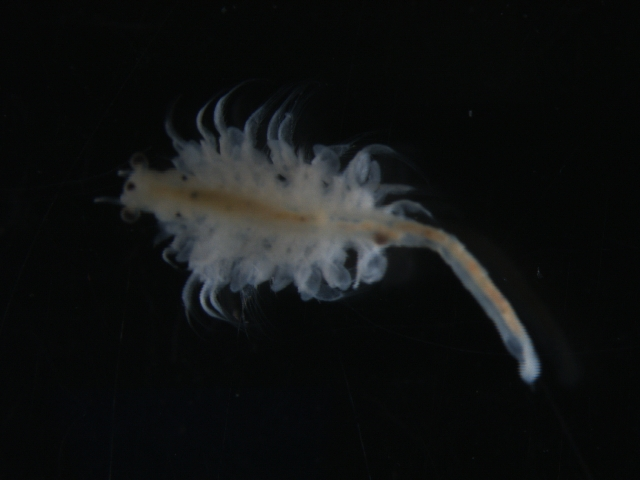

Scientific classification
- Kingdom: Animalia
- Phylum: Arthropoda
- Clade: Pancrustacea
- Class: Branchiopoda
- Order: Anostraca
- Family: Artemiidae
- Genus: Artemia
- Species: A. franciscana

Binomial name
- Artemia franciscana Kellogg, 1906

= Artemia franciscana =

Species of crustacean

The San Francisco brine shrimp (Artemia franciscana) is a species of brine shrimp endemic to the Americas but now widely introduced throughout the tropics and temperate zones worldwide. The species exhibits reproductive plasticity, using two different strategies of reproduction: oviparity (laying eggs which develop and hatch outside the body), or ovoviviparity (eggs develop and hatch inside the mother's body but is nourished by the yolk rather than placenta). They produce offspring through sexual reproduction, although their success can depend on chemical signaling and temperature.

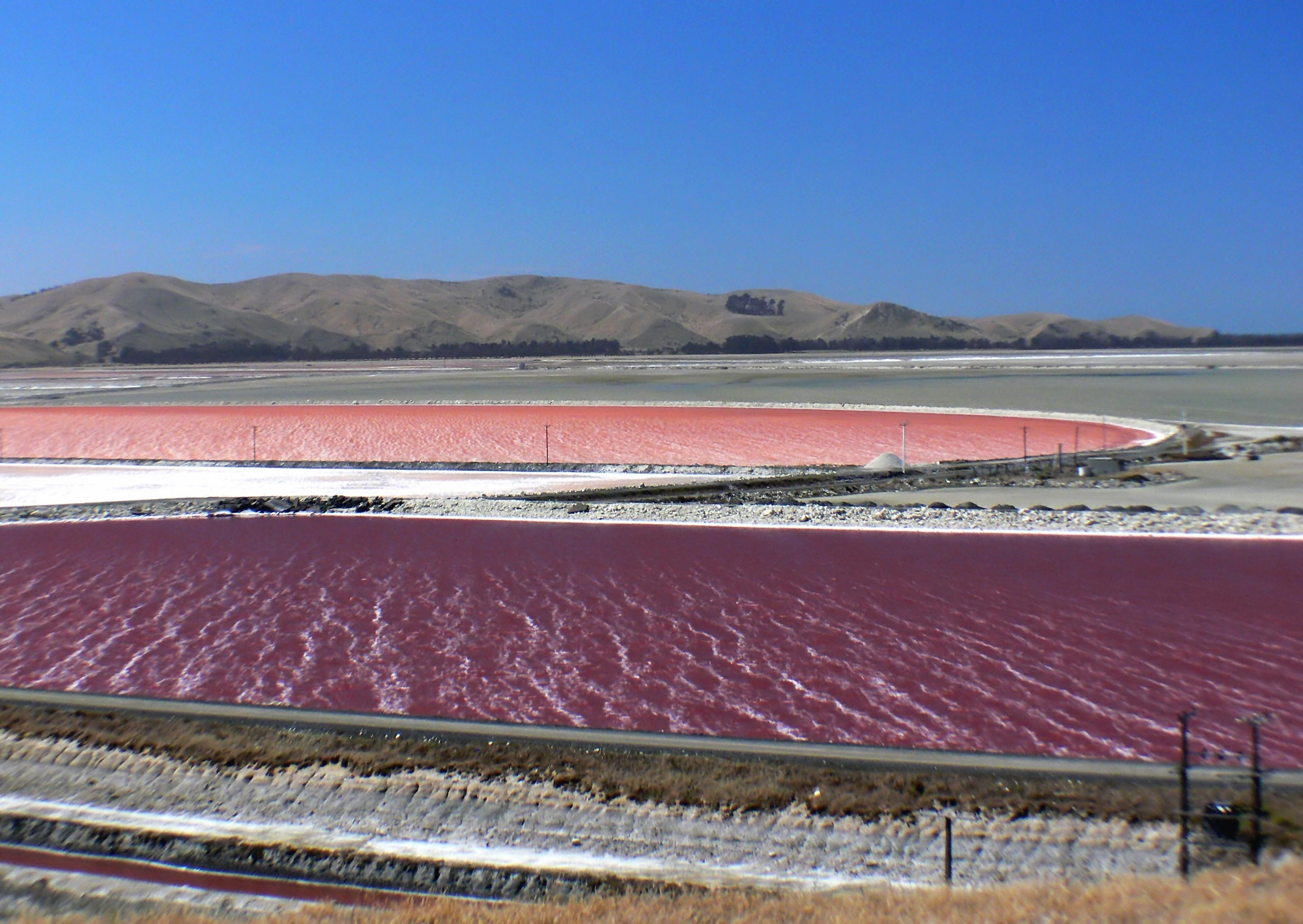
Artemia franciscana inhabit the brackish waters from salt flats in Lake Grassmere

== Distribution and habitat ==
The San Francisco brine shrimp, Artemia franciscana, is native to heavily hypersaline environments of the Americas and the Caribbean. There are large populations in both North and South America, and multiple populations are locally adopted specifically to the region. As a result of deliberate introduction for either economic or natural dispersal, they are also found in northeastern Brazil and the salt ponds of Macau, with cysts originally originating from the San Francisco Bay in California. This deliberate introduction was primarily used for the development of a shrimp industry with northeastern Brazil which has expanded to harvesting 20 tonnes of cysts annually leading to the conversion of natural habitat into shrimp ponds leading to shifts in reproductive habits of native shrimp populations posing potential threats to the ecosystem in Brazil.

== Life cycle ==
A. franciscana has a short generation time. Maturity is reached in 15 molts, all occurring in less than 20 days. Females present fecundity rates of up to 250 embryos per brood (and up to 20 broods per lifespan). This organism reproduces sexually, and it may have multiple living generations at once.

== Evolution ==
A. franciscana has longer chromosomes and more heterochromatin compared to other Artemia species. Research shows that because of these apomorphic features, A. franciscana inhabits a wider geographic region, causing an increase in rapid colonization and life history plasticity.

== Population genetics ==
Male mating success has been positively correlated with heterozygosity, as heterozygous individuals often have lower metabolic costs, this happens due to a physiological advantage, as heterozygous males often have lower metabolic costs and are more genetically diverse. Therefore, they have more energy dedicated to mating with their partners. However, there is no difference in speed of mating, as homozygous and heterozygous males have the same rate of mating; rather, they differ in frequency. Studies show that heterozygous males drive the evolution of the species, as they are better competitors and more genetically diverse.

== Reproduction strategies ==
A. franciscana uses two different reproductive strategies: through oviparity (laying eggs which develop and hatch outside the body), or ovoviviparity (eggs develop and hatch inside the mother's body but is nourished by the yolk rather than placenta). A. franciscana allocates energy into gamete and offspring production, as the quality of the zygote will determine the survival.

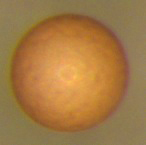
Artemia franciscana cyst

=== Oviparity ===
Females that utilize oviparity maintain embryos that are provided with a thick shell from the shell gland of a female and enter a period of dormancy. This allows the embryo to hatch later on, depending on ideal environmental conditions. It provides them an evolutionary advantage, and can result in overlapping generations. It can also result in the ability to produce eggs to survive and hatch later, in response to extreme or stressful environments, ensuring the next generation continues. Oviparity is triggered by extreme salinity and temperature, hypoxia, lack of food, short photoperiods, among other stressors. Food availability significantly influences reproductive strategy as lower food levels will tend to favor oviparity(reproduction through cysts).

=== Ovoviviparity ===
Ovoviviparity involves embryos developing inside eggs which are retained within the mother's body, hatching internally before live birth. As food abundance increased, A. franciscana shifted toward ovoviviparity for offspring production. This suggests that A. franciscana reproductive behavior depends on salinity and temperature.

== Mating and behavior ==
=== Mating behavior ===
A. franciscana produces offspring through sexual reproduction. The mating process in A. franciscana has multiple steps:

A. franciscana will first identify a potential mate, and move towards the potential mate. It will use tactical cues by making contact between the antennae and antennules to touch the female's genital region. This marks the initial contact in the mating process. Next, males will use claspers, or specialized secondary antennas, in order to latch onto the female mate. A process called intromission happens, marked by the joining of reproductive organs. This leads to the transfer of genetic materials between the two organisms. The process of intromission will only be successful if the female is ready to mate. This process is called the receptive condition, and it consists of a female carrying mature unfertilized eggs in her pouches and an empty ovisac.

=== Courtship behavior ===
Male A. franciscana exhibit four different courtship patterns. (1) Approach and touch strategy where the male explores for a female and touches her body with his clasper. (2) Male swimming behind the female, the male follows the female in a specific orientation without physical contact. (3) Riding attempt, where the male tries to grasp the female, but may be dislodged if she moves suddenly. (4) Riding success, defined where males successfully grasp onto the female shrimp, swims together for five minutes and copulates.

There are different pathways and strategies for achieving a successful mating bond. In one, the male will start with the approach and touch courtship pattern, then attempt riding, finally reaching riding success. This was the strategy found to be most common in male A. franciscana. A less commonly observed strategy was moving from the approach and touch courtship pattern to swimming behind which lead to riding success.

=== Chemical courtship behavior ===
It has been observed that female A. franciscana will release semiochemicals (chemical signals) in order to communicate with male A. franciscana to signal courtship availability. The study utilized a controlled laboratory setting and extracted chemical cues from virgin females. Pseudo females were created by soaking males in a polar solution of the sexual semiochemicals. As a result, virgin females and pseudo females had the same frequency of courtship patterns. Compared to the controlled males, the pseudo females exhibited more courtship behavior, as more males attempted to mate with them. These chemical interactions are understood to occur in the wild.

Sexual semiochemicals provide long range contact with males, as compared to the swim behind and touch strategy, which is a shorter form range of contact.

=== Mate size assortment behavior ===
Mating size assortment was observed in A. franciscana in ideal temperatures (24 °C), and was less frequently observed in extreme temperatures, leading researchers to believe that mating patterns are altered by temperature. In an attempt to maximize reproductive success, males will choose larger females, and in turn females prefer mating with large males.

Males were found to prefer mating with larger females at moderate temperatures, however, at extremely high temperatures this preference for certain traits disappeared. It was noted that at 20 °C, and 25 °C mating had size assortative parking based mating. Selection strength on body size was high in females, which means that males target larger mating partners as they will have larger Brood sacs and the ability to carry more eggs. At higher temperatures near 30 °C, mating was non size assortment. Studies concluded that as temperatures rise due to global warming, sexual selection will become less dependent on size.

== Ecology and adaptions ==
=== Co-evolution ===
As mentioned above, A. franciscana will develop eggs that have the ability to hatch later based on environmental conditions. While A. franciscana populations often feature co-occurring generations, females survived significantly better when mating with contemporary males (males born from their own year) compared to those from the past or future. Females mated with non-contemporary males experienced a 3% to 12% decrease in survival. Due to co-evolution, contemporary males perform better when competing with noncontemporary males. It is hypothesized by Rode et al. that sexual co-evolution, in which phenotypic traits oscillate periodically over time, can occur through a frequency change of existing alleles. The study aligns with the functioning selection dynamics as females had higher survival rates when mated with contemporary males, and mating with non contemporary males lead to a decrease in female survival. This shows that females are better adapted to mate with males in their own generation.

=== Sexual conflict ===
Studies suggest that the clasping strategy of males aids in competition with other males in order to reproduce with females. The clasping mechanism serves to increase a male's chance to reproduce, and prevents them from not mating entirely. Males will attempt to clasp onto and mate with females that carry fertilized eggs. They even sometimes attempt to mate with other species, such as Artemia Salina, and Artemia Persimilis. Sexual dimorphisms may arise where males have enlarged secondary antennas used to clasp organs during mating. This suggests that mating is governed by mate choice, intersexual competition or both.

Female behavior shows that they acquire their own resources and therefore do not depend on the male mate; they only provide the fertilization of the egg so females have free choice among all males. Females exercise this choice by moving away or using energetic movements to interrupt the amplexus. Females do not accept every male, since prolonged clasping is likely behaviorally costly for the female, potentially interfering with foraging. This method allows them to select for larger males, though this preference, as mentioned above, is not as prevalent at higher temperatures.

== Climate ==
=== Optimum reproduction temperature ===
A. franciscana exhibits significant developmental plasticity, with life history traits and reproductive patterns shifting in response to environmental temperatures changes. Changes in temperature can have effects on the expression of fitness trait, and have major effects such as life history, length of reproduction, lifespan, brood size, and total offspring production. A. franciscana is the most tolerant of a wide range of temperatures out of several different brine shrimp species. However, they are not immune to the differences in offspring quality, mating quality, and behavior during unideal temperatures because of the fact that they are an ectotherm. At higher temperature ranges, such as in 32 °C, Artemia franciscana were still able to reproduce, but reproductive periods accounted for a smaller percentage of their lifespans when compared to optimal mating at 24 °C.

Studies have concluded that the relationship between temperature and reproductive period is parabolic, meaning it achieved its maximum reproductive period at the mid-temperature (24 °C) and had shorter reproductive spans at both extreme temperatures 15 °C and 30 °C. Female lifespan and temperature held a linear relationship as lifespan shortened consistently as the water temperature increased.

Another study found that advanced sexual maturity and increased mortality rates were proportional to increases in temperature. It is hypothesized that mortality rates are related to rising temperatures because of additional developmental stress. This mortality may be caused by accelerated metabolism, in response to rising temperatures. It suggests that as water temperatures increased, oxygen consumption also increased.

=== Climate change ===
Because A. Franciscana are able to adapt to the higher temperatures, it will be harder for scientists to predict how they will evolve in the face of long-term climate change. Given their adaptability in phenotypic plasticity, this can provide a sufficient buffer for increased temperature resilience.

== Protein Biology ==
Several late embryogenesis abundant proteins have been identified in this species. For example, group three LEA proteins are found in the embryos of A. franciscana, where they are known to have structural and protective capabilities for the organism. See Menze et al., 2009, Sharon et al., 2009, Hand et al., 2007 and Chen et al., 2009 for more on LEA proteins in A. franciscana.
