= April 1926 =

Month of 1926

<<	April 1926					>>
Su	Mo	Tu	We	Th	Fr	Sa
				1	2	3
4	5	6	7	8	9	10
11	12	13	14	15	16	17
18	19	20	21	22	23	24
25	26	27	28	29	30

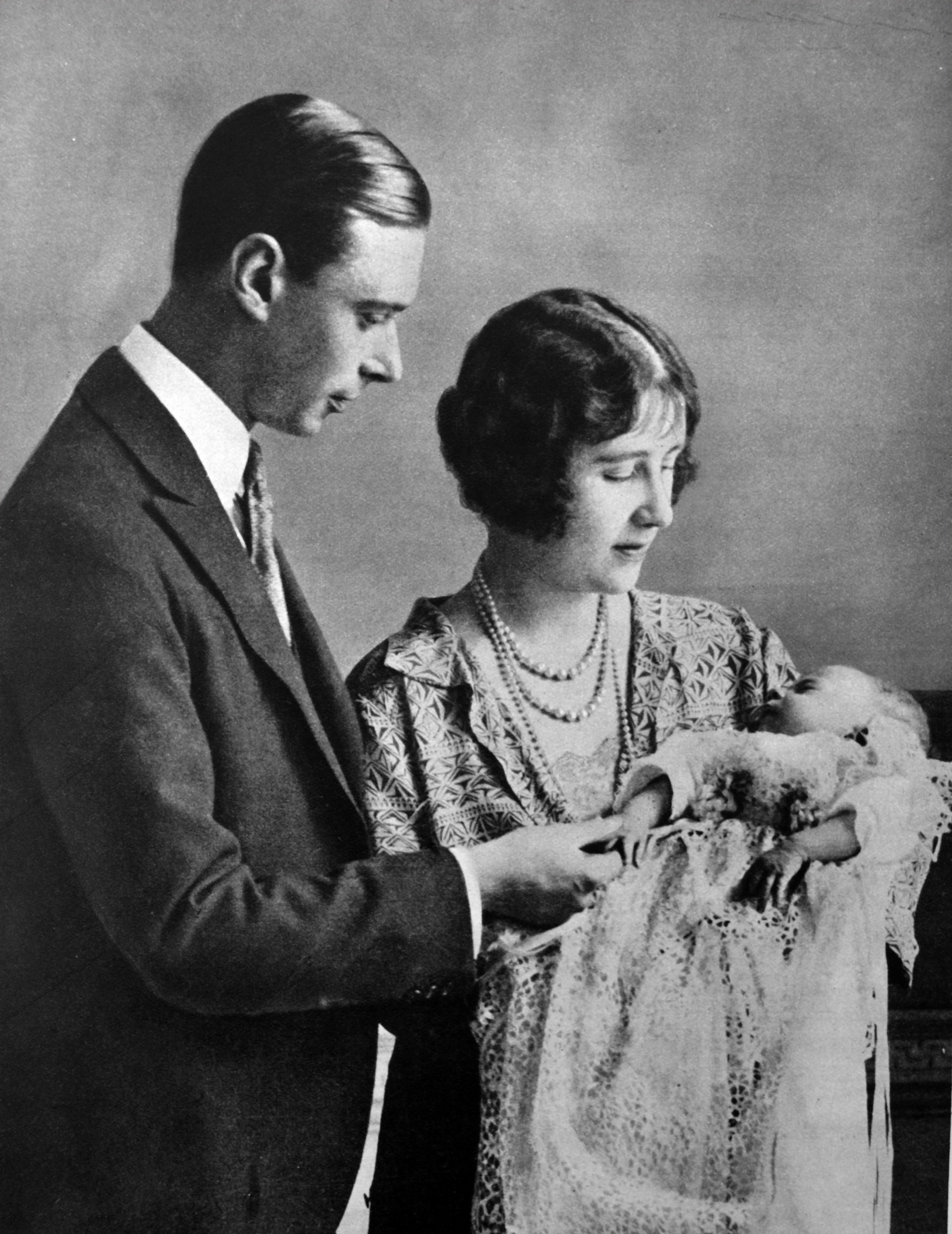
April 21, 1926: The future Queen Elizabeth II, ruler of the United Kingdom from 1952 to 2022, is born to the future King George VI and the Queen Mother Elizabeth, Duchess of York

The following events occurred in April 1926:

== April 1, 1926 (Thursday) ==
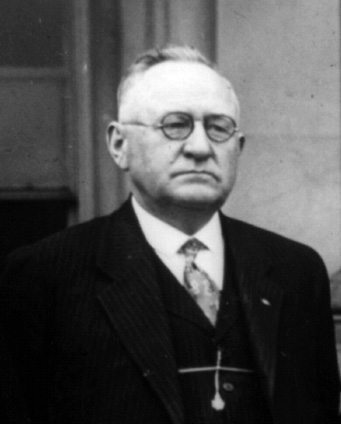
Judge English

- The U.S. House of Representatives voted, 306 to 60, to impeach U.S. District Judge George W. English on five articles of impeachment, including abuse of his powers and three arising from suspected violations of the bankruptcy laws. After the U.S. Senate began the impeachment trial, Judge English would resign on November 4, 1926, as a prerequisite for dismissal of the charges against him.
- The Transjordan Frontier Force (TJFF) was formed at Sarafand as a paramilitary border guard for the Emirate of Transjordan (now the Kingdom of Jordan), which had been created from the British Mandate for Palestine.
- Born:
  - Charles Bressler, American tenor; in Kingston, Pennsylvania (d. 1996)
  - Anne McCaffrey, American science fiction and fantasy novelist; in Cambridge, Massachusetts (d. 2011)
- Died: Jacob Pavlovich Adler, 71, Russian actor

== April 2, 1926 (Friday) ==
- In British India, rioting between Hindus and Muslims broke out in Calcutta. As many as 50 people were killed before the rioting subsided after six days.
- The Australian steamer SS Dorrigo sank off the coast of Queensland near Fraser's Island (now K'gari), along with 22 of its 24 crew, while traveling from Brisbane to Thursday Island.
- Former Irish Prime Minister Éamon de Valera, who had recently split with the Sinn Féin party and led fellow members of parliament to form a new organization, proposed the name "Fianna Fáil" for the organization scheduled to organize on May 16. The name was representative of "Fianna" (soldiers) and the Lia Fáil, the coronation stone for the ancient kings of Ireland.
- Residents of the municipality of Watts, California, voted 1,338 to 535 to become part of the city of Los Angeles with the consolidation taking effect on June 1, 1926. The proposal had been endorsed by Mayor L. A. Edwards. In the 1940s, Watts would become a predominantly African-American section of Los Angeles and would gain fame as the cite of the Watts riots in 1965 and the Rodney King riots in 1992.
- The White House announced that U.S. President Calvin Coolidge had declined an invitation to send American delegates to a League of Nations conference in Geneva to discuss America's reservations about joining the World Court.
- Born:
  - Jack Brabham, Australian Formula One racing driver, and a three-time World Drivers' Champion in 1959, 1960 and 1966; in Hurstville, New South Wales (d. 2014)
  - Sylvia Thorpe (pen name for June Sylvia Thimblethorpe), British romance novelist; in London (d. 2023)

== April 3, 1926 (Saturday) ==
- Lord Halifax took office as the new Viceroy of British India, succeeding Rufus Isaacs, 1st Marquess of Reading.
- In the Republic of China, warplanes of the Manchurian warlord Zhang Zuolin began bombing the portions of Beijing held by the Guominjun paramilitary group, led by Feng Yuxiang.
- The Italian company Agip (Azienda generale italiana petroli or Italian General Petroleum Company), a petroleum and petrochemical product and sales business, was founded in Italy by decree of the Italian royal government, with Ettore Conti as its first president.
- Italy's reorganization of the Italian Senate and the Chamber of Deputies into a syndicalist bicameral parliament, with senators appointed for life, and deputies who represented corporate associations and labor unions appointed for 9-year terms, was approved by the King of Italy. the Chamber had approved the change four days earlier.
- Born:
  - Gus Grissom, American astronaut who served on the Mercury 4, Gemini 3 and Apollo 1 space missions, and the first American to "walk in space"; in Mitchell, Indiana (killed in the Apollo 1 fire, 1967
  - Joe Steffy, American college football star for the U.S. Military Academy, and member of the College Football Hall of Fame, known for being maimed in the Korean War before he could attempt professional football; in Chattanooga, Tennessee (d. 2011)|

== April 4, 1926 (Sunday) ==
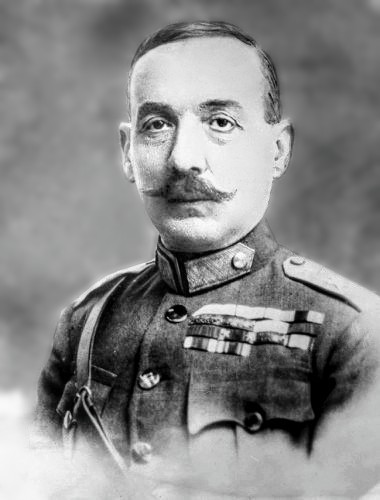
General Pangalos

- Greek dictator Theodoros Pangalos won the Greek Republic's presidential election with 93.3% of the vote or 782,589 altogether. The only rival candidate, Konstantinos Demertzis, had withdrawn before the vote but remained on the ballot and received 56,126 votes, with turnout light and the result a foregone conclusion.
- Italy's national basketball team played its first game, a 23 to 17 win in Milan over the France national team.
- Martial law was declared in Calcutta (British India) as rioting continued there.
- Died: August Thyssen, 83, co-founder and majority owner of the German steel manufacturing corporation Thyssen AG since its founding in 1891. He was succeeded by his son Fritz Thyssen.

== April 5, 1926 (Monday) ==
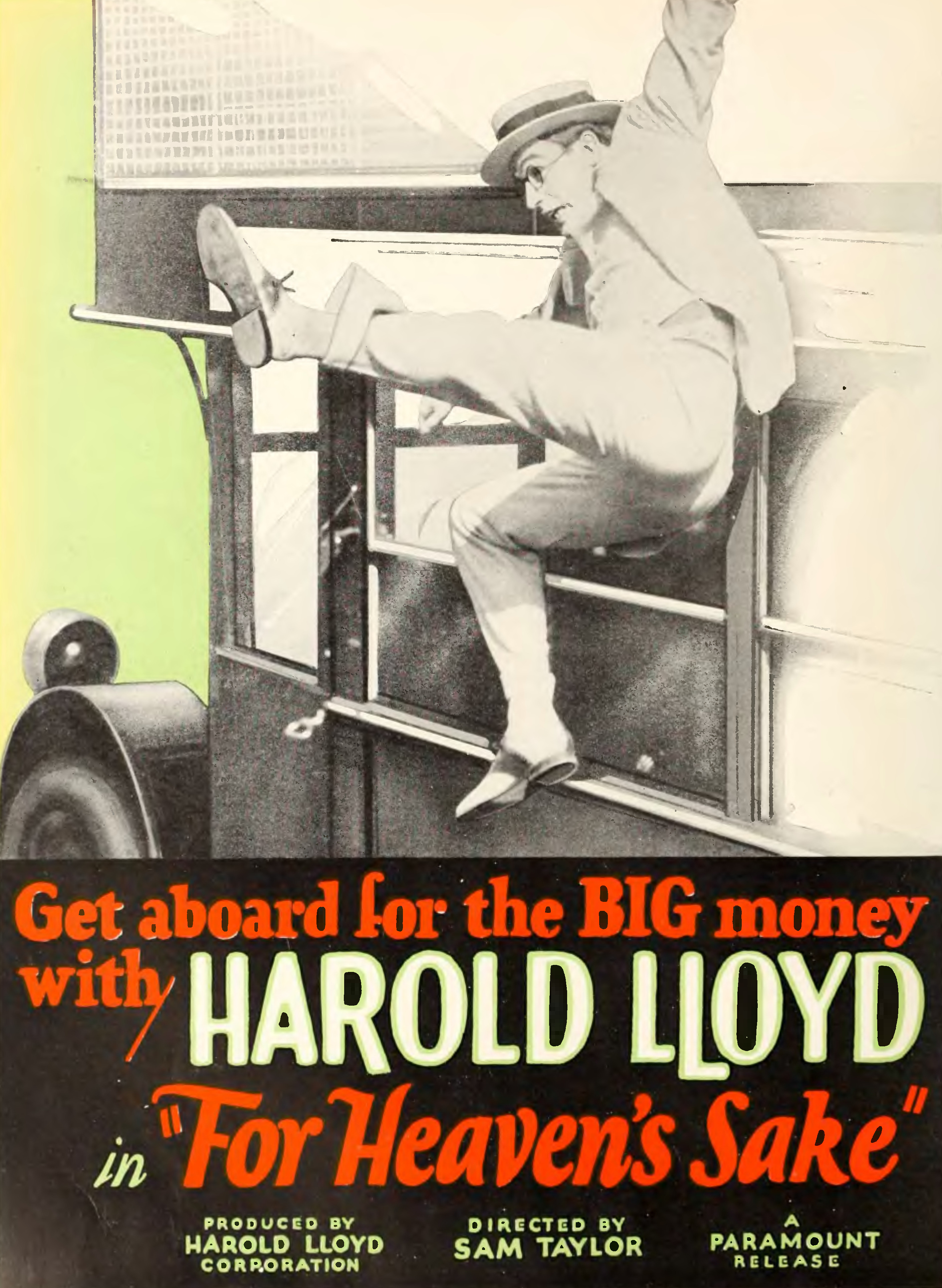

- The Harold Lloyd comedy film For Heaven's Sake, which would become the highest-grossing film of the year, premiered in the United States.
- Bulgaria was reported to be in the midst of economic crisis, with businesses failing throughout the country and unemployment around 11%.
- In voting in Liechtenstein for the 15-seats in the Landtag, the Christian-Social People's Party, led by Gustav Schädler, retained its majority of 9 seats .

== April 6, 1926 (Tuesday) ==
- The Montreal Maroons of the National Hockey League beat the Victoria Cougars of the Western Canada Hockey League, 2–0, to win the Stanley Cup in ice hockey, three games to one.
- Varney Air Lines, one of the predecessors to United Airlines, began operations as the first regularly scheduled air carrier in U.S. history As part of a contract between Varney Airlines and the U.S. Department of the Post Office, pilot Leon D. Cuddeback departed from Pasco, Washington with 64 pounds (29 kg) of mail, picked up more at Boise, and then proceeded to Elko, Nevada with a cargo of mail. Both towns had distribution centers at their railway stations. Earlier that day, Franklin Rose had departed from Elko toward Pasco, but was forced down by thunderstorms.
- The German airline Deutsche Luft Hansa (DLH), whose name and staff were used by and as part of the 1953 creation of the West German national airline Lufthansa, made its first scheduled passenger flight, departing from Berlin to Zurich in Switzerland, with stops along the way in Halle, Erfurt and Stuttgart. The fledgling airline used a Fokker F.II plane.
- The first recorded instance of a person being killed by a cassowary, a large, flightless bird indigenous to Australia and southern Pacific islands, occurred when 16-year old Phillip McClean bled to death near Mossman, Queensland after being attacked by a large Southern Cassowary while he and his brother were trying to kill it.
- Eusebio Joaquín González allegedly had a vision in which God changed Gonzales' first name to Aarón and told him to leave Monterrey in the Nuevo León state of Mexico, where Gonzalez created La Luz del Mundo, a nontrinitarian charismatic restorationist Christian church.
- Born:
  - Sergio Franchi, Italian opera tenor; in Codogno (d. 1990)
  - Gil Kane (pen name for Eli Katz), Latvian-born American comic book artist for both DC and Marvel; in Riga (d. 2000)
  - Ian Paisley, Northern Ireland politician and the UK's First Minister of Northern Ireland; in Armagh (d. 2014)
  - Randy Weston, American jazz pianist; in New York City (d. 2018)
  - Robert Simmonds, Canadian law enforcement administrator and Commissioner of the Royal Canadian Mounted Police from 1977 to 1987; in Keatley, Saskatchewan (d. 2023)
  - Alexander Butterfield, American presidential adviser known for his 1973 revelation of the tape recordings of White House conversations; in Pensacola, Florida (d. 2026)
- Died: Gerald Chapman, 38, American criminal who was nicknamed "The Gentleman Bandit", was hanged at the Wethersfield State Prison in Connecticut for the 1924 murder of policeman James Skelly.

== April 7, 1926 (Wednesday) ==
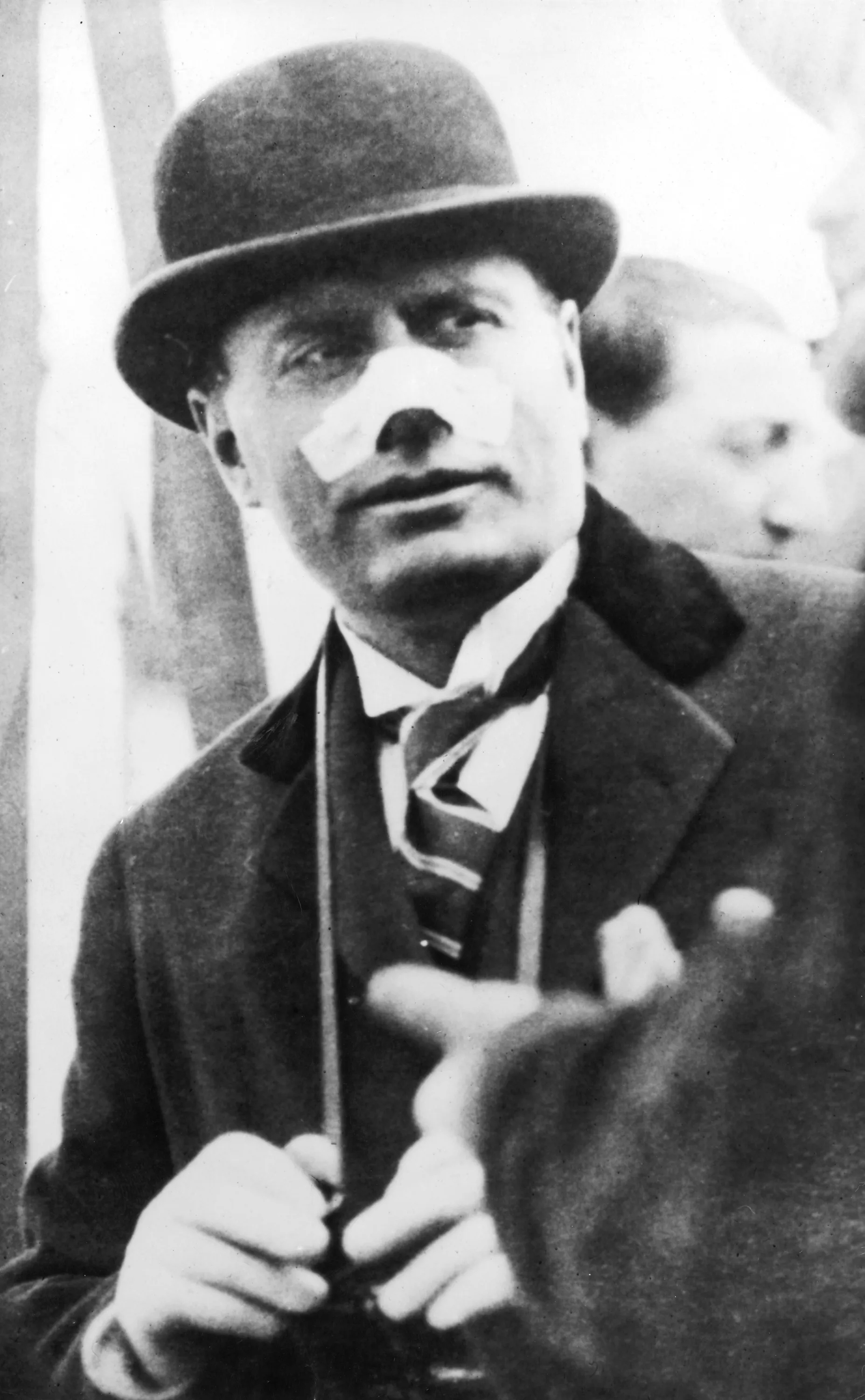
Mussolini with bandage after assassination attempt

- In Rome, Italian Premier Benito Mussolini was shot by Violet Gibson, sister of Lord Ashbourne, but the bullets only grazed his nose. Mussolini had stepped out to the street in Rome after an opening speech to the Seventh International Congress of Surgery, where he had praised surgeons who had treated him when he was wounded during World War One, and joked that Gibson had "chosen the wrong moment" to shoot him since he was in the presence of "several hundred of the greatest surgical scientists in the world."
- Across Italy, three staffers of anti-Fascist newspapers were murdered, others were beaten, and property was smashed in nighttime "reprisal" attacks following the attempt on Mussolini's life.
- Born:
  - Prem Nazir, Indian film actor, in Chirayinkeezhu, Travancore Kingdom, British India (now in Kerala state) (d. 1989)
  - Erik Bruun, Finnish graphic designer; in Viipuri (now Vyborg in Russia) (alive in 2026)
  - Miyoko Asō, Japanese voice actress, in Tokyo (d. 2018)
  - Julio Scherer García, Mexican journalist, editor of the Mexico City daily Excélsior, 1968 to 1976, and founder of the magazine Proceso; in Mexico City (d. 2015)
- Died: Giovanni Amendola, 43, Italian journalist and politician, died from injuries sustained in an attack by Fascists almost a year earlier on July 20, 1925.

== April 8, 1926 (Thursday) ==
- Ford Motor Company Aktiengesellschaft, the German subsidiary of the American Ford Motor Company, assembled its first vehicle, a Model T, using parts imported from the U.S. in order to circumvent the high tariff on the importation of fully-assembled vehicles.
- Nikola Uzunović took office as the Prime Minister of the Kingdom of Serbs, Croats and Slovenes (later Yugoslavia) following the resignation of Nikola Pašić.
- Finland composer Leevi Madetoja's Symphony No. 3 was performed for the first time, premiering in Helsinki by the Helsinki Philharmonic Orchestra.
- Following a colorful naval ceremony, Benito Mussolini disembarked in a battleship for Tripoli to make his first visit to the colony of Italian Libya, sporting a large bandage across his nose from the previous day's assassination attempt but displaying no other ill effects.
- Born: Shecky Greene (stage name for Fred Sheldon Greenfield), American comedian; in Chicago (d. 2023)

== April 9, 1926 (Friday) ==
- In the first championship of a major professional basketball league in the U.S., the Cleveland Rosenblums won the best 3-of-5 series of the American Basketball League, defeating the Brooklyn Arcadians, 23 to 22, in Game 3 after sweeping the first two games, 36-33 and 37–21.
- An attempt to start a military coup against Greek dictator Theodoros Pangalos was swiftly crushed in Thessaloniki.
- Born:
  - Hugh Hefner, U.S. adult magazine publisher known for Playboy; in Chicago (d. 2017)
  - Vsevolod Safonov, Soviet Russian stage and film actor known for Belarusan Station; in Moscow (d. 1992 from cancer)
  - Dee Anthony, U.S. talent manager and agent known for managing Tony Bennett and Peter Frampton; as Anthony D'Addario) in The Bronx, New York City (d. 2009)
- Died:
  - Henry Miller, (stage name for John Pegge) 67, English-born U.S. stage actor and producer
  - "Zip the Pinhead" (stage name for William Henry Johnson), 83, African-American circus sideshow performer

== April 10, 1926 (Saturday) ==
- Quill and Scroll, the largest international high school journalism honor society, was founded at a convention of high school newspaper staffers gathered at the University of Iowa in the United States, with delegates from 19 chapters from Iowa and eight other states; within its first 100 years, it would have chapters in almost 15,000 high schools in 38 nations .
- The Italian-built airship N-1, recently renamed Norge after being sold to the Norwegian Aviation Society, departed from Ciampino Airport near Rome, to begin its attempt to become the first aircraft to fly over the North Pole. Norge flew first England to the Airship Station at the Royal Naval Air Force Base at Pulham St Mary, landing later in the day.
- King Fuad of Egypt inaugurated the new Egyptian Parliament.
- The Mauna Loa volcano erupted in Hawaii.
- In Scottish soccer football, St Mirren F.C. of Paisley, Renfrewshire defeated Celtic of Glasgow, 2 to 0, to win the Scottish Cup. Celtic had finished in first place, and St Mirren fourth place, in the Scottish Football League.

== April 11, 1926 (Sunday) ==
- The fiery explosion of the U.S. oil tanker Gulf of Venezuela killed 27 sailors and injured 11 others as the ship sat in the harbor at Port Arthur, Texas.
- Benito Mussolini arrived in Tripoli (now the capital of Libya) to a large ceremony and reviewed 3,000 colonial troops, marking the first time an Italian leader had visited the nation's overseas colonies.
- With a record 17,000 spectators watching the championship of American soccer football, the National Challenge Cup, Bethlehem Steel F.C. of Bethlehem, Pennsylvania, defeated the Ben Millers of St. Louis, 7 to 2, at Ebbets Field, home of baseball's Brooklyn Dodgers.
- Died:

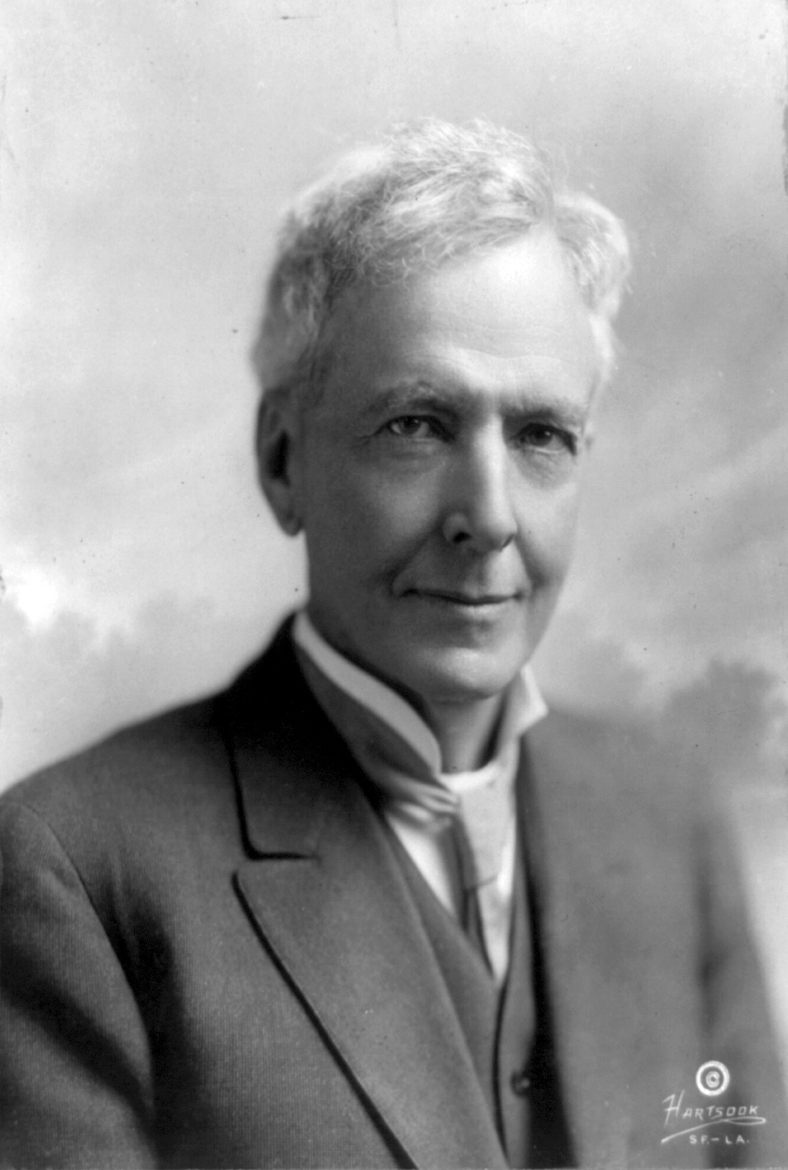
Dr. Burbank

  - Luther Burbank, 77, American horticulturalist known for developing more than 300 varieties and strains of fruits, vegetables, grains, grasses and flowers, most notably the russet Burbank potato that became the most predominant potato in the world for food processing and revived Ireland's potato production after the Great Famine of 1845
  - Molly Goodnight, 86, American cattlewoman and conservationist credited with saving the Southern plains bison from extinction
  - André-Joseph Allar, 80, French sculptor

== April 12, 1926 (Monday) ==
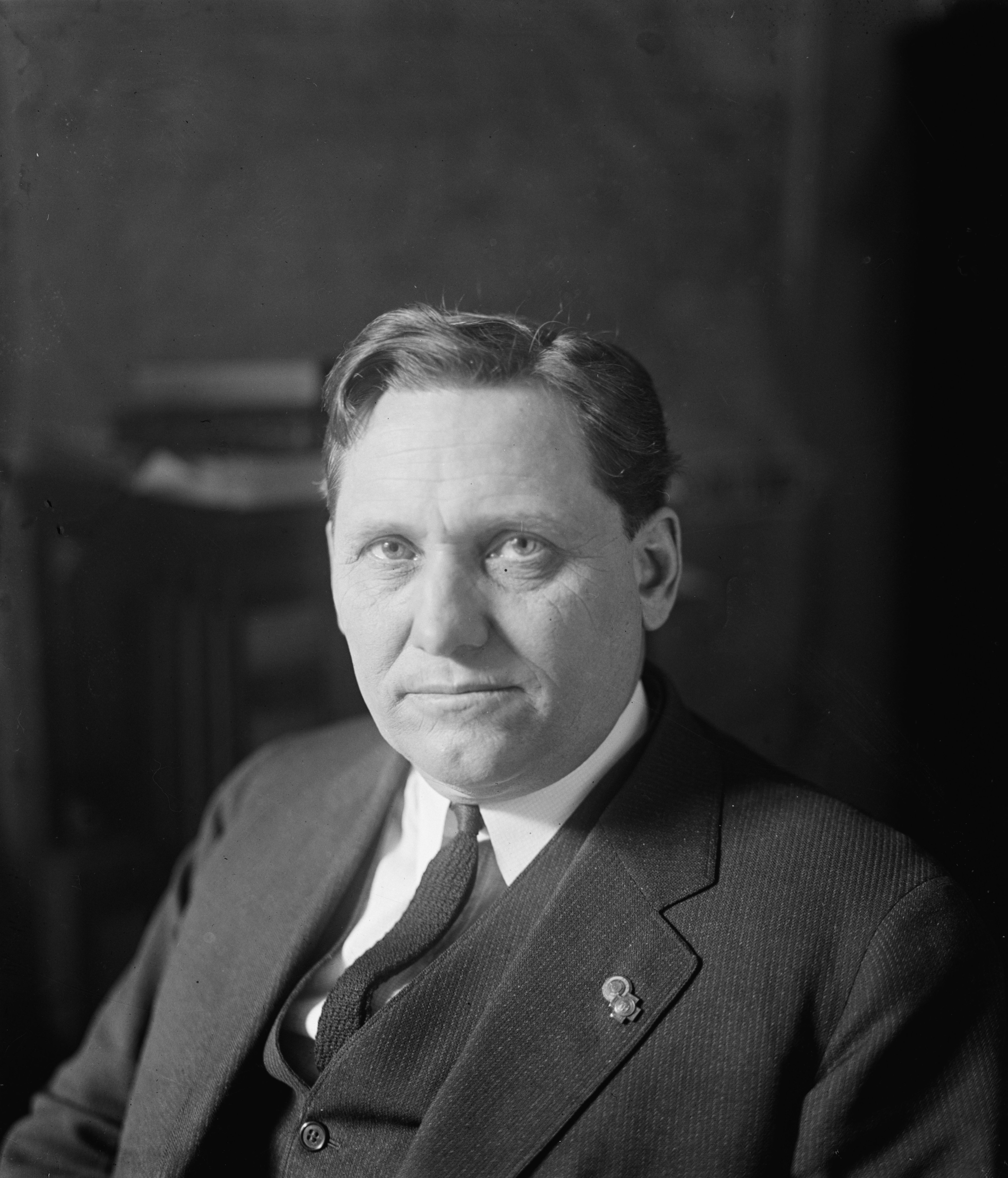
Senator Brookhart

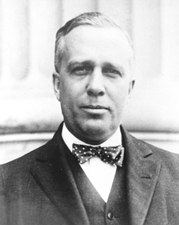
Senator Steck

- By a vote of 45–41, the United States Senate unseated Iowa Senator Smith W. Brookhart and seated Daniel F. Steck, after Brookhart had already served for over one year. In a close election for Senate in 1924, Brookhart had won by a margin of 755 votes, 447,706 to 446, 951 but Steck filed an election challenge with the U.S. Senate Committee on Elections and Privileges.
- Louis Borno was elected to another term as President of Haiti by the 21 members of the nation's legislative body, the government-appointed Conseil d'État (Council of State).
- Born:
  - Khozh-Akhmed Bersanov, Chechen ethnographer; in Chechen Autonomous Oblast, Russian SFSR, Soviet Union (d. 2018)
  - Jane Withers, American child actress on film and radio, known for playing the role of nemesis to Shirley Temple in multiple films, and as "Josephine the Plumber" in TV commercials of the 1950s and 1960s; in Atlanta (d. 2021)

== April 13, 1926 (Tuesday) ==
- In Norway, pilot Lincoln Ellsworth and Arctic Explorer Roald Amundsen departed from Oslo to Spitzbergen, where they would board the airship Norge to fly over the North Pole.
- In one of the greatest Opening Day pitcher's duels of all time in U.S. baseball, Walter Johnson of the Washington Senators defeated Eddie Rommel and the Philadelphia Athletics, 1–0 in fifteen innings.
- Born: Tomiko Miyao, Japanese novelist; in Kochi (d. 2014)

== April 14, 1926 (Wednesday) ==
- What would become Nationwide Insurance was founded by the Ohio Farm Bureau in Columbus, Ohio as the Farm Bureau Mutual Insurance Company.
- With the opening of the fourth of 34 authorized Contract Air Mail Route (CAM) routes in the U.S., "CAM-2", Robertson Aircraft Corporation started a Contract Air Mail service between St. Louis and Chicago, with pilot Charles A. Lindbergh guiding the first flight, which also made scheduled stops at Springfield and Peoria, Illinois.
- Born:
  - Frank Daniel (František Daniel), Czech-born American film director, producer and screenwriter; in Kolín, Czechoslovakia (d. 1996)
  - Gloria Jean (stage name for Gloria Jean Schoonover), American film actress; in Buffalo, New York (d. 2018)
  - George Robledo, Chilean footballer with 31 caps for Chile national team; in Iquique (d. 1989)
  - Leopoldo Calvo-Sotelo, Prime Minister of Spain from 1981 to 1982; in Madrid (d. 2008)
  - Liz Renay (stage name for Pearl Elizabeth Dobbins), American stripper, entertainer and tell-all book writer; in Chandler, Arizona (d. 2007)
- Died: Harry Bulger, 54, American Broadway musical singer and vaudeville comedian who was part of the duo of "Matthews and Bulger", died of pneumonia.

== April 15, 1926 (Thursday) ==
- The Soviet Union declared its annexation of the uninhabited Arctic Ocean islands designated as Fridtjof Nansen Land (now called Franz Josef Land), based on the sector principle used the previous year by Canada to claim all land and water north of its own territory as far as the North Pole.
- Residents of portions of Beijing that had been occupied by the Guominjun warlords fled in panic as the army of Zhang Zuolin reached Tongzhou, within striking distance of the city.
- Canadian Finance Minister James Robb presented the new budget of King's Liberal government, reporting a $55 million budget surplus and offering $25 million worth of tax cuts as well as reduced tariffs for automobiles.
- Frederick McDonald, who had recently lost re-election to the Australian House of Representatives and then challenged the result to ask for his opponent, Thomas Ley, to be removed from office, disappeared while on his way to a meeting with Jack Lang, the Premier of New South Wales. Although the mystery of McDonald's disappearance was never solved, two more opponents of Ley (Hyman Goldstein and Keith Greedor) died mysteriously from falls, and Ley would be convicted in 1947 of the murder of another man, John Mudie, and committed to England's Broadmoor Hospital for the Criminally Insane.
- Sesquicentennial Stadium, built for the exposition to celebrate the 150th anniversary of the United States Declaration of Independence and with 100,000 seats, opened in Philadelphia. Last used in 1989, the stadium would be demolished 66 years after its opening, in 1992.

== April 16, 1926 (Friday) ==
- Zhang Zuolin's army surrounded Beijing as the Guominjun retreated.
- In Chicago, a U.S. District Judge, James H. Wilkerson, ruled that the U.S. government had no legal authority to regulate radio broadcasting, including the power to place limits on the number of stations, or limit the wattage for broadcasting or the assignment of a specific radio frequency. For the next 10 months, until a new law could be passed to replace the Radio Act of 1912, there would be no limits on broadcasting until the creation of the Federal Radio Commission (now the Federal Communications Commission by the Radio Act of 1927.
- Born: Roger Bacon, American physicist known for his 1958 invention of carbon fibers; in Cleveland, Ohio (d. 2007)

== April 17, 1926 (Saturday) ==
- Zhang Zuolin's army entered Beijing.
- Western Air Express, which would become Western Airlines in 1934, began operations. As with many passenger airlines, the company began as a contractor to carry airmail for the U.S. Post Office, and continue as a passenger airline until its 1987 takeover by Delta Air Lines.
- While nearly 20,000 members of the Women's Guild of the Empire marched through the city to protest against strikes and lockouts as a means of settling labour disputes, 1,500 railway workers went on strike in London.
- Born:
  - Rangaswamy Narasimhan, Indian computer scientist and leader of the team that designed the TIFRAC computer, the first to be developed in the nation of India; in Madras, Presidency of Fort St George, British India (now Chennai in Tamil Nadu state) (d. 2007)
  - Gerry McNeil, Canadian ice hockey player and goaltender for the Montreal Canadiens; in Quebec City (d. 2004)

== April 18, 1926 (Sunday) ==
- The first radio station in Poland, Polskie Radio Program I of Warsaw, began regular broadcasting starting at 5:00 in the afternoon, opening with journalist Janina Sztompka-Grabowska telling listeners, "Halo, halo, Polskie Radio Warszawa, fala 480" ("Hello, hello, Polish Radio Warsaw, wave 480."), after which she announced the live broadcast of the inaugural ceremonies. The 480 meter wavelength reflected a frequency of 625 kHz.
- Elections for the 12-member National Council of the Principality of Monaco were conducted with ballots cast by a 30-member Electoral College, 21 of whom who had been selected in March by 559 voters. Of the 12 persons receiving the most votes, Auguste Settimo finished highest with 26.
- Lava from the Mauna Loa eruption engulfed the village of Hoʻōpūloa on the "Big Island" of Hawaii in the U.S. Hawaiian Territory.
- The ballets Chorale and Novelette, choreographed by Martha Graham, premiered at New York City's 48th Street Theater as part of her first independently produced concerts.
- French and Spanish representatives failed to reach an agreement in talks with Rif rebel delegates in Morocco on ending the ongoing rebellion led by Abd el-Krim.
- Died: Alexandrino Faria de Alencar, 77, Brazilian Minister of the Navy who modernized the naval service of the South American nation

== April 19, 1926 (Monday) ==
- The Republic of Turkey passed Cabotage Act No. 815, declaring that only Turkish ships would be permitted to serve along the coastlines of Anatolia and Thrace, to take effect on July 1.
- The Royal Society of Thailand was created by decree of Siam's King Prajadhipok to combine existing agencies in charge of national libraries, national museums, literature works, engineering works, historical sites, and historical objects into a single administrative body based on the King's statement of purpose that "Siam should have a learned society as in Western countries".
- Pitcairn Aviation, which would later merge with newer companies to create Eastern Air Lines, was formally established.
- Huddersfield Town won the English Football League title when it finished first for the third consecutive time, closing with a record of 23 wins and 11 draws (23–11–8), ahead of second place Arsenal (22–8–12).
- Canadian distance runner Johnny Miles, who had never previously competed in a race of more than 10 miles, won the 1926 Boston Marathon, his first of two first-place finishes at Boston. His time of 2 hours, 25 minutes and 40 seconds was so much faster than other marathons that the race course was remeasured and found to be 176 yards (161 m) short.
- Born:
  - Rawya Ateya, Egyptian politician and first female parliamentarian in the Arab world; in Giza Governorate (d. 1997)
  - Geoffrey Rose, British epidemiologist; in London (d. 1993)
  - Benjamin "Lefty" Ruggiero, American mobster and racketeer with the Bonanno crime family; in New York City (died from cancer, 1994)
- Died: Sir Squire Bancroft, 84, English stage actor

== April 20, 1926 (Tuesday) ==
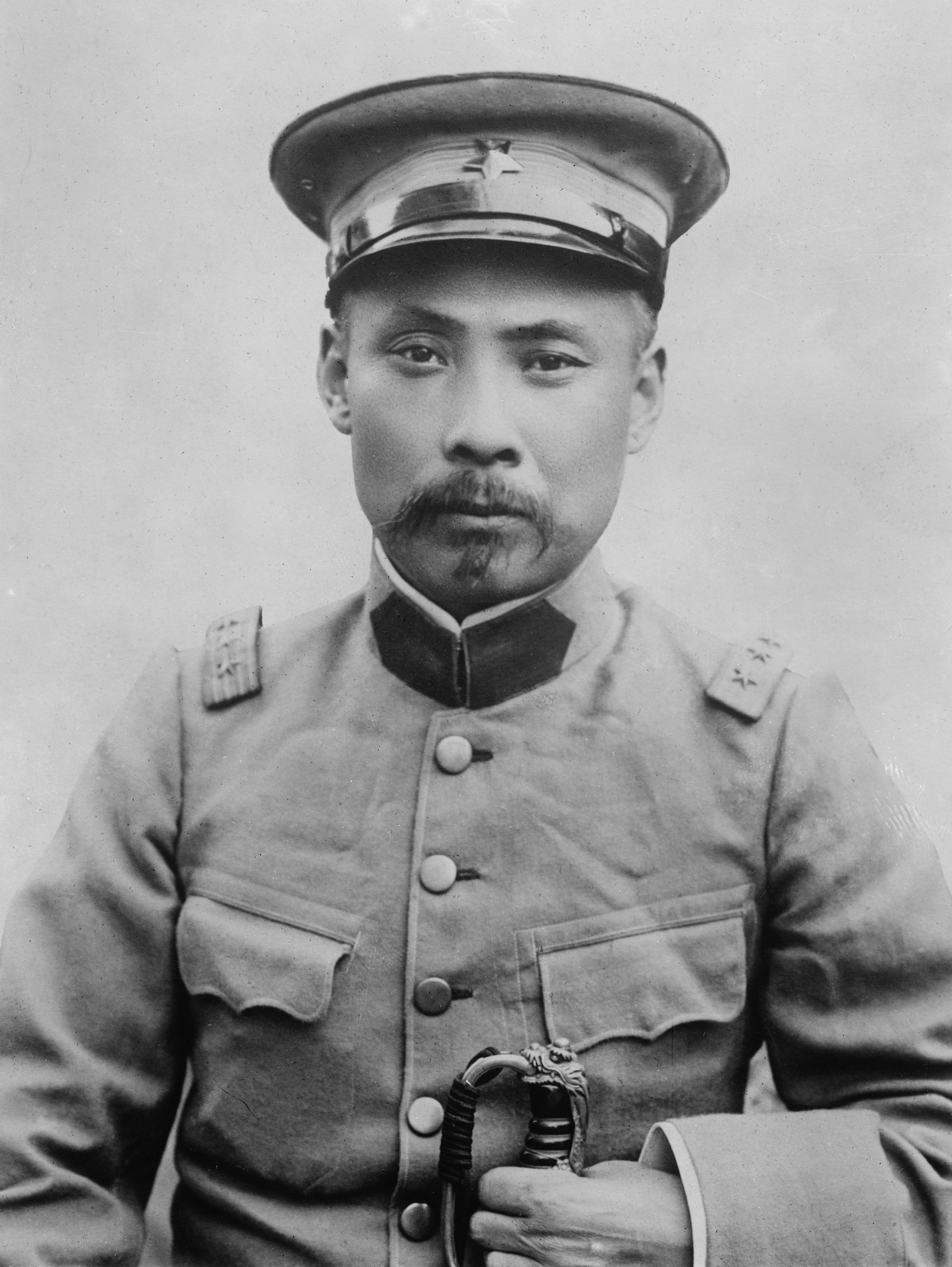
General Duan driven out

- Duan Qirui, the acting President of the Republic of China, fled from Beijing to Tianjin, and Hu Weide assumed the post.
- The Mellon–Berenger Agreement was negotiated. The pact agreed on the amount and rate of repayment of France's debt to the United States arising from loans and payments in kind made during World War I. The agreement pended ratification in French Parliament.
- The French franc hit a new historical low of 30 to the U.S. dollar.
- The Greek soccer football club PAOK FC (Panthessaloníkios Athlitikós Ómilos Konstadinoupolitón or "Pan-Thessalonian Athletic Club of Constantinopolitans") was founded in Thessaloniki by Ottoman Greeks who had been forced to flee the Turkish Republic at the end of the Greco-Turkish War in 1923.
- Died: Billy Quirk, 53, American stage and silent film comedian, died after an undisclosed illness of two years.

== April 21, 1926 (Wednesday) ==
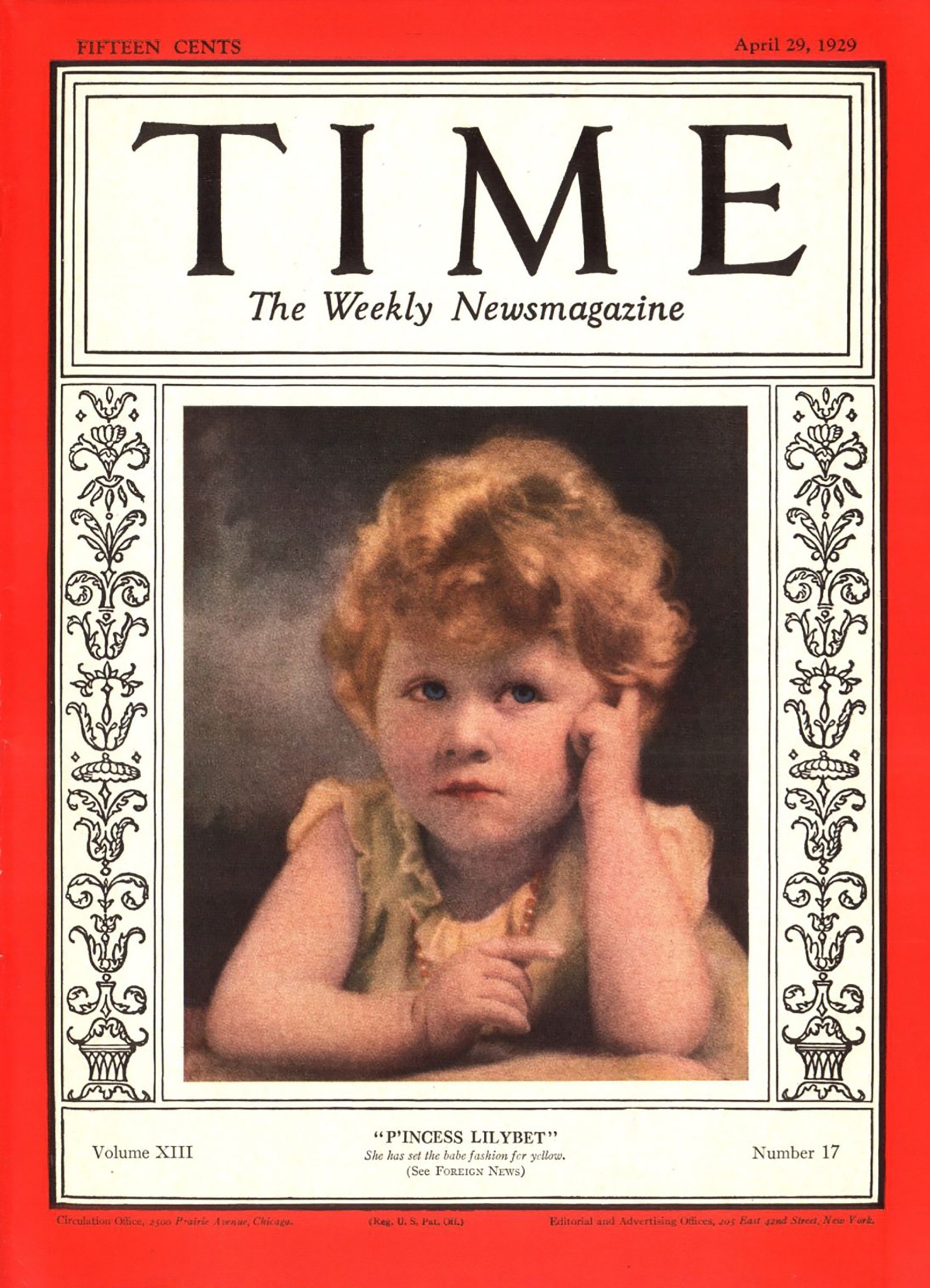
Princess Elizabeth

- Elizabeth II, who would serve from 1952 to 2022 as Queen of the United Kingdom of Great Britain and Northern Ireland, as well as Australia, Canada and other independent British Commonwealth nations that retained allegiance to the Crown, was born to the Duchess of York and the Duke of York. The event took place at the home of Claude Bowes-Lyon, 14th Earl of Strathmore and Kinghorne father of Elizabeth's mother, the Duchess of York, at No. 17 Bruton Street in Mayfair, London at 2:40 in the morning. (d. 2022)
- (8 Shawwal 1344 AH) The "Day of Sorrow", the razing of the Al-Baqi Cemetery in Medina in the Kingdom of Hejaz (now in Saudi Arabia) was carried out by King Abdulaziz ibn Saud, the Sultan of Nejd who had conquered Hejaz four months earlier. In addition to Medina's heritage as the city where Muhammad founded Islam upon fleeing Mecca, the Al-Baqi cemetery was a holy site for Shia Muslims, in that it housed the bodies of four of Muhammad's relatives in the Ahl al-Bayt.
- On the traditional anniversary day of the founding of Rome, the Kingdom of Italy proclaimed the first annual "Colonial Day", celebrating the Italian colonies.
- Born:
  - Arthur Rowley, English footballer who set the existing record in the English League for most goals scored in a career, with 434 in 619 League games, inductee to the English Football Hall of Fame; in Wolverhampton, Staffordshire (d. 2002)
  - William C. Wampler, U.S. Representative for Virginia who was elected at age 27 as the youngest member of the 83rd United States Congress, serving from 1953 to 1955, and 1967 to 1983; in Pennington Gap, Virginia (d. 2012)
- Died: George Washington Murray, 72, African-American Congressman who represented South Carolina in the U.S. House of Representatives from 1893 to 1895, and 1896 to 1897

== April 22, 1926 (Thursday) ==
- The United Kingdom and Brazil signed a treaty establishing the boundary between British Guiana (now Guyana) and northern Brazil as the Essequibo River and the Courantyne River.
- Iran and Turkey signed a "Treaty of Friendship" in Tehran. It pledged nonaggression towards one another and also included possible joint actions that could have been taken to deal with groups within their borders that threatened security, particularly Kurds.
- Born:
  - Charlotte Rae (stage name for Charlotte Rae Lubotsky), American TV actress best known for The Facts of Life and Diff'rent Strokes; in Milwaukee (d. 2018)
  - Władysław J. Świątecki, French-born Polish theoretical physicist; in Paris (d. 2009)
  - James Stirling, Scottish architect; in Glasgow (d. 1992)
  - Gilman Kraft, U.S. publisher of the Broadway theatre publication Playbill; in Union City, New Jersey (d. 1999)

== April 23, 1926 (Friday) ==
- Germany reported a trade surplus for March of 240 million marks, in an encouraging sign for the country's financial stabilization and ability to make Dawes Plan payments.
- Died: Madhavrao Sapre, 34, Indian Hindi language short story writer known for writing Ek tokri Bhar Mitti

== April 24, 1926 (Saturday) ==
- Germany and the Soviet Union signed the Treaty of Berlin, in which each pledged neutrality in an event of attack on the other by a third party within the next five years.
- In England, the Bolton Wanderers won the FA Cup Final by defeating Manchester City 1–0, before a crowd of 91,447 people at Wembley Stadium.
- The Convention on the Traffic of Motor Vehicles was signed by representatives of 22 nations (including France, Germany, Italy and Switzerland) at Paris in order to formally create a unified code of traffic laws in the signatory nations, and created the International Driving Permit.
- Born: Thorbjörn Fälldin, Prime Minister of Sweden from 1976 to 1978, and 1979 to 1982; in Högsjö (d. 2016)
- Died: Sunjong, 52, the last Emperor of Korea from 1907 to 1910 before Korea's annexation to the Japanese Empire, and later permitted the title of King Yi of Changdeokgung Palace for the remainder of his life. Sunjong's younger brother, Yi Un, inherited the title of the Changdeokgung King until the surrender of the Japanese Empire in 1945, and would serve as the leader of the House of Yi until dying in 1970.

== April 25, 1926 (Sunday) ==
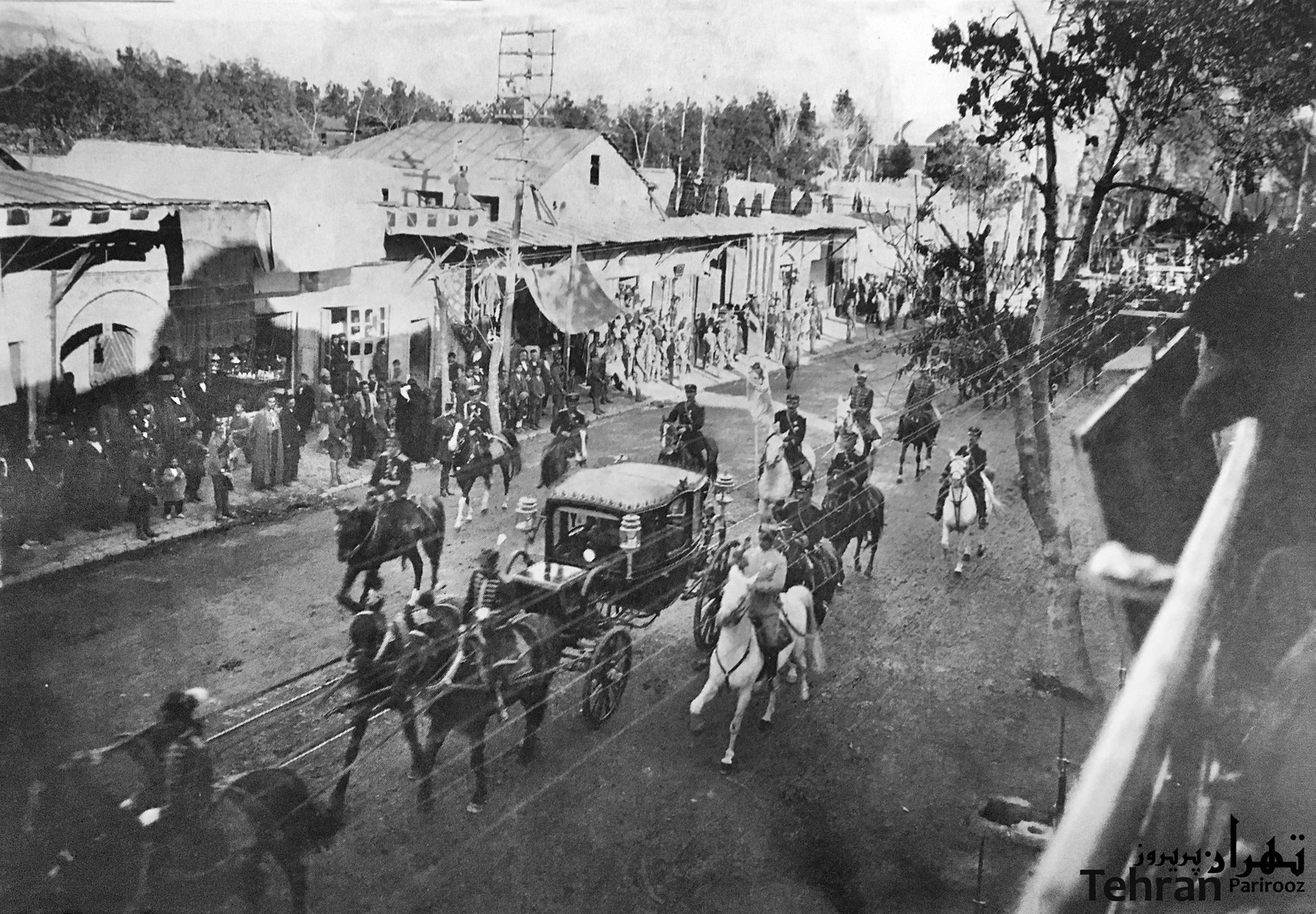
Reza Shah's coronation procession

- Less than five months after overthrowing King Ahmad Shah Qajar, Reza Khan was formally crowned as the Shah of Iran, beginning the Pahlavi dynasty. Before the elaborate coronation ceremony, Reza Shah designated his six-year-old son, Mohammad Reza Pahlavi, as the Crown Prince of the Middle Eastern nation.
- Giacomo Puccini's opera Turandot was performed for the first time, almost 17 months after his death and shortly after the music's completion by Franco Alfano.

== April 26, 1926 (Monday) ==
- Winston Churchill, the British Chancellor of the Exchequer, presented the new budget of Prime Minister Stanley Baldwin's Conservative government in the United Kingdom. It projected a deficit of £8 million, down from £14 million the previous year. The most controversial element was a proposed 5% betting tax to be added to each stake made at a race course or through a bookmaker.
- The Andhra University, one of the largest educational institutions in India, was authorized in British India as India's Governor-General gave royal assent on behalf of King George V to the Andhra University Act.
- Born:
  - David Coleman, English sports commentator; in Alderley Edge, Cheshire (d. 2013)
  - David Gottesman, American investor, businessman and philanthropist noted for founding the First Manhattan financial services company; in New York City (d. 2022)
  - Michael Mathias Prechtl, German artist; in Amberg (d. 2003)

== April 27, 1926 (Tuesday) ==
- At least 150 people died when the Japanese fishing vessel Chichibu Maru, reportedly carrying 26 crew and 233 fishermen ran aground and broke up off of the island of Horomushiro in Japan's Kuril Islands (now Paramushir as part of Russia) off of the coast of Sakhalin. Final reports were that a Japanese cruiser had rescued 99 of the 249 people aboard while 150 died.
- Al Capone and Jack McGurn killed an Illinois prosecutor, William H. McSwiggin, during a shooting against a rival gang in which they killed two members of the O'Donnell Gang, James J. Doherty and Red Duffy. Capone and McGurn were apparently unaware that McSwiggin was in the car of the rival gang.
- Seventeen-year-old Mel Ott, later inducted to the Baseball Hall of Fame, made his major league debut for the New York Giants, striking out in a pinch-hitting appearance.
- Born: Tim LaHaye, American Baptist minister and novelist known for the Left Behind series of bestselling books about events after "The Rapture"; in Detroit (d. 2016)

== April 28, 1926 (Wednesday) ==
- The Klein–Gordon equation for quantum mechanics was first proposed in a paper received from theoretical physicist Oskar Klein and published by Germany's Zeitschrift für Physik The equation was independently formulated by two other physicists in 1926, with a longer paper received before publication by the Zeitschrift für Physik by Walter Gordon (on July 30) and by Vladimir Fock (whose name is sometimes added to the title of the equation) on September 29.
- The first of ten murders in Tampa, Florida was carried out when Emma Hillard was decapitated in front of witnesses. Four more murders would occur two months later on the same street, Nebraska Avenue, and five with a similar pattern on May 27, 1927, in a different part of town before the arrest, conviction and execution of Benjamin F. Levins.
- U.S. President Calvin Coolidge proclaimed the General Grant Tree, a sequoia tree in California's Kings Canyon National Park, to be "the nation's Christmas tree".
- The pre-medical study honor society Alpha Epsilon Delta was founded in the U.S. at the University of Alabama in Tuscaloosa and would grow to chapters at 270 universities within its first 100 years.
- Born: Harper Lee, American author known for her novel To Kill a Mockingbird; in Monroeville, Alabama (d. 2016)
- Died:
  - Viscount Kageaki Kawamura, 76, Field Marshal in the Imperial Japanese Navy and hero of the 1904 Battle of the Yalu River during the Russo-Japanese War
  - Jeffreys Lewis (Mary Jeffreys Lewis), 73, British and U.S. stage actress

== April 29, 1926 (Thursday) ==
- Riffian rebel envoys in Morocco rejected the latest Franco-Spanish peace proposal to end the Rif War, refusing the condition that Abd el-Krim go into exile.
- Born: Paul Baran, Polish-born computer pioneer known for being one of the two co-inventors of packet switching for computer networks; in Grodno (now in Belarus (d. 2011)

== April 30, 1926 (Friday) ==
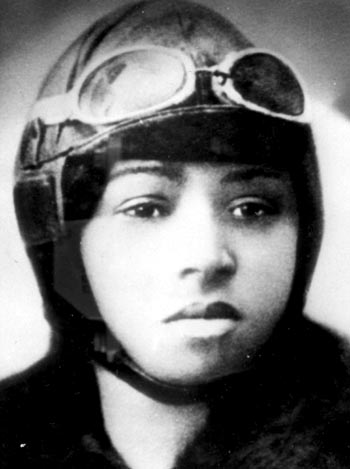
Bessie Coleman

- African-American pilot Bessie Coleman was killed while preparing for an airshow in Jacksonville, Florida, along with a passenger, William D. Willis, when her Curtiss JN-4 biplane went into a nose dive from an altitude of 1,000 feet (300 m). Coleman fell out of the airplane and plunged 600 feet (180 m) and the aircraft crashed into a tree moments later, killing Willis. Inspectors "found a wrench jammed in the controls... in such a way as to lock the mechanism.
- Final efforts to stave off a lockout of British coal miners failed when the miners rejected the owners' final offer of an average wage cut of 13 percent and a "temporary" workday increase from seven to eight hours. A state of emergency was then declared by the British government under the Emergency Powers Act 1920
- Born:
  - Cloris Leachman, American actress; in Des Moines, Iowa (d. 2021)
  - Edmund Cooper, English writer, in Marple, Greater Manchester known (under the pen name "Richard Avery") for The Expendables series of (d. 1982)
  - William Overgard, American comic strip writer known for Steve Roper and Mike Nomad; in Santa Monica, California (d. 1990)
- Died: Bessie Coleman, 34, American pilot
