= List of elections in 1926 =

The following elections occurred in the year 1926.

== Africa ==
- 1926 Egyptian parliamentary election
- 1926 Lagos by-election
- 1926 Northern Rhodesian general election
- 1926 South West African legislative election

== Asia ==
- 1926 Egyptian parliamentary election
- 1926 Hong Kong sanitary board election
- 1926 Madras Presidency legislative council election
- 1926 Persian legislative election

== Europe ==
- 1926 Danish Folketing election
- 1926 Estonian parliamentary election
- 1926 Greek parliamentary election
- 1926 Greek presidential election
- 1926 Hungarian parliamentary election
- 1926 Icelandic parliamentary election
- January 1926 Liechtenstein general election
- April 1926 Liechtenstein general election
- 1926 Lithuanian parliamentary election
- 1926 Monegasque general election
- 1926 Polish presidential elections
- 1926 Romanian general election
- 1926 San Marino general election

=== United Kingdom ===
- 1926 Bothwell by-election
- 1926 Chelmsford by-election
- 1926 Combined English Universities by-election
- 1926 Darlington by-election
- 1926 East Renfrewshire by-election
- 1926 Hammersmith North by-election
- 1926 Howdenshire by-election
- 1926 Wallsend by-election

== North America ==
=== Canada ===
- 1926 Canadian federal election
- 1926 Alberta general election
- 1926 Edmonton municipal election
- 1926 Ontario general election
- 1926 Toronto municipal election

=== Central America ===
- 1926 Guatemalan general election
- 1926 Honduran legislative election
- 1926 Nicaraguan presidential election
- 1926 Nicaraguan parliamentary election

=== United States ===
- 1926 New York state election
- 1926 United States elections

==== United States lieutenant gubernatorial ====
- 1926 California lieutenant gubernatorial election
- 1926 Connecticut lieutenant gubernatorial election
- 1926 Minnesota lieutenant gubernatorial election
- 1926 Nebraska lieutenant gubernatorial election
- 1926 Texas lieutenant gubernatorial election
- 1926 Wisconsin lieutenant gubernatorial election

==== United States gubernatorial ====
- 1926 Alabama gubernatorial election
- 1926 Arizona gubernatorial election
- 1926 Arkansas gubernatorial election
- 1926 California gubernatorial election
- 1926 Colorado gubernatorial election
- 1926 Connecticut gubernatorial election
- 1926 Georgia gubernatorial election
- 1926 Idaho gubernatorial election
- 1926 Iowa gubernatorial election
- 1926 Kansas gubernatorial election
- 1926 Maine gubernatorial election
- 1926 Maryland gubernatorial election
- 1926 Massachusetts gubernatorial election
- 1926 Michigan gubernatorial election
- 1926 Minnesota gubernatorial election
- 1926 Nebraska gubernatorial election
- 1926 Nevada gubernatorial election
- 1926 New Hampshire gubernatorial election
- 1926 New Mexico gubernatorial election
- 1926 New York gubernatorial election
- 1926 North Dakota gubernatorial election
- 1926 Ohio gubernatorial election
- 1926 Oklahoma gubernatorial election
- 1926 Oregon gubernatorial election
- 1926 Pennsylvania gubernatorial election
- 1926 Rhode Island gubernatorial election
- 1926 South Carolina gubernatorial election
- 1926 South Dakota gubernatorial election
- 1926 Tennessee gubernatorial election
- 1926 Texas gubernatorial election
- 1926 United States gubernatorial elections
- 1926 Vermont gubernatorial election
- 1926 Wisconsin gubernatorial election
- 1926 Wyoming gubernatorial election

==== United States House of Representatives ====
- 1926 United States House of Representatives elections
- 1926 United States House of Representatives elections in California
- 1926 United States House of Representatives elections in South Carolina

==== United States Senate ====
- 1926 United States Senate elections
- 1926 United States Senate election in Arizona
- 1926 United States Senate election in California
- 1926 United States Senate election in Colorado
- 1926 United States Senate election in Connecticut
- 1926 United States Senate election in Idaho
- 1926 United States Senate election in Illinois
- 1926 United States Senate election in Indiana
- 1926 United States Senate special election in Indiana
- 1926 United States Senate election in Iowa
- 1926 United States Senate special election in Iowa
- 1926 United States Senate election in Kansas
- 1926 United States Senate election in Kentucky
- 1926 United States Senate election in Louisiana
- 1926 United States Senate election in Maryland
- 1926 United States Senate special election in Massachusetts
- 1926 United States Senate election in Missouri
- 1926 United States Senate special election in Missouri
- 1926 United States Senate election in New Hampshire
- 1926 United States Senate election in New York
- 1926 United States Senate election in North Carolina
- 1926 United States Senate election in North Dakota
- 1926 United States Senate special election in North Dakota
- 1926 United States Senate election in Ohio
- 1926 United States Senate election in Oklahoma
- 1926 United States Senate election in Pennsylvania
- 1926 United States Senate election in South Carolina
- 1926 United States Senate election in South Dakota
- 1926 United States Senate election in Vermont
- 1926 United States Senate election in Washington
- 1926 United States Senate election in Wisconsin

== Oceania ==
=== Australia ===
- 1926 Eden-Monaro by-election
- 1926 Queensland state election
- 1926 Australian referendum

=== New Zealand ===
- 1926 Eden by-election

== South America ==
- 1926 Argentine legislative election
- 1926 Brazilian presidential election
- 1926 Colombian presidential election
- 1926 Uruguayan general election

== See also ==
- Category:1926 elections
