= Novelette =

Novelette or Novellette may refer to:

- Novelette (ballet), a 1926 ballet by Martha Graham
- Novelette (literature), a work of narrative prose fiction that is longer than a short story, but shorter than a novella and a novel
- Novelette (music), a short piece of lyrical music
- Novellette (Sibelius), a 1922 composition by Jean Sibelius
- Novelette, the central character of Trey Anthony's 2001 play Da Kink in My Hair
