= 1926 Argentine legislative election =

- 7 March 1926
- 83 of the 158 seats in the Chamber of Deputies
- Turnout: 49.17%
Party	Vote %	Seats	+/–
Radical Civic Union	39.46	38	−10
Conservative Parties	19.01	21	+3
Antipersonalist Radical Civic Union	11.50	7	+7
Socialist Party	11.48	4	0
Unified Radical Civic Union	8.74	8	+8
Lencinist Radical Civic Union	2.15	1	−2
Blockist Radical Civic Union	1.56	2	0
This lists parties that won seats. See the complete results below.
Results by province

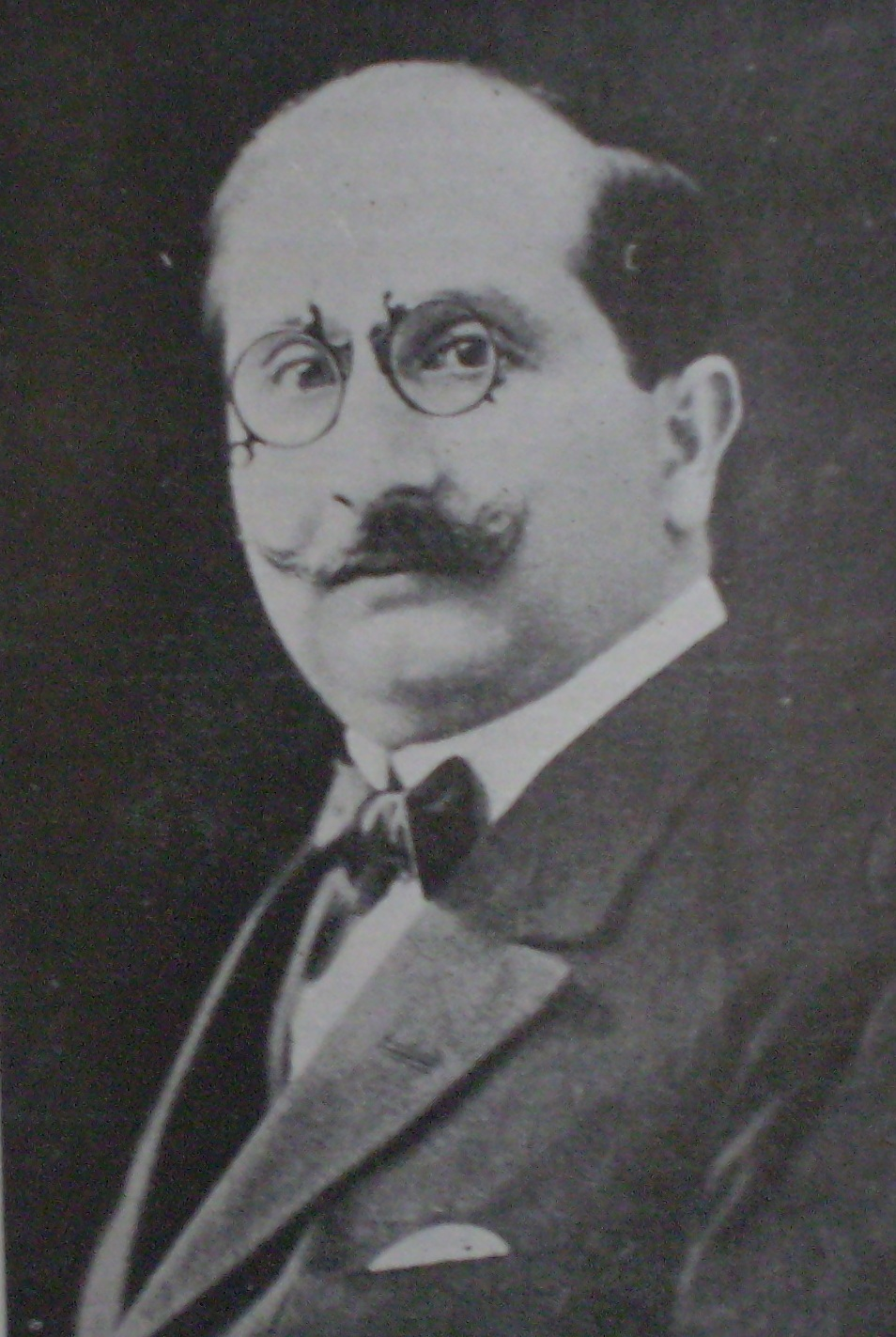
The hard-line Vicente Gallo's attempt to have a key Yrigoyen ally removed as governor backfired, and handed the popular former president a useful issue for his 1928 comeback

Legislative elections were held in Argentina on 7 March 1926. Voters chose their legislators and numerous governors with a turnout of 49%.

== Background ==
Elections in 1926 became a prologue to the presidential campaign which was to be held in April 1928. This was made inevitable by former President Hipólito Yrigoyen's decision to run for the office he had held from 1916 to 1922, when policy differences with the conservative wing of the UCR, as well as his removal of 18 governors by decree, created the Antipersonalist faction.

Yrigoyen's own popularity, the cohesiveness of his majority faction, and disunity among the "dissident" UCR groups (which were originally five, and had become ten by 1926) sustained the aging populist as the country's paramount politician after disappointing mid-term results in 1924.

The 1926 results themselves further eroded the pro-Yrigoyen UCR's majority in the Lower House, while solidifying dissident UCR control in Entre Ríos, Mendoza, San Juan, Santa Fe, and Santiago del Estero Provinces. Yrigoyen's allies, who won in three, smaller northwestern provinces, carried Buenos Aires Province, as well the City of Buenos Aires, however. These latter were defining victories in Yrigoyen's preparations for 1928, and more so because a key ally, Buenos Aires Governor José Luis Cantilo, would be succeeded by Valentín Vergara — an even closer ally.

Given that Conservatives, Democratic Progressives, and Socialists were unable to gain traction as alternatives to the dueling UCRs, these results compelled the Antipersonalists' chief voice, Interior Minister Gallo, to petition the President for Vergara's removal. Alvear, however, refused, and Gallo, who acrimoniously resigned, handed Yrigoyen a powerful issue as the nation geared for the 1928 campaign.

== Results ==
Party or alliance		Votes	%	Seats	
Party or alliance		Votes	%	Won	Total
Radical Civic Union		336,351	39.46	38	60
Conservative Parties	Democratic Party of Córdoba	45,144	5.30	4	10
Conservative Parties	Conservative Party	38,584	4.53	7	15
Conservative Parties	Autonomist–Liberal Pact	26,618	3.12	3	5
Conservative Parties	Popular Concentration	16,645	1.95	0	1
Conservative Parties	Liberal Party of Tucumán	15,810	1.86	3	5
Conservative Parties	Provincial Union	9,288	1.09	2	2
Conservative Parties	Liberal Party of Mendoza	7,390	0.87	1	2
Conservative Parties	Civic Concentration	2,563	0.30	1	1
Conservative Parties	Liberal Democratic Party			–	2
Conservative Parties	Total	162,042	19.01	21	43
Antipersonalist Radical Civic Union		98,049	11.50	7	10
Socialist Party		97,880	11.48	4	19
Unified Radical Civic Union		74,463	8.74	8	17
Dissident Radicalism	Doctor Carranza Radical Civic Union	8,194	0.96	0	0
Dissident Radicalism	White Radical Civic Union	8,077	0.95	0	0
Dissident Radicalism	Independent Radical Civic Union	5,736	0.67	0	0
Dissident Radicalism	Principist Radical Civic Union	3,797	0.45	0	0
Dissident Radicalism	Red Radical Civic Union	2,514	0.29	0	0
Dissident Radicalism	Alem Radical Civic Union	33	0.00	0	0
Dissident Radicalism	Total	28,351	3.33	0	0
Lencinist Radical Civic Union		18,327	2.15	1	2
Blockist Radical Civic Union		13,333	1.56	2	2
Communist Party of Argentina		7,088	0.83	0	0
Unitarian Party		1,466	0.17	0	0
Public Health Party		934	0.11	0	0
Democratic Progressive Party		792	0.09	0	3
National Feminist Party		684	0.08	0	0
Others		754	0.09	0	0
Independents		11,771	1.38	0	0
Vacant				2	2
Total		852,285	100.00	83	158
Valid votes		852,285	96.38		
Invalid votes		0	0.00		
Blank votes		32,052	3.62		
Total votes		884,337	100.00		
Registered voters/turnout		1,799,131	49.15		
Source: Cantón, Chamber of Deputies
