= Valentín Vergara =

Argentinian politician (1879–1930)

Doctor Valentín Vergara
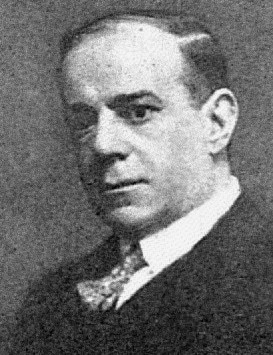

Governor of Buenos Aires Province
- In office 1926–1930
- Preceded by: José Luis Cantilo
- Succeeded by: Nereo Crovetto
- Succeeded by: Thomas Vergara

National Deputy of the Argentine Republic
- In office 1918–1926

Personal details
- Born: February 14, 1879 Diamante, Entre Ríos, Argentina
- Died: September 22, 1930 (aged 51) Diamante, Entre Ríos, Argentina
- Resting place: La Recoleta Cemetery
- Party: Radical Civic Union
- Relatives: Thomas Vergara (great-grandson)

Valentín Vergara (1879-1930) was an Argentine lawyer and politician, who served as national deputy and governor of the Province of Buenos Aires.
