= 1926 Wisconsin lieutenant gubernatorial election =

- November 2, 1926
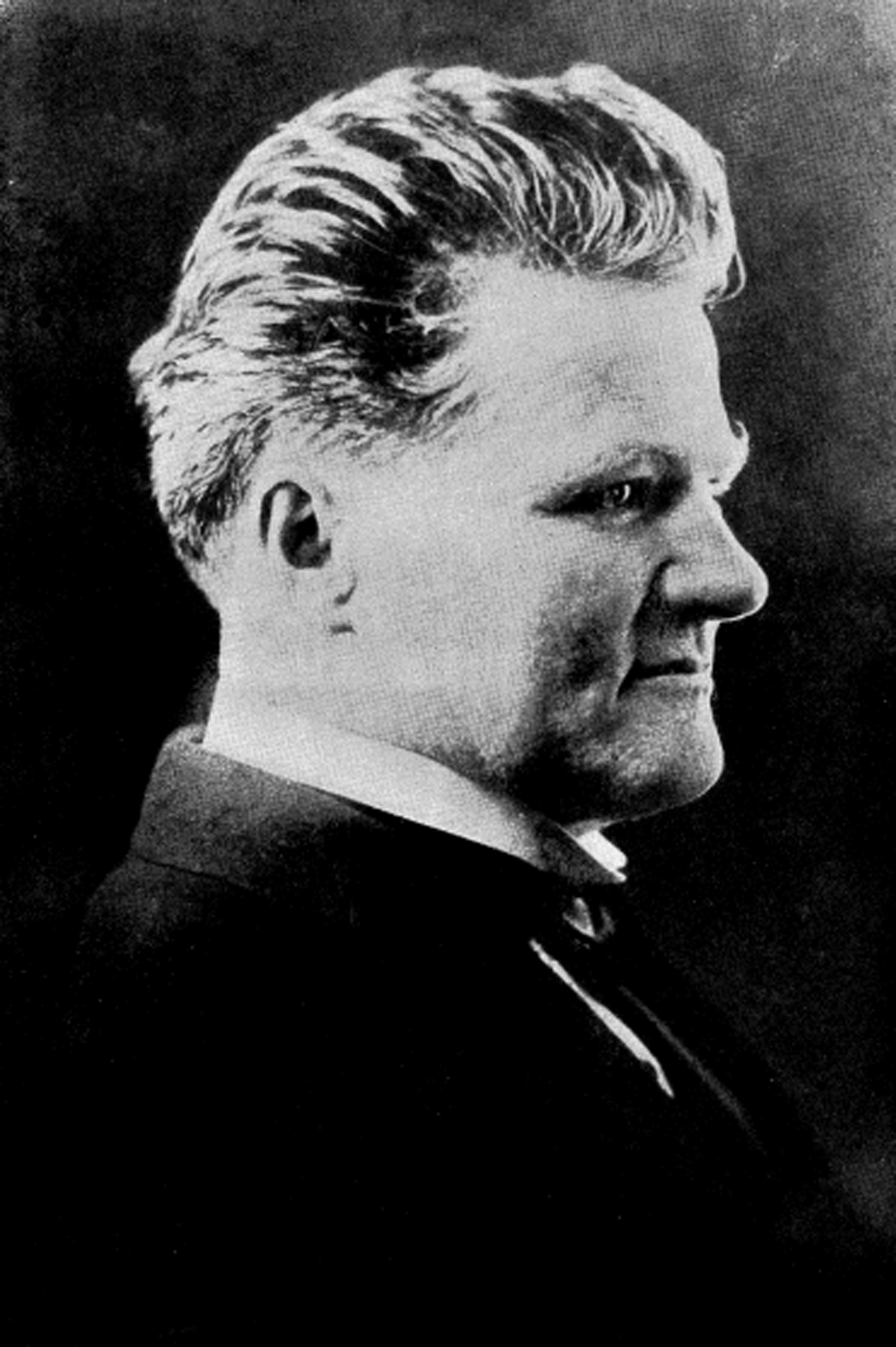

Nominee	Henry Huber	William G. Evenson	Peter Gilles
Party	Republican	Democratic	Social-Democratic
Popular vote	395,235	61,865	34,283
Percentage	78.90%	12.35%	6.84%
Lieutenant Governor before election
Henry Huber
Republican
Elected Lieutenant Governor
Henry Huber
Republican

The 1926 Wisconsin lieutenant gubernatorial election was held on November 2, 1926, in order to elect the lieutenant governor of Wisconsin. Incumbent Republican lieutenant governor Henry Huber defeated Democratic nominee William G. Evenson, Social-Democratic nominee Peter Gilles and Prohibition nominee Henry H. Tubbs.

== Republican primary ==
The Republican primary election was held on September 7, 1926. Incumbent lieutenant governor Henry Huber received a plurality of the votes (49.73%) against candidates J. N. Tittemore and Conrad Hansen, and was thus elected as the nominee for the general election.

=== Results ===
1926 Republican lieutenant gubernatorial primary
Party	Candidate	Votes	%
Republican	Henry Huber (incumbent)	200,514	49.73%
Republican	J. N. Tittemore	106,807	26.49%
Republican	Conrad Hansen	95,885	23.78%
Total votes		403,206	100.00%

== General election ==
On election day, November 2, 1926, incumbent Republican lieutenant governor Henry Huber won re-election by a margin of 333,370 votes against his foremost opponent Democratic nominee William G. Evenson, thereby retaining Republican control over the office of lieutenant governor. Huber was sworn in for his second term on January 3, 1927.

=== Results ===
Wisconsin lieutenant gubernatorial election, 1926
Party	Candidate	Votes	%
Republican	Henry Huber (incumbent)	395,235	78.90
Democratic	William G. Evenson	61,865	12.35
Social-Democratic	Peter Gilles	34,283	6.84
Prohibition	Henry H. Tubbs	9,448	1.89
	Scattering	82	0.02
Total votes		500,913	100.00
Republican hold			
