= 1926 Nicaraguan parliamentary election =

Parliamentary elections were held in Nicaragua in November 1926 to elect half of the seats in the Chamber of Deputies and one-third of the seats in the Senate of the National Congress.

"The congressional elections which were postponed awaiting the outcome of the Corinto Conference were held late in November [1926] except in the Departments of León, Chinandega, and Esteli, where the unsettled conditions made elections impossible."
