= Högsjö parish =

Coordinates: 62.7919°N 17.8964°E

Högsjö parish Högsjö socken
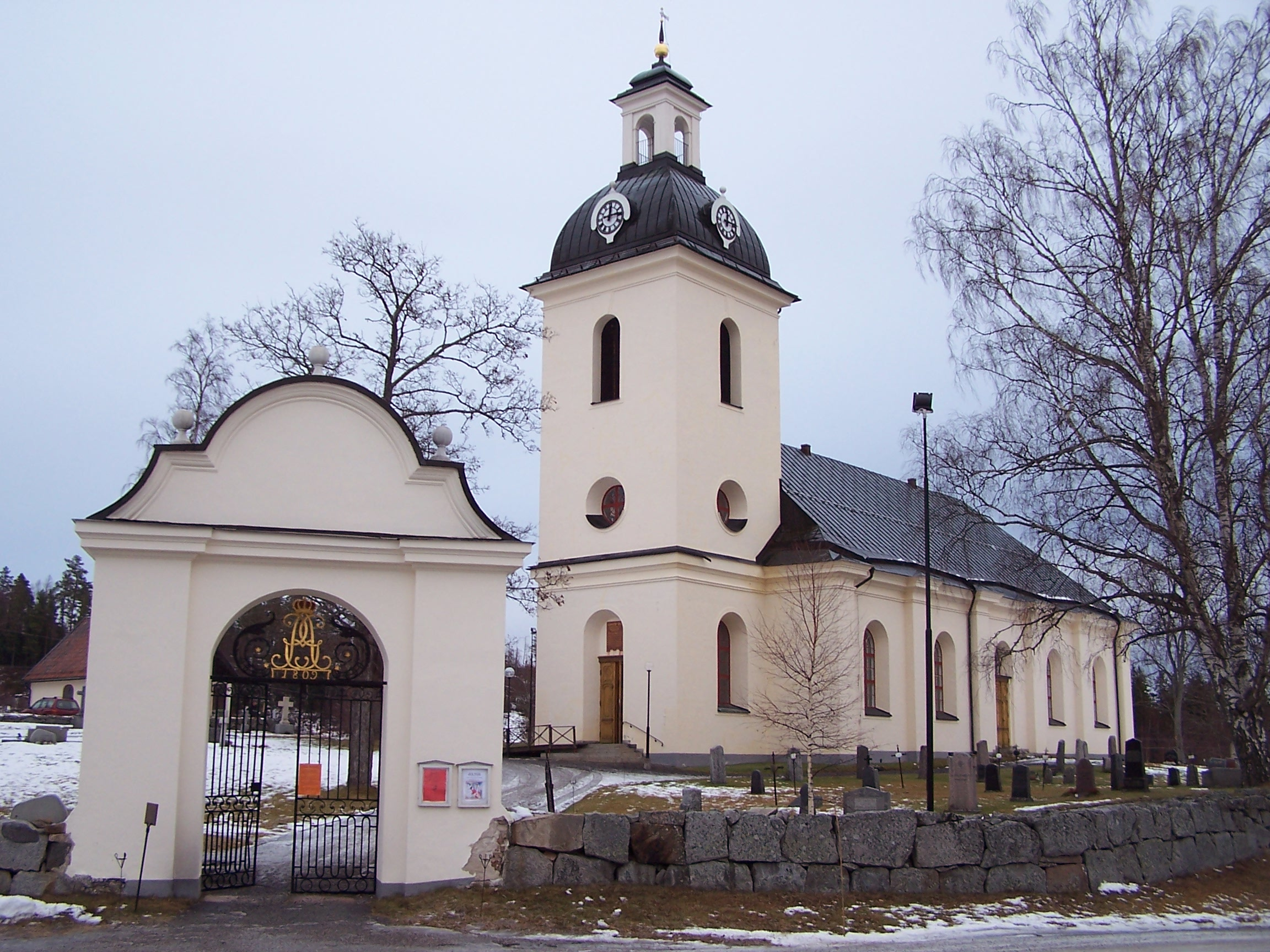
- Interactive map of Högsjö parish

Högsjö is a parish in Ångermanland in Sweden. It contains Högsjö new church (Högsjö nya kyrka) and Högsjö old church (Högsjö gamla kyrka). In 1971 the parish became part of Härnösand Municipality.
