= SS Dorrigo =

Cargo and passenger steam ship

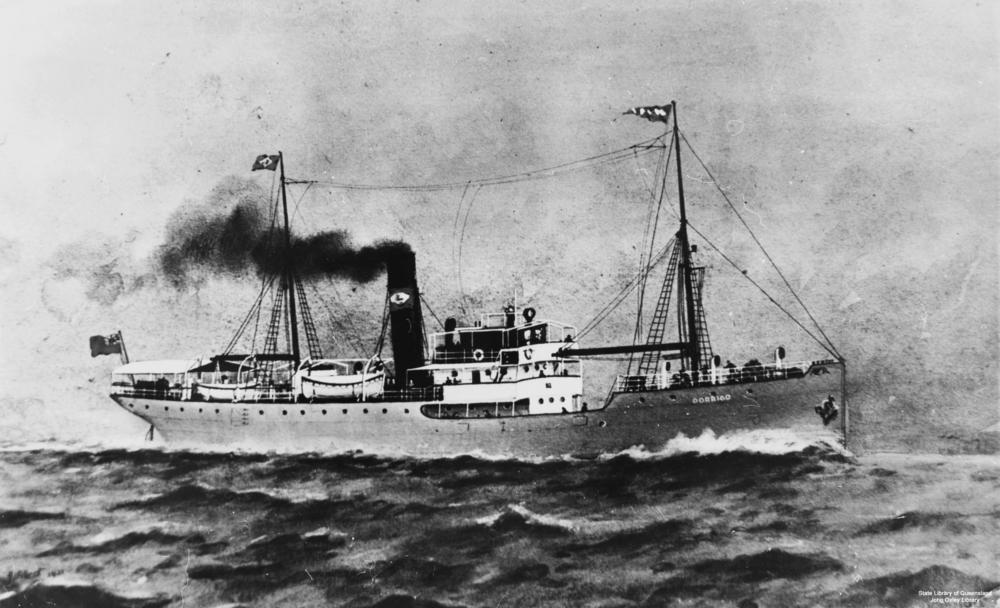

History

Australia
- Name: SS Dorrigo (1922–1925); Saint Francois (1913–1922)
- Owner: John Burke and Co Ltd, Brisbane 1925–1925; North Coast Steam Navigation Co, Sydney 1925–1925; Langley W. & Sons, Sydney 1922–1925; Compagnie Navale de l'Océanie, Bordeaux 1913–1922
- Port of registry: Sydney
- Builder: Smiths Dock Company, Middlesbrough
- Yard number: 561
- Launched: 15 October 1913
- Completed: December 1913
- Identification: Official number: 150169
- Fate: Wrecked, 4 April 1926

General characteristics
- Type: Iron screw steamer
- Tonnage: 683 GRT 359 net register tons (NRT)
- Length: 180.3 ft (55.0 m)
- Beam: 29.5 ft (9.0 m)
- Draught: 14.5 ft (4.4 m)
- Installed power: Triple expansion engine (16 inches (41 cm),26 inches (66 cm), 43 inches (109 cm) x 27 inches (69 cm)), 96 nhp
- Propulsion: Single screw

SS Dorrigo was a cargo and passenger steam ship that sank on 2 April 1926 with the loss of 22 of the 24 people on board. It was built under the name of Saint Francois by the Smiths Dock Company at the South Bank in Middlesbrough on the River Tees in Northeast England for the Compagnie Navale de l'Océanie for the Pacific Island postal and general trade service, for which it sailed the waters of the Pacific from 1914 to 1921.

The ship suffered minor damage during the First World War during the Bombardment of Papeete, prior to coming into the hands of the Langley Bros who placed it in the Sydney to Coffs Harbour route from 1922 to 1925. Upon the demise of the Langley Bros shipping firm in 1925 the vessel came into the service of John Burke and Co and was used for the Northern Queensland runs prior to its loss on 2 April 1926.

== Ship description and construction ==
=== The ship builder ===
The SS Dorrigo was originally built under the name of Saint Francois by the Smiths Dock Company established by Thomas Smith who bought William Rowe's shipyard at St. Peter's in Newcastle upon Tyne in 1810 and traded as William Smith & Co. The company became associated with South Bank in Middlesbrough on the River Tees in Northeast England, after opening an operation there in 1907. Smiths Dock increasingly concentrated its shipbuilding business at South Bank, with its North Shields Yard being used mainly for repair work.

=== Ship description ===
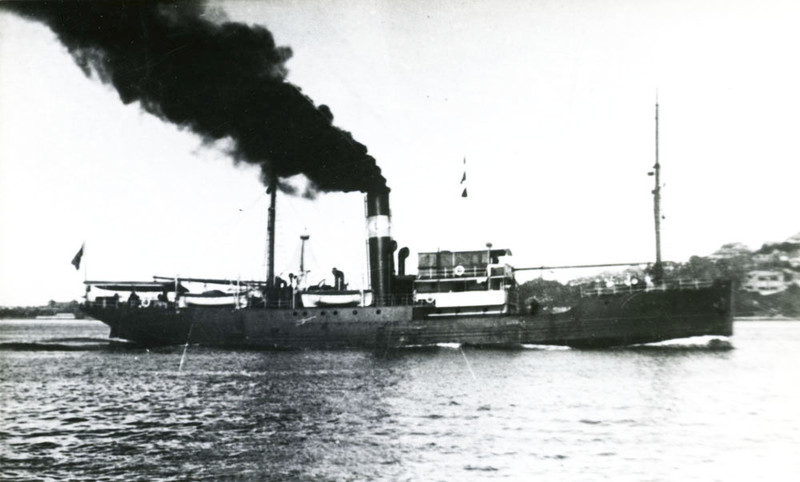
Dorrigo underway in Port Jackson

The vessel was described as being a fine type of modern passenger and cargo steamer. It was specifically built for the mail service between the French Islands and had comfortable first class accommodation for 25 passengers situated in the deck, amidships, with electric bells, lights and fans to each berth. Adjoining the dining saloon which was also on the deck was a stately smoke lounge room. The vessel also had accommodation for 20 second-class passengers, situated under the promenade deck and described as in keeping with the first-class accommodation in the matter of comfort.

The vessel was fitted with a powerful searchlight and wireless, and all the latest appliances.

The vessel was a steel single deck and the bridge ship with two masts. Its dimensions were:

Length from foredeck of stem to stern post: 180.3 feet (54.96 m)
Main breadth to outside plank: 29.5 feet (8.99 m)
Depth from uppermost continuous deck to bottom of the hold: 14.5 feet (4.42 m)

The vessel measured

683 gross register tons (GRT) and a
359 net register tons (NRT)

==== Propulsion ====
Dorrigo was powered by a single steel boiler producing 180 pounds per square inch (1,200 kPa) of steam pressure.

This steam fed a triple-expansion steam engine. It had cylinders of 16 inches (410 mm), 26 inches (660 mm) and 43 inches (1,100 mm) bore by 27 inches (690 mm) stroke, developed 96 NHP. The engines were capable of maintaining a speed of 14 knots (26 km/h).

== Ship service history ==
=== The steamer Saint Francois, Pacific Service with Compagnie Navale de l'Océanie 1913–1922 ===
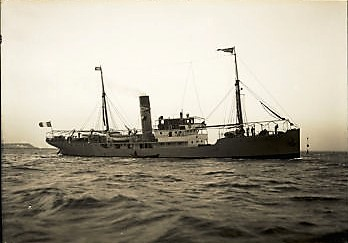
SS Dorrigo as the SS Saint Francois undergoing sea trials in 1913

In November 1914 Saint Francois arrived in Auckland from Tahiti to undergo a general overhaul.

The small passenger and cargo steamer first arrived at Sydney on Thursday 8 April 1915 from Tahiti, via Nouméa, with 350 tons of copra. The steamer was normally engaged in the inter-island trade between Tahiti and other South Sea islands.

The Saint Francois next arrived in Sydney from Nouméa to undergo repairs to her stern in late February 1916, which had been considerably damaged in Tahiti, with the estimate of the cost of the work is £2000.

In April 1916 the Saint Francois was involved in the rescue of the steamer Flora. The Flora had left Auckland on 11 April for the Eastern Pacific, and all went well until the ship was about 150 miles (240 km) out from Rarotonga, en route for Raiatea, when one of the two crank-shafts broke. When the mishap occurred the engineers of the Flora set to work to try to effect repairs. For four and a half days and nights the vessel drifted, while the engineers toiled in the sweltering heat of the engine room. On the fifth day temporary repairs were effected, and the vessel was once more brought under control. Two hours and a half later the rivets joining the broken shaft gave way, and the Flora again began to drift. Shortly afterwards it came into touch with the French steamer Saint Francois. Up to this time the weather had been fine, but when the Saint Francois hove into sight there were lowering clouds, and every indication of a storm. The Flora was taken in tow and Papeete was reached three days and three hours later, the distance of 437 miles (703 km) being covered at an average speed of 5 3/4 miles (9.3 km) per hour

During 1920 the Saint Francois was involved in towing the hulks Pey Berland and Chateau Baret (formerly the British barque Cadwgan) back to New Caledonia. Both hulks had typically imported chromium ore into Australia and took coal back to New Caledonia.

==== WWI Service ====
In October 1914 the C&O companies Saint Francois arrived in Auckland from Raratonga for repairs, coal and water. The crew gave statements that the capital of Tahiti Papeete had been bombarded by German warships. A ricocheting shell had struck the funnel of the Saint Francois with another hole also in the vessel's hull above the water line. Additionally part of the vessel had undergone repairs for a grounding several months earlier as well as a survey.

=== Langley W. & Sons Service 1922–1925 ===
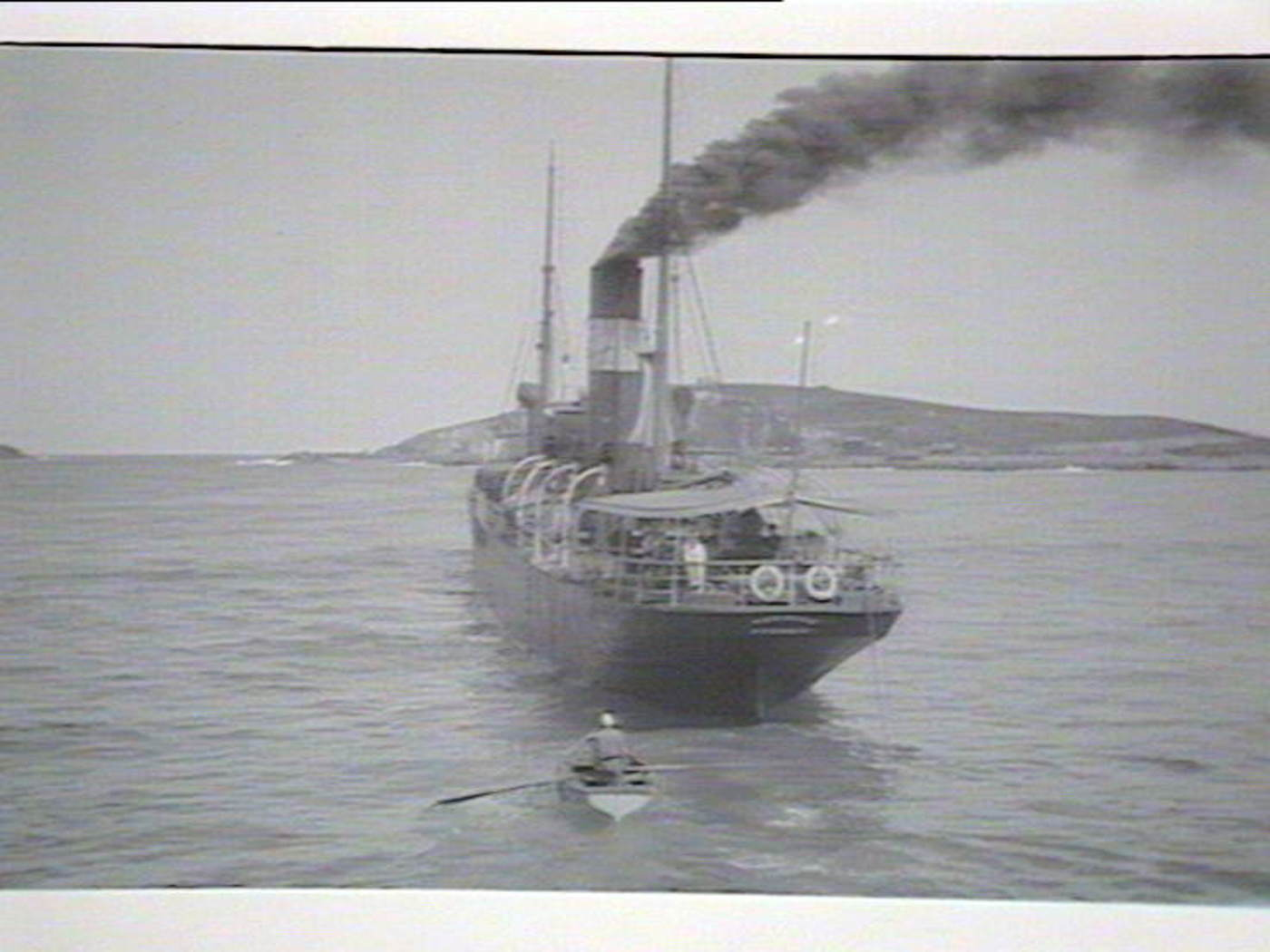
Dorrigo leaving Coffs Harbour

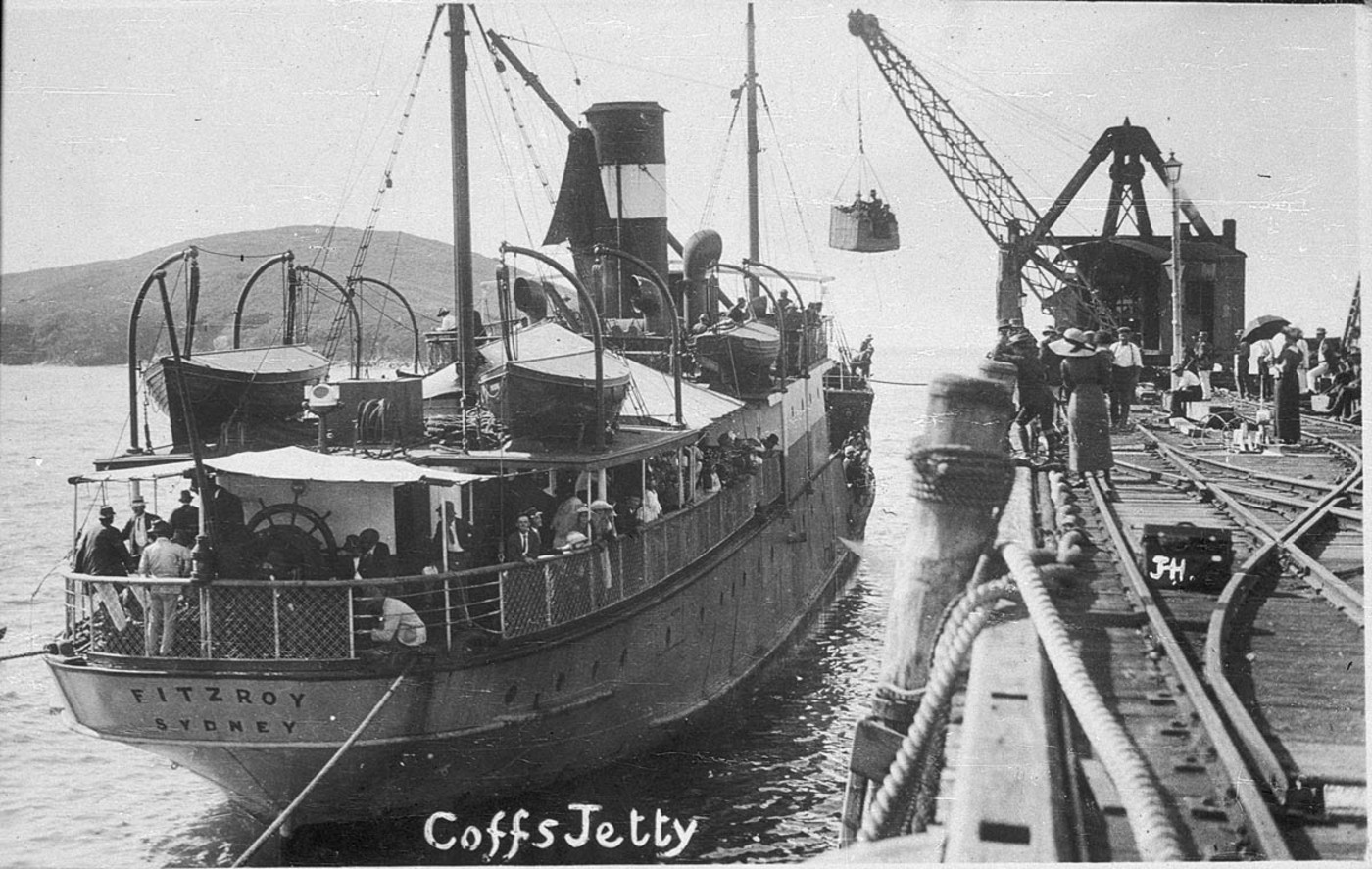
The Vessel SS Fitzroy at Coffs Harbour which the Dorrigo replaced upon its loss

In October 1921 Messrs. Langley Bros. purchased the Saint Francois and renamed the vessel Dorrigo to replace the ill-fated Fitzroy, which foundered off the coast the previous June, and the vessel was placed into the same Coffs Harbour to Sydney route. At this time the vessel was also modified with part of the after hold being converted into a butter chamber, to carry 5,000 boxes of butter to meet the increasing coastal trade.

On Thursday 9 December the Dorrigo first arrived on its maiden run for Woolgoolga and Coffs Harbour for the passenger and cargo traffic trade between Sydney. An open invitation to visit and inspect her during the morning was extended to the public. The vessel was described as to all intents and purposes a new ship and representing the last word in comfort for the coastal service, and capable of covering the distance between Coffs Harbour and Sydney in about 17 hours.

By April 1925 the shipping firm of Langley Bros, went into voluntary liquidation with the shipping fleet offered for sale by public tender following serious competition from the New South Wales Government railways in the Coff's Harbour trade. The Dorrigo had been laid up since December 1924 owing to the falling off in passenger receipts.

=== John Burke and Co Ltd Service 1925 ===
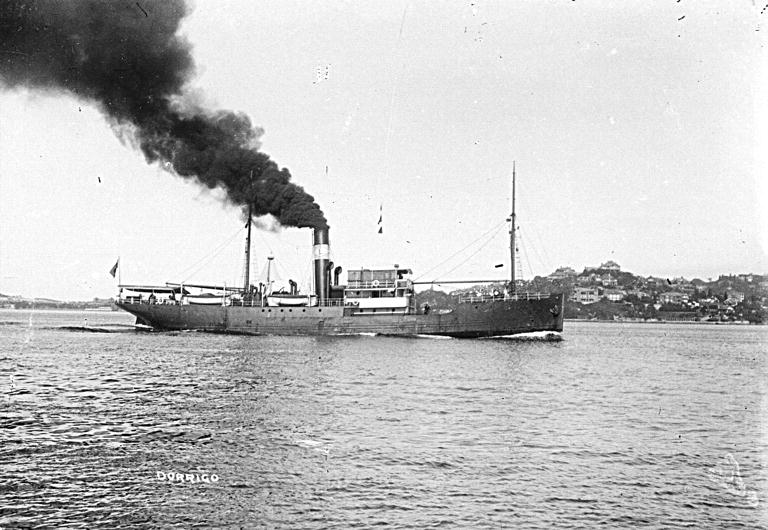
SS Dorrigo

In July 1925 it was announced that The passenger steamer Dorrigo, which since 1921 had been engaged in the passenger and cargo service between Sydney and Coff's Harbour, had been purchased by John Burke, Ltd., for use in trade between Brisbane and North Queensland ports. The vessel had only recently been purchased by the North Coast Steam Navigation Company, with other vessels of the Langley fleet. It was intended to run between Brisbane and Cooktown via ports, and expected to extend sailings to Thursday Island, when cargoes warranted.

Upon arrival of the cargo steamer Dorrigo at Cairns in September 1925 the cargo was declared "black" by the waterside workers who were engaged in a dispute and who then decided not to remove the cargo from Brisbane, of which there were 100 tons for Cairns. The ship left again for Brisbane via Townsville and Bowen with the Cairns cargo still aboard.

== Sinking of the SS Dorrigo ==
The Dorrigo left Brisbane at 7 pm on 1 April for Thursday Island and intermediate northern ports carried a crew of 24, most of whom were residents of Brisbane and with between 500–600 tons of general cargo, including some benzene and kerosene.

When the Dorrigo was ready to leave Brisbane on Thursday afternoon it was reported to the master that one of the firemen was ill. He was given attention, but his condition was such that it was deemed advisable to take him ashore. In his stead J. Wrench, a well-known seafarer of Brisbane, joined the ship ten minutes before it sailed.

The steamer Dorrigo foundered at 6 am on Friday 2 April 1926 off Double Island Point.

The first report of the disaster was not 'flashed across' the seas until an early hour on Saturday night. Then the lighthouse at Double Island Point had flashed to him a hurried alarm and a call of the mariner's "S.O.S." This was followed by a despatch intimating briefly the first news of the wreck. Within three hours of the flashes of the first word Brisbane was advised.

It was reported by the Captain of the Dorrigo that the vessel had foundered with Double Island Point lighthouse, bearing north-west 14 miles (23 km). The Steamer Moruya had picked up a raft with Captain C. W. Gray and his son W. E. Gray on board.

The cargo from the Dorrigo had been washed ashore along a 10-mile (16 km) stretch of beach at Fraser's Island. Cabin doors, cased goods and kerosene were included in the wreckage, but the searchers had failed in their search for survivors.

It was claimed at the time by J. E. Burke, the governing director of John Burke, Limited shipping company that the Dorrigo "was exceedingly sea worthy and we were perfectly satisfied, with her. I cannot understand how the vessel foundered, more particularly as last week she was in the cyclone that dealt severely with the Cooma, and she entered port only a few hours late. She was a speedy vessel, and invariably did the trip from Brisbane to Sydney in 41 or 42 hours. These facts, combined with the knowledge that she was on her second voyage since her last overhaul, leads me to believe that something very remarkable lies contributed to her destruction."

It was reported that the Captain and his son had survived the wreck and 30 hours lost at sea with tiger sharks 3 to 12 ft (0.91 to 3.66 m) in length nosing around the makeshift raft-of the aft deck sun awning-upon which they floated after the steamer had foundered.

=== Wreck location and wreckage ===
The wreck site is yet to be found.
