= 1926 Connecticut lieutenant gubernatorial election =

- November 2, 1926
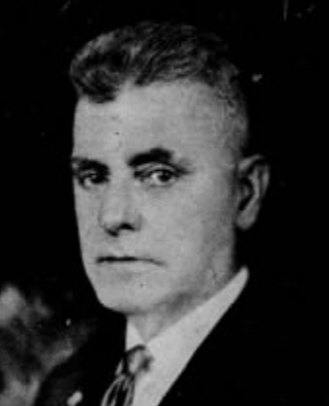

Nominee	J. Edwin Brainard	Milo R. Waters
Party	Republican	Democratic
Popular vote	192,161	106,773
Percentage	64.30%	35.70%
Lieutenant Governor before election
J. Edwin Brainard
Republican
Elected Lieutenant Governor
J. Edwin Brainard
Republican

The 1926 Connecticut lieutenant gubernatorial election was held on November 2, 1926, to elect the lieutenant governor of Connecticut. Incumbent Republican lieutenant governor J. Edwin Brainard won re-election against Democratic nominee Milo R. Waters.

== General election ==
On election day, November 2, 1926, incumbent Republican lieutenant governor J. Edwin Brainard won re-election with 64.30% of the vote, thereby retaining Republican control over the office of lieutenant governor. Brainard was sworn in for his second term on January 5, 1927.

=== Results ===
Connecticut lieutenant gubernatorial election, 1926
Party	Candidate	Votes	%
Republican	J. Edwin Brainard (incumbent)	192,161	64.30
Democratic	Milo R. Waters	106,773	35.70
Total votes		298,934	100.00
Republican hold			
