= Novelette (ballet) =

Novelette is a solo modern dance work choreographed by Martha Graham to an existing piece of music, Op. 99, No. 9 from Robert Schumann's Bunte Blätter, also known as Colored Leaves. The ninth movement from the piano solo, also titled Novelette, is a three-minute long piece in B-minor. The ballet premiered on April 18, 1926 at New York's 48 Street Theater in the first independent concert presented by Graham.

The all-Graham program also featured the solos: Intermezzo, Maid with the Flaxen Hair, Clair de Lune, Desir, Deux Valses, Masques, From a Century Tapestry and A Study in Lacquer, and works for members of the newly-formed Martha Graham Concert Group: Tanze, Arabesque No. 1, The Marionette Show and Chorale, which also included Graham.

In her autobiography Blood Memory, Graham wrote that everything she did that night "was influenced by Denishawn," but added the audience came because she was "such a curiosity - a woman who could do her own work."
