= Cabotage Day =

Turkish merchant marine annual festival

Cabotage Day (Turkish: Kabotaj Bayramı) also called Maritime and Cabotage Day is an annual celebration related to merchant marine rights of Turkey held on 1 July in Turkey.

During the Ottoman Empire, the precursor of Turkey, coastwise shipping was mostly carried off by foreign companies as permitted by the Capitulations of the Ottoman Empire. However, by the Treaty of Lausanne signed on 24 July 1923, the capitulations were abolished. The length of Turkish coast (Anatolian and Thracian peninsulas) is 8,333 kilometres (5,178 mi) and by the Cabotage act no 815 enacted on 19 April 1926 Turkey declared that only Turkish vessels were permitted to serve along this coastline. The law took effect on 1 July, the same year and this date is now known as the "cabotage day". Beginning by 2007 the name of the day was changed to "Maritime and Cabotage Day".
