= 1926 Monegasque general election =

General elections were held in Monaco on 18 April 1926 to elect 12 members of the National Council. The national councilmen were elected by a 30-member Electoral College.

== Electoral College ==
The 30-member Electoral College consisted of nine members elected by the Communal Council and 21 members elected by voters. It also had substitute members elected by the Communal Council and six substitute members elected by voters.

=== Members elected by Communal Council ===
The Communal Council held an election for nine members and three substitute members of the Electoral College on 20 March 1926.

=== Members elected by voters ===
==== First round ====
An election of the remaining 21 Electoral College members and six substitute members was held on 21 March 1926. Only 20 candidates got a majority of votes to be elected in the first round.

	Candidates	Votes
Members	Jean Bonafède	489
Members	Joseph Bonafède	480
Members	Albert Pistonatto	472
Members	Jules Gastaud	322
Members	Charles Bernasconi	311
Members	Louis Néri	310
Members	Louis Blanchy	304
Members	Constant Auréglia	303
Members	Étienne Boéri	301
Members	Émile Barral	301
Members	Eugène Marquet Jr.	301
Members	Emmanuel Bœuf	300
Members	Henri Crovetto	300
Members	Louis Sangeorge	298
Members	Joseph Médecin	297
Members	Étienne Fautrier	283
Members	Victor Frolla	281
Members	Michel Porasso	279
Members	Eugène Projetti	275
Members	Albert Sategna	274
Members	Maurice Giordano	269
Members	Charles Vatrican	240
Members	Hermenégilde Vigliani	233
Members	Antoine Icardi	217
Members	Édouard Giordano	209
Members	Louis Settimo	209
Members	Second Armita	208
Members	Louis Notari	206
Members	Lazare Gastaud	204
Members	Henri Bergeaud	203
Members	Charles Mullot	201
Members	Jean Vatrican	201
Members	René Gastaud	200
Members	Joseph Raimbert	200
Members	Laurent Jioffredy	199
Members	Louis Bœuf	197
Members	François Picco	192
Members	Jules Baud	189
Members	Philippe Fontana	182
Substitute members	Maurice Marchisio	296
Substitute members	François Crovetto	295
Substitute members	Joseph Isoard	294
Substitute members	Jules Bianchi	292
Substitute members	Jean Campana	292
Substitute members	Arthur Linetti	286
Substitute members	Théodore Raimbert	201
Substitute members	Achille Auréglia	200
Substitute members	Auguste Médecin	200
Substitute members	Henri Rapaire	199
Substitute members	Charles Médecin	196
Substitute members	Emile Barral	194
Valid ballots		541
Invalid ballots		18
Total ballots		559
Source: Journal de Monaco

==== Second round ====
An election of the remaining Electoral College member was held on 28 March 1926.

Candidates	Votes
Maurice Giordano	217
Édouard Giordano	2
Joseph Mullot	2
Célestin Allavena	1
Other	1
Valid ballots	220
Invalid ballots	25
Total ballots	245
Source: Journal de Monaco

== National Council ==
The Electoral College voted on members of the National Council on 18 April 1926:

Candidates	Votes
Auguste Settimo	26
Joseph Crovetto	22
Charles Bernasconi	21
Victor Bonafède	21
Michel Fontana	21
Eugène Marquet	21
Henri Marquet	21
Constant Aureglia	18
Félix Bonaventure	17
Henri Crovetto	17
Étienne Fautrier	17
Étienne Boeri	16
Orecchia	7
Dr. Marsan	6
Georges Rapaire	3
Sategna	3
Louis Aureglia	2
Joseph Médecin	2
Pierre Jioffredy	1
Notari	1
Charles Médecin	1
Paul Cioco	1
Dr. Simon	1
Source: Journal de Monaco
