= Chorale (ballet) =

Ballet choreographed by Martha Graham

Chorale is a modern dance work choreographed by Martha Graham to music by César Franck. The piece premiered on April 18, 1926, at New York's 48 Street Theater in the first independent concert presented by Graham. Members of the newly formed Martha Graham Concert Group, Thelma Biracree, Evelyn Sabin and Betty Macdonald, also appeared in the piece. A critic for The Democrat-Chronicle reported the dance was "subtle" with a "dark, emotional mood."

The all-Graham program also featured the ballets: Arabesque No. 1, Clair de Lune, Danse Languide, Danse Rococo, Désir, Deux Valses, Intermezzo, Maid with the Flaxen Hair, The Marionette Show, Masques, Novelette, Portrait--After Beltran-Masses, A Study in Lacquer, Tanze, The Three Gopi Maidens, and Trois Gnossiennes.
