= Phoenicopterus floridanus =

Phoenicopterus floridanus Temporal range: Pliocene

Scientific classification
- Kingdom: Animalia
- Phylum: Chordata
- Class: Aves
- Order: Phoenicopteriformes
- Family: Phoenicopteridae
- Genus: Phoenicopterus
- Species: †P. floridanus

Binomial name
- †Phoenicopterus floridanus Brodkorb, 1953

Extinct species of flamingo

Phoenicopterus floridanus is an extinct species of flamingo that lived during the Pliocene in what is now Florida and potentially North Carolina.

== History ==
Fossil material of Phoenicopterus floridanus was first described in 1953 by Pierce Brodkorb based on material discovered in the phosphate deposits of southern Florida, specifically the Bone Valley Formation in Polk County. The holotype, the distal portion of a tibiotarsus, was discovered the year prior by George C. Elmore. In the type description Brodkorb also mentions the shaft of a tibiotarsus as well as the distal ends of two tarsometatarsi belonging to differently sized individuals, all collected from the same locality as the holotype. These remains marked the first time flamingo fossils had been discovered in the eastern United States, as all previously named North American fossil flamingos stemmed from the west. In 2001, additional material including cervical vertebrae were tentatively assigned to Phoenicopterus floridanus by Olson and Rasmussen. This material was discovered in the Yorktown Formation in North Carolina.

== Description ==
Brodkorb described Phoenicopterus floridanus' tibiotarsus as similar to modern Phoenicopterus species, but broader and deeper and with wider intercondylar fossa. The internal condyle is described as more deeply excavated and the supratendinal bridge, which is situated above the condyles, is said to be more oblique. However Brodkorb also mentions that this element is somewhat broken in the type specimen. According to Brodkorb, the state of the supratendinal bridge and the deeply excavated condyles form an intermediate condition between members of the Palaelodidae and the more recent Phoenicopterus. The back of the bone is more compressed with a narrower intercondylar sulcus. The groove that would house the peroneus medius, one of the fibularis muscles, runs almost parallel to the shaft of the bone at its upper end. Initially Phoenicopterus floridanus was also thought differs from all other Phoenicopterus species in the ratio between the width of the distal end and that of the condyles but Pickford et al. determined that a greater sample size shows that this low ratio is entirely within the range of variation seen in the American flamingo.

The species was also compared to the previously described fossil flamingos of North America. P. floridanus was noted as being significantly larger than Phoenicopterus stocki from Pliocene Mexico and for having wider anterior intercondylar fossa and smaller condyles than the Pleistocene Phoenicopterus copei. The later species also had a generally broader distal tibiotarsus. The condition of the intercondylar fossa that differentiates P. floridensis from P. copei also serves to set the species apart from Harrisonavis of Oligocene Europe.

Much like the distal end, the referred shaft of the tibiotarsus is wider and deeper than in extant Phoenicopterus. The second trochlea is narrower than in P. copei and oriented less towards the third trochlea and the facet for the second toe resembles more that of the Chilean flamingo than P. copei, as it is more perpendicular rather than oblique. The distal foramen resemble the greater flamingo the most out of the Phoenicopterus species known at the time, which excludes Phoenicopterus minutus and Phoenicopterus novaehollandiae. The later species can still be differentiated via the distal foramen however, as it is perforated in P. floridanus. The Floridian species also differs clearly from the Australian form through the lack of the characteristic second trochlea anatomy as well as having a deeper shaft.

There are some differences between Phoenicopterus floridanus from Florida and the Phoenicopterus cf. floridanus material mentioned by Olson and Rasmussen from North Carolina. Namely, the two differ in regards to the supratendinal bridge and the tendinal groove. The North Carolina material also appears to be larger than the average of the Florida material, but still smaller than the largest Bone Valley specimen.
