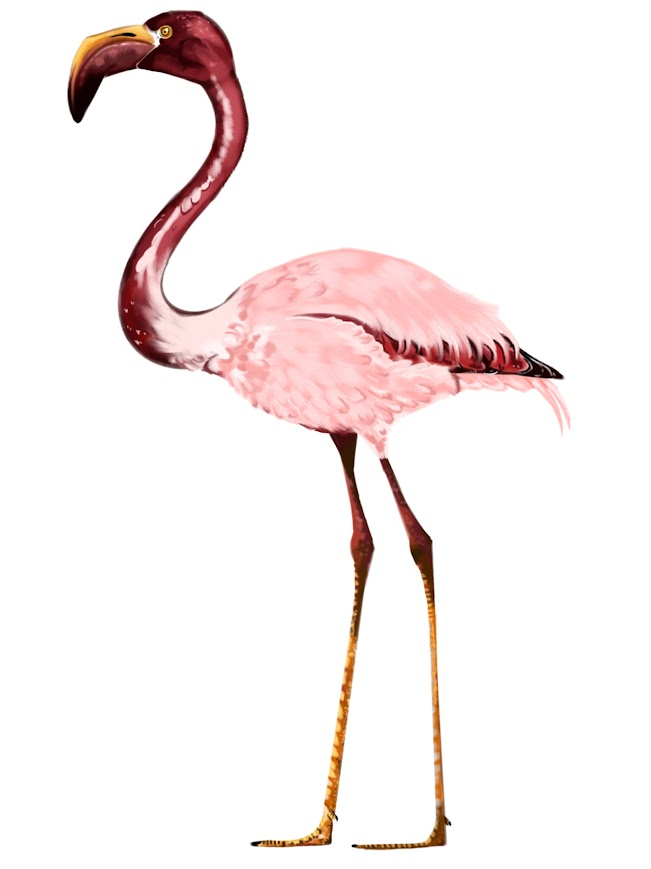
- Restoration of X. tibialis.

Scientific classification
- Kingdom: Animalia
- Phylum: Chordata
- Class: Aves
- Order: Phoenicopteriformes
- Family: Phoenicopteridae
- Genus: †Xenorhynchopsis; De Vis, 1905

Species
- Xenorhynchopsis minor De Vis, 1905; Xenorhynchopsis tibialis De Vis, 1905

= Xenorhynchopsis =

Xenorhynchopsis Temporal range: Pliocene–Pleistocene

Extinct genus of bird

Xenorhynchopsis is an extinct genus of flamingo from the Pliocene to Pleistocene Lake Eyre basin of Australia. Initially described as species of stork, the two known Xenorhynchopsis species are vastly different in size. X. minor is the older and smaller of the two species, ranging from the Pliocene to Pleistocene and being described as having reached a size smaller than that of the lesser flamingo. X. tibialis meanwhile appears to have been restricted to Pleistocene strata and was notably bigger, being counted as one of the biggest known flamingos in the fossil record.

== History ==
The fossils of Xenorhynchopsis were initially described by Charles Walter de Vis in 1905, who recognized two species he named Xenorhynchopsis minor and Xenorhynchopsis tibialis respectively. Possibly due to the fact that de Vis lacked flamingo material in his collection to compare the fossils to, he assigned the genus to the Ciconiidae, the storks. X. tibialis, the larger of the two species, was described on the basis of a humerus and a tibiotarsus found in the Lower Cooper Creek. The smaller species X. minor meanwhile is known from multiple remains of the humerus and tibiotarsus discovered in Pliocene to Pleistocene sediments of Lake Kanunka and the Lower Cooper Creek. Rich and colleagues, who published a revision of the Pliocene and Pleistocene flamingo fossils of material, write that the remains are too fragmentary to determine whether or not these species should be placed in the same genera as modern flamingos. They subsequently retain the genus names coined by de Vis for the sake of convenience.

== Description ==
The traits that distinguish Xenorhynchopsis from other flamingo genera are deemed questionable by Rich and colleagues. The distal end of the tibiotarsus is described as deeper than it is wide with a shaft that flares less towards the distal end when compared to extant species. Towards the distal end the tendinal canal has larger openings, another trait shared by both species and setting them apart from modern flamingos. Additionally, the internal condyle lacks a notch in both species.

The fossil material of X. tibialis resembles the black-necked stork in size and is larger than that of extant flamingos. Rich and colleagues write that only Phoeniconotius exceeds Xenorhynchopsis tibialis in size. X. minor meanwhile is somewhat smaller, if stouter, than the lesser flamingo and approximately in the same size range as Phoenicopterus stocki and Phoenicopterus minutus.

== Paleobiology ==
During the Pliocene at least three flamingo species existed at Lake Kanunka, Xenorhynchopsis minor, Phoeniconaias proeses and what may be the modern greater flamingo. Xenorhynchopsis tibialis appears to have been limited to the Pleistocene and possibly died out when the inland lakes these birds depended on dried up, leading to the local extinction of flamingos in Australia. All four species could be found in the sediments of Lower Cooper Creek, however due to them appearing in different localities, many of which lack precise information regarding their age, it is uncertain if they actually occurred alongside one another. According to Camens and Worthy, footprints found in the Tirari Formation may have been left by Xenorhynchopsis minor, as they appear to be too large to be attributed to P. proeses and too small to have belonged to X. tibialis. The greater flamingo is however another possible candidate.
