= Phoenicopterus minutus =

Phoenicopterus minutus Temporal range: Late Pleistocene

Scientific classification
- Domain: Eukaryota
- Kingdom: Animalia
- Phylum: Chordata
- Class: Aves
- Order: Phoenicopteriformes
- Family: Phoenicopteridae
- Genus: Phoenicopterus
- Species: †P. minutus

Binomial name
- †Phoenicopterus minutus Howard, 1955

Extinct species of bird

Phoenicopterus minutus is an extinct species of flamingo which inhabited California during the Late Pleistocene. It was originally discovered in San Bernardino County, California in the Lake Manix beds, where it coexisted with a second, larger flamingo species.

== History ==
The fossils of Phoenicopterus minutus were discovered in the Lake Manix beds during a large scale project conducted by the United States Geological Survey. Although this project had begun in 1947, much of the bird material from Lake Manix was not collected until the 1950s. The material that formed the basis of the taxon consists of a nearly complete tibiotarsus alongside associated tarsometatarsus elements, which accounts for approximately two thirds of said bone. An additional tarsometatarsus fragment is also known, as are two scapulae and a fragment of the coracoid. The species was named by Hildegard Howard in 1955.

== Description ==
Phoenicopterus minutus was said to be the smallest species of flamingo at the time of its description. Specifically, it was stated that the tibiotarsus was 13 mm (0.51 in) shorter than the same element in the smallest available Chilean flamingo skeleton. The distal end was also narrower and more shallow than in Phoenicopterus stocki from middle Pliocene Mexico. These two fossil forms further differ in their anatomy. Whereas the older P. stocki resembles the proportions of the modern American flamingo, P. minutus's shallower tibiotarsus bears closer resemblance to the greater flamingo. The notch present on the internal condyle is central in P. stocki, but moved well behind this point in P. minutus, a condition also seen in the American flamingo. While the tarsometatarsus could not be compared between these two species, there were still differences to extant forms such as the intercotylar tubercles, which are high and narrow. The ratio between the tubercles height to the width is noted to be even bigger than in American flamingos. Both scapula are similar in size but differ in their contour. This however is not overly exceptional as this also occurs in the still living flamingo species. More notable is the shape of the glenoid facet, the part of the shoulder that connects to the upper arms, which is inflated but smaller than in modern species. The coracoid, although larger than would be expected based on the type material, was deemed too incomplete form the basis of any further conclusions.

Although it was initially described as one of the smallest known flamingos, later research uncovered the presence of even smaller species. According to Rich et al., Phoenicopterus minutus was in a similar size range as Xenorhynchopsis minor and Phoenicopterus stocki. They consider Phoeniconaias proeses and Leakeyornis to have been smaller.

== Paleobiology ==
Lake Manix is known for the preservation of a multitude of water birds that lived in the region during the Pleistocene, including a second species of flamingo. This second species, known from juvenile remains that fall within the size range of modern American and greater flamingos has been tentatively assigned to Phoenicopterus copei. In general, the deposits of Lake Manix resemble that of Fossil Lake (Oregon), with a diverse avifauna including pelicans, grebes, cormorants, geese and ducks.
