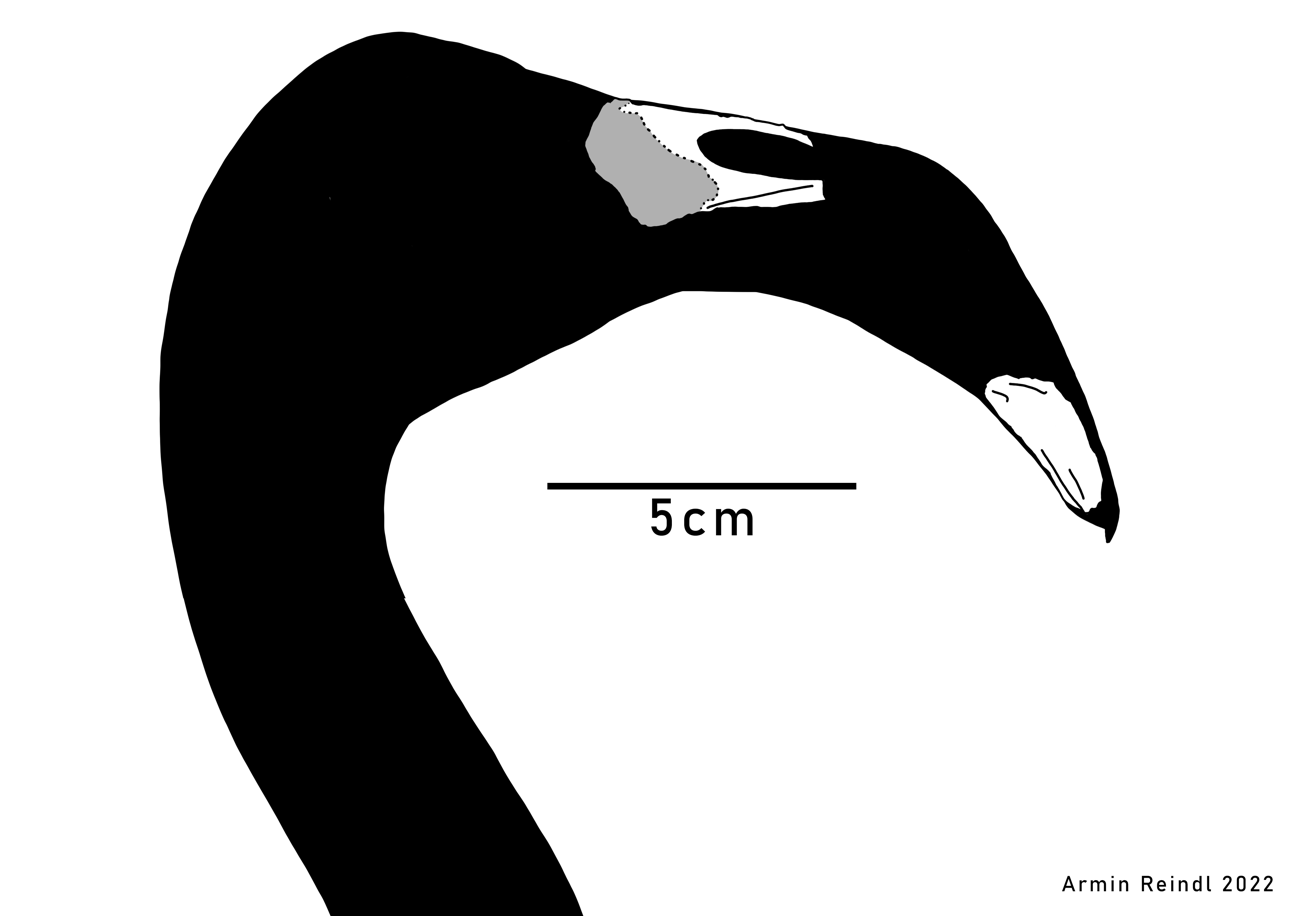
- Known skull remains of Leakeyornis

Scientific classification
- Kingdom: Animalia
- Phylum: Chordata
- Class: Aves
- Order: Phoenicopteriformes
- Family: Phoenicopteridae
- Genus: Leakeyornis; Rich and Walker, 1983

Type species
- Leakeyornis aethiopicus (Harrison and Walker, 1976)

Synonyms
- Phoenicopterus aethiopicus Harrison and Walker, 1976

= Leakeyornis =

Leakeyornis Temporal range: Early Miocene–Middle Miocene

Extinct genus of flamingo

Leakeyornis is an extinct genus of flamingo from the early to middle Miocene of Kenya, primarily in the area of modern day Lake Victoria. Initially described as a species of Phoenicopterus based on an incomplete skull and various limb bones, it was later found to show a mixture of traits found across modern flamingo genera and subsequently placed in its own genus. It contains a single species, Leakeyornis aethiopicus.

== History and naming ==
Various fossils of Leakeyornis were collected by Louis Leakey from Miocene strata of Lake Victoria and later given to the Natural History Museum, London. These remains were first named by Harrison and Walker in 1976 as a species of Phoenicopterus, Phoenicopterus aethiopicus. This description was based on the holotype specimen BMNH A 4382, which represents the back of a beak, while a lower jaw fragment and various appendicular bones were designated as the paratypes. In the years following this publication, additional material was recovered from both Rusinga Island (Hiwegi Formation, Kulu Formation), Maboko Island and Chianda Uyoma. The fossils, representing postcranial elements of the bird, were found to be distinct enough from modern flamingo genera to warrant creating a new genus, Leakeyornis.

The name Leakeyornis honors both Louis Leakey and Mary Leakey for their research into African paleontology.

== Description ==
Although no complete skull is known and postcranial elements of modern flamingo genera are relatively similar to one another, Leakeyornis can be distinguished from other taxa based on various unique features and the combinations of different morphological traits. The skull of Leakeyornis for instance, while incomplete, shows a mixture of features observed in modern flamingo species. In the anatomy of the nares, elongated rather than short, and the palate it most closely resembles the modern greater flamingo. Concerning the palate, flamingo species show projections from the bone which are organized into ridges. In Leakeyornis these palatal projections exhibit a weak double ridge similar to Phoenicopterus, as opposed to a more strongly developed singular ridge. The lower jaw differs from that of Phoenicopterus and instead shows more similarities to those of the lesser flamingo and the South American species within Phoenicoparrus. Specifically, the lower jaw is narrow with a deep anterior groove that tapers more gradually than it does in Phoenicopterus. The mandibular symphysis was likely shallow and the beak was slightly curved downwards like in Phoenicoparrus and Phoeniconaias.

In size Leakeyornis was found to have been smaller than the contemporary Harrisonavis from Europe as well as Phoenicopterus novaehollandiae and Phoenicopterus copei.

Rich and Walker note some differences between specimens found in the Hiwegi Formation and those from the Kulu Formation, however taphonomic distortion coupled with erosion render the meaning and origin of these differences uncertain.

== Paleobiology ==
The oldest remains of Leakeyornis date to the early Miocene and were found on Rusinga Island in the east of Lake Victoria. A femur from Maboko Island indicates that Leakeyornis continued to be present in East Africa until the Middle Miocene, however following its extinction no flamingo fossils are known from Africa until at least the late Pliocene.
