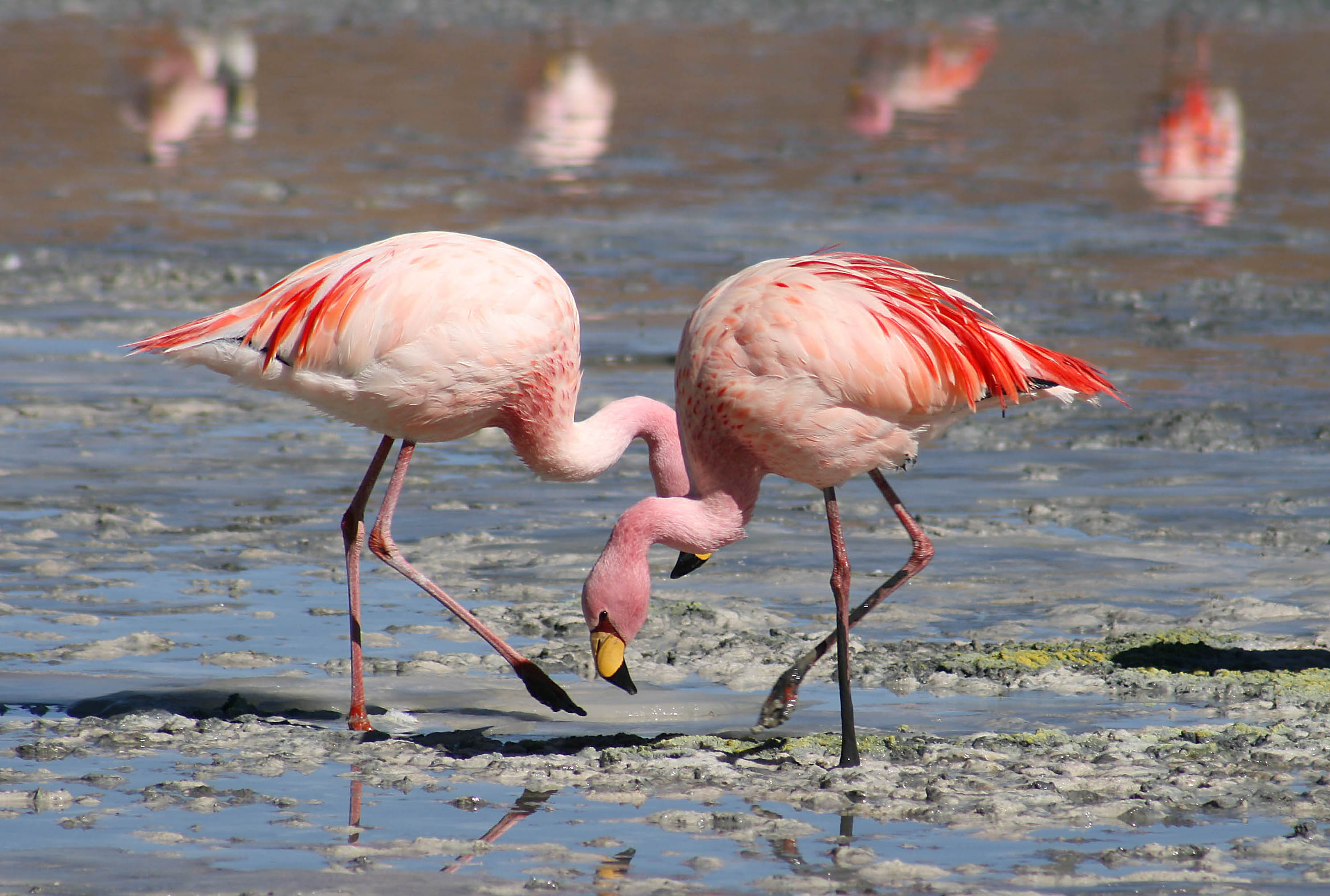
- James's flamingos (P. jamesi)

Scientific classification
- Kingdom: Animalia
- Phylum: Chordata
- Class: Aves
- Order: Phoenicopteriformes
- Family: Phoenicopteridae; Bonaparte, 1831

Genera
- †Elornis?; †Harrisonarvis; †Leakeyornis; †Phoeniconotius; Phoenicopterus; Phoeniconaias; Phoenicoparrus; †Xenorhynchopsis
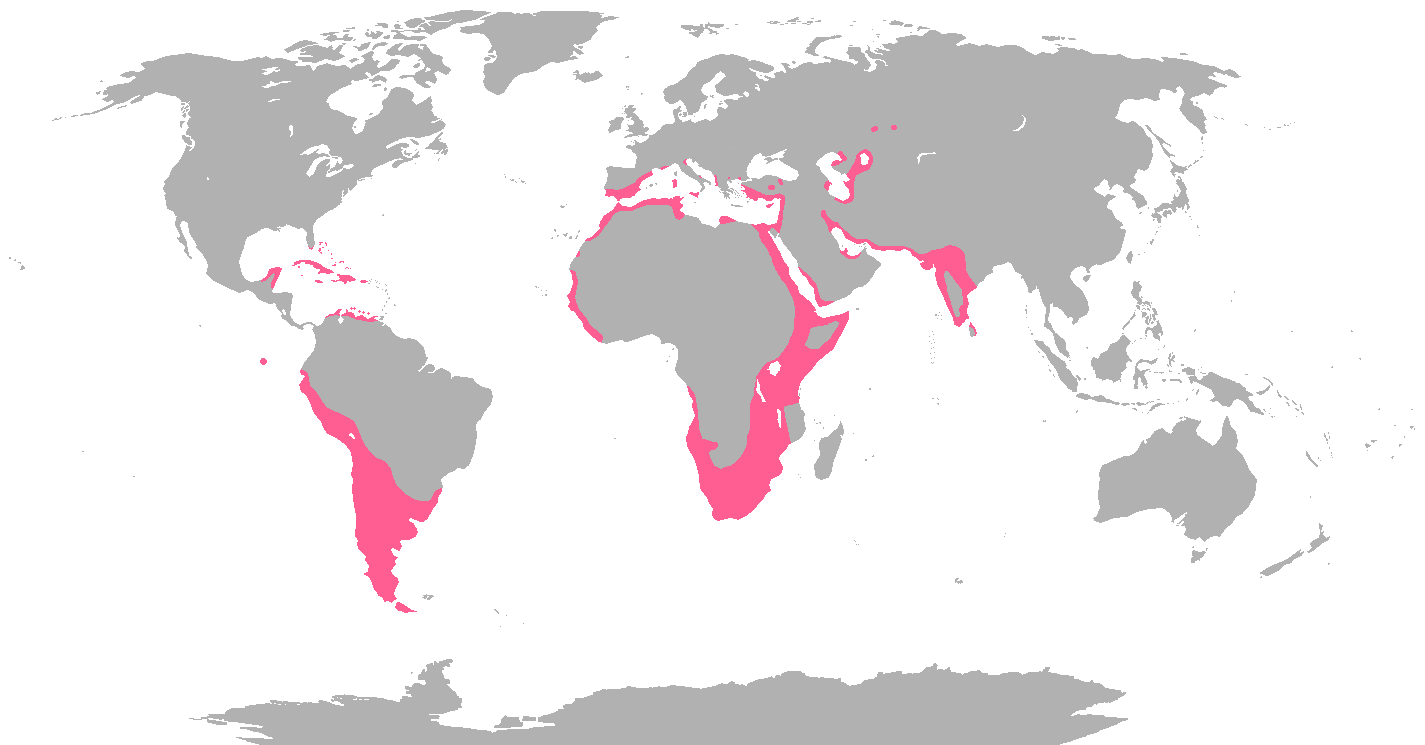
- global distribution

= Flamingo =

Flamingos Temporal range: 25–0 Ma Late Oligocene – Recent

Family of birds

Flamingos or flamingoes (Note: Both forms of the plural are attested, according to the Oxford English Dictionary.) (/fləˈmɪŋɡoʊz/) are a type of wading bird in the family Phoenicopteridae, which is the only extant family in the order Phoenicopteriformes. There are four flamingo species distributed throughout the Americas (including the Caribbean), and two species native to Afro-Eurasia.

== Etymology ==
The name flamingo comes from Portuguese or Spanish flamengo 'flame-coloured'; in turn, the word comes from Provençal flamenc – a combination of flama 'flame' and a Germanic-like suffix -ing. The word may also have been influenced by the Spanish ethnonym flamenco 'Fleming' or 'Flemish'.

In English venery, a group of flamingos is called a "flamboyance", or a "stand".

== Taxonomy and systematics ==
The family Phoenicopteridae was introduced by the French zoologist Charles Lucien Bonaparte in 1831, with Phoenicopterus as the type genus. The name of that genus comes from from Ancient Greek φοινικόπτερος (phoinikopteros) 'crimson/red-feathered'; other genera names include Phoeniconaias, which means 'crimson/red water nymph (or naiad)', and Phoenicoparrus, which means 'crimson/red bird (though, an unknown bird of omen)'.

Traditionally, the long-legged Ciconiiformes, probably a paraphyletic assemblage, have been considered the flamingos' closest relatives and the family was included in the order. Usually, the ibises and spoonbills of the Threskiornithidae were considered their closest relatives within this order. Earlier genetic studies, such as those of Charles Sibley and colleagues, also supported this relationship. Relationships to the waterfowl were considered as well, especially as flamingos are parasitized by feather lice of the genus Anaticola, which are otherwise exclusively found on ducks and geese. The peculiar presbyornithids were used to argue for a close relationship between flamingos, waterfowl, and waders. A 2002 paper concluded they are waterfowl, but a 2014 comprehensive study of bird orders found that flamingos and grebes are not waterfowl, but rather are part of Columbea, along with doves, sandgrouse, and mesites.

=== Relationship with grebes ===
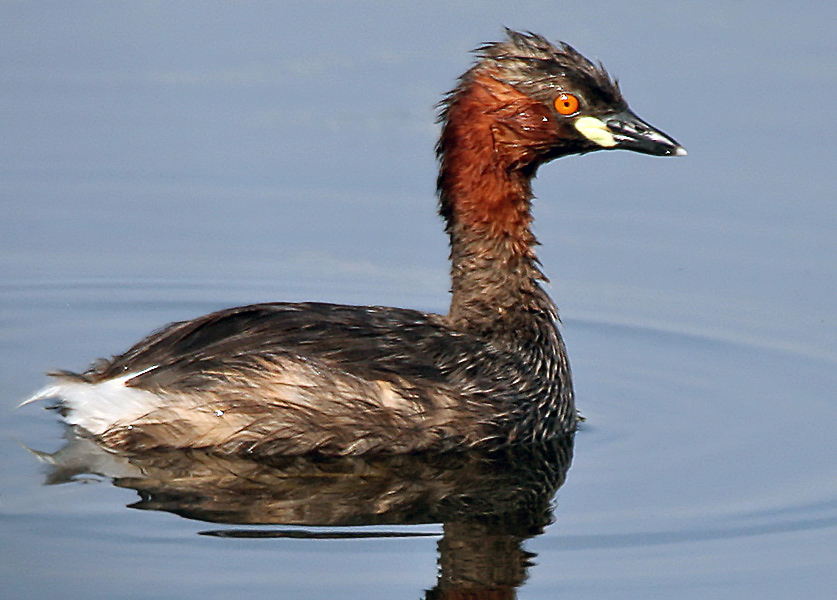
Many molecular and morphological studies support a relationship between grebes and flamingos.

Recent molecular studies have suggested a relation with grebes, while morphological evidence also strongly supports a relationship between flamingos and grebes. They hold at least 11 morphological traits in common, which are not found in other birds. Many of these characteristics have been previously identified on flamingos, but not on grebes. The fossil palaelodids can be considered evolutionarily, and ecologically, intermediate between flamingos and grebes.

For the grebe-flamingo clade, the taxon Mirandornithes ("miraculous birds" due to their extreme divergence and apomorphies) has been proposed. Alternatively, they could be placed in one order, with Phoenocopteriformes taking priority.

=== Phylogeny ===
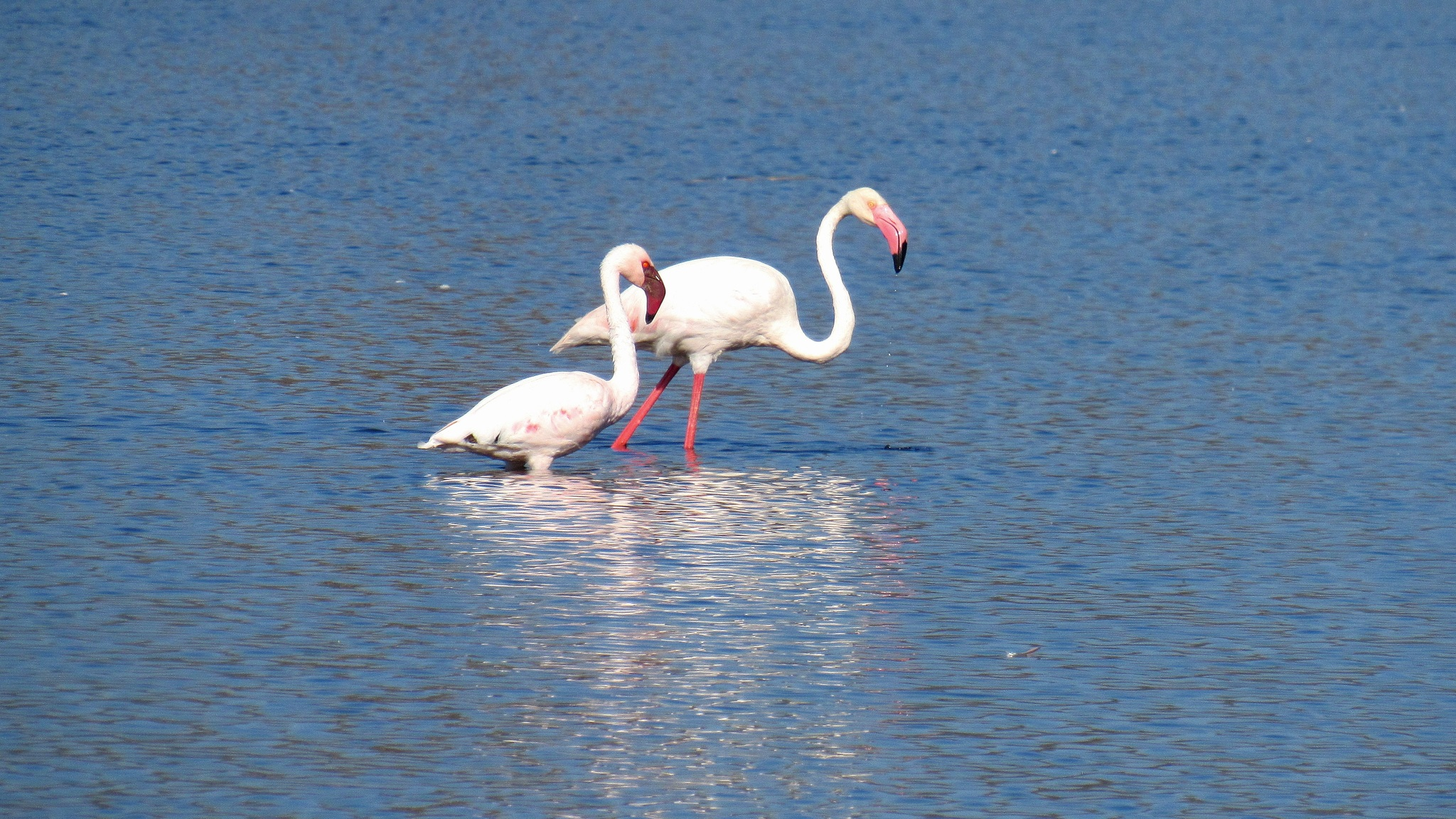
Comparison between lesser and greater flamingos, in Nakuru, Kenya

The cladogram below showing the phylogenetic relationships between the six extant flamingo species is based on a study by Roberto Frias-Soler and collaborators that was published in 2022; the same phylogeny was confirmed by a further study in 2026.

- Phoenicopteriformes Phoenicopteridae
  - - Phoeniconaias
      Lesser flamingo (Phoeniconaias minor)
    - Phoenicoparrus
      - Andean flamingo (Phoenicoparrus andinus)
      - James's flamingo (Phoenicoparrus jamesi)
  - Phoenicopterus
    - Chilean flamingo (Phoenicopterus chilensis)
    - - Greater flamingo (Phoenicopterus roseus)
      - American flamingo (Phoenicopterus ruber)

=== Species ===
Six extant flamingo species are accepted by all recent sources. They were formerly placed in one genus (have common characteristics) Phoenicopterus. As a result of a 2014 publication, the family was reclassified into two genera. In 2020, the family had three recognised genera, according to HBW. A 2026 study suggested a return to two genera, with Phoeniconaias and Phoenicoparrus sufficiently closely related that merging them into one genus made better sense; when merged, the genus Phoenicoparrus (published in 1856) takes priority over Phoeniconaias (1869). The two genera resulting can then be easily defined, with Phoenicopterus having a deep keel bone, and Phoenicoparrus a shallow keel bone.

Image	Species	Geographic location	
	Lesser flamingo Phoeniconaias minor	Old World	Africa (South Africa, Great Rift Valley) to NW India (the most numerous flamingo).
	Andean flamingo Phoenicoparrus andinus	New World	High Andes in Peru, Chile, Bolivia and Argentina.
	James's or Puna flamingo Phoenicoparrus jamesi	New World	High Andes in Peru, Chile, Bolivia and Argentina.
	Chilean flamingo Phoenicopterus chilensis	New World	Temperate S. South America.
	Greater flamingo Phoenicopterus roseus	Old World	Parts of Africa, S. Europe and S. and SW Asia (most widespread flamingo).
	American or Caribbean flamingo Phoenicopterus ruber	New World	Caribbean islands, Caribbean Mexico, southern Florida, Belize, coastal Colombia, northern Brazil, Venezuela and Galápagos Islands. Two subspecies; P. ruber ruber in the Americas, P. ruber glyphorhynchus on the Galápagos Islands.

Prehistoric species of flamingo:

- Elornis? Milne-Edwards, 1868 (Late Oligocene of France, Europe)
- Harrisonavis (Gervais, 1852) (Middle Oligocene–Middle Miocene of C. Europe)
- Leakeyornis (Harrison and Walker, 1976) (Early to Middle Miocene of Lake Victoria, Kenya)
- Phoeniconaias proeses (De Vis 1905) (Pliocene of Lake Kanunka, Australia)
- Phoeniconaias siamensis Cheneval et al. 1991 (Early Miocene of Mae Long Reservoir, Thailand)
- Phoeniconotius Miller 1963 (Late Oligocene of South Australia)
- Phoenicopterus copei (Miller 1963) (Late Pleistocene of North America and Mexico)
- Phoenicopterus floridanus (Brodkorb 1953) (Early Pliocene of Florida)
- Phoenicopterus minutus Howard 1955 (Late Pleistocene of California, US)
- Phoenicopterus novaehollandiae Miller 1963 (Late Oligocene of South Australia)
- Phoenicopterus stocki (Miller 1944) (Middle Pliocene of Rincón, Mexico)
- Xenorhynchopsis De Vis 1905 (Pliocene to Pleistocene of Australia)

== Description ==
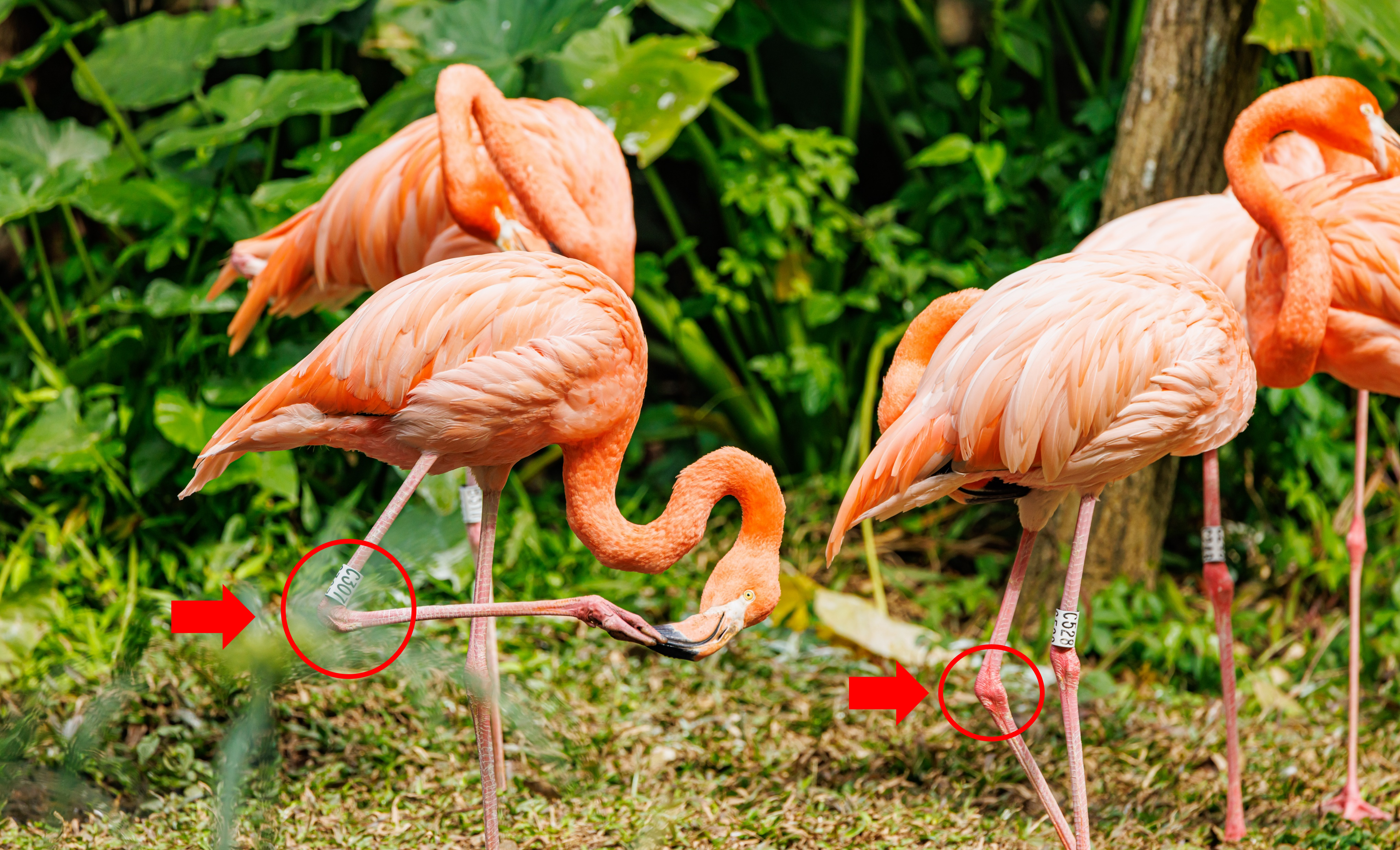
Two flamingos with their ankles circled in red

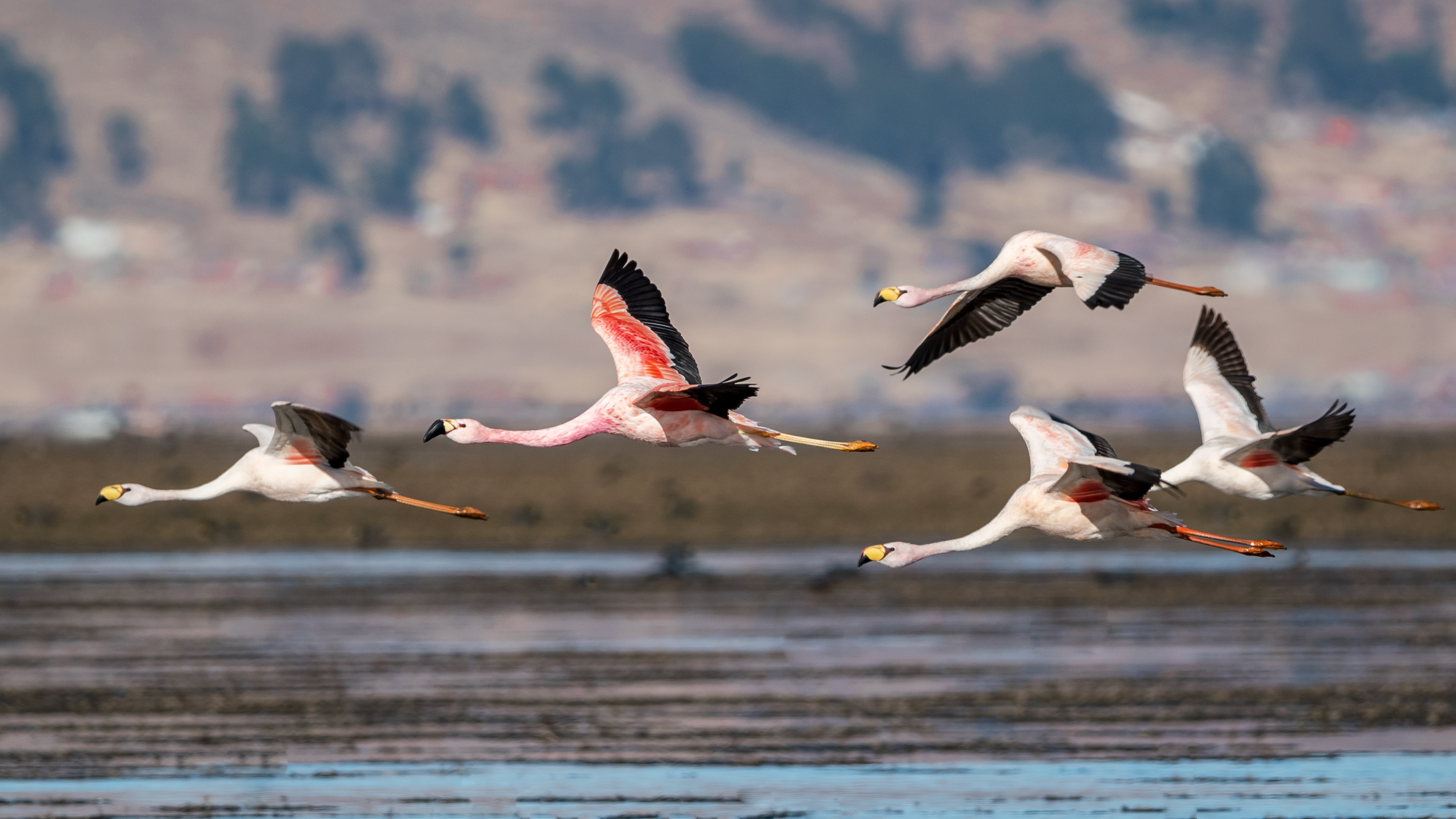
Andean flamingo amidst a flock of James's flamingos, in Bolivia

The greater and American flamingos are the largest of the six different species of flamingos, both standing at 120–145 centimetres (47–57 in) tall, and weighing 2.1–4.1 kilograms (4.6–9.0 lb), while lesser flamingo is the smallest species, with a height of 80–90 centimetres (31–35 in) and weighing 1.5–2 kilograms (3.3–4.4 lb); James's flamingo is only slightly larger at 90–92 centimetres (35–36 in) tall and 2 kilograms (4.4 lb). Flamingos can have a wingspan as small as 95–100 centimetres (37–39 in) in lesser flamingo, to as large as 140–165 centimetres (55–65 in) in greater and American flamingos.

Flamingos usually stand on one leg with the other tucked beneath the body. The reason for this behaviour is not fully understood. One theory is that standing on one leg allows the birds to conserve more body heat, given that they spend a significant amount of time wading in cold water. However, the behaviour also takes place in warm water and is also observed in birds that do not typically stand in water. An alternative theory is that standing on one leg reduces the energy expenditure for producing muscular effort to stand and balance on one leg. A study on cadavers showed that the one-legged pose could be held without any muscle activity, while living flamingos demonstrate substantially less body sway in a one-legged posture.

While walking, a flamingo's legs may appear to bend backwards. This appearance is due to the middle joint on their legs being their ankle, not their knee. Flamingos also have webbed feet that aid with swimming and they may stamp their feet in the mud to stir up food from the bottom.

Flamingos are capable flyers, and flamingos in captivity often require wing clipping to prevent escape. A pair of African flamingos which had not yet had their wings clipped escaped from the Wichita, Kansas, zoo in 2005. One was spotted in Texas 14 years later. It had been seen previously by birders in Texas, Wisconsin and Louisiana.

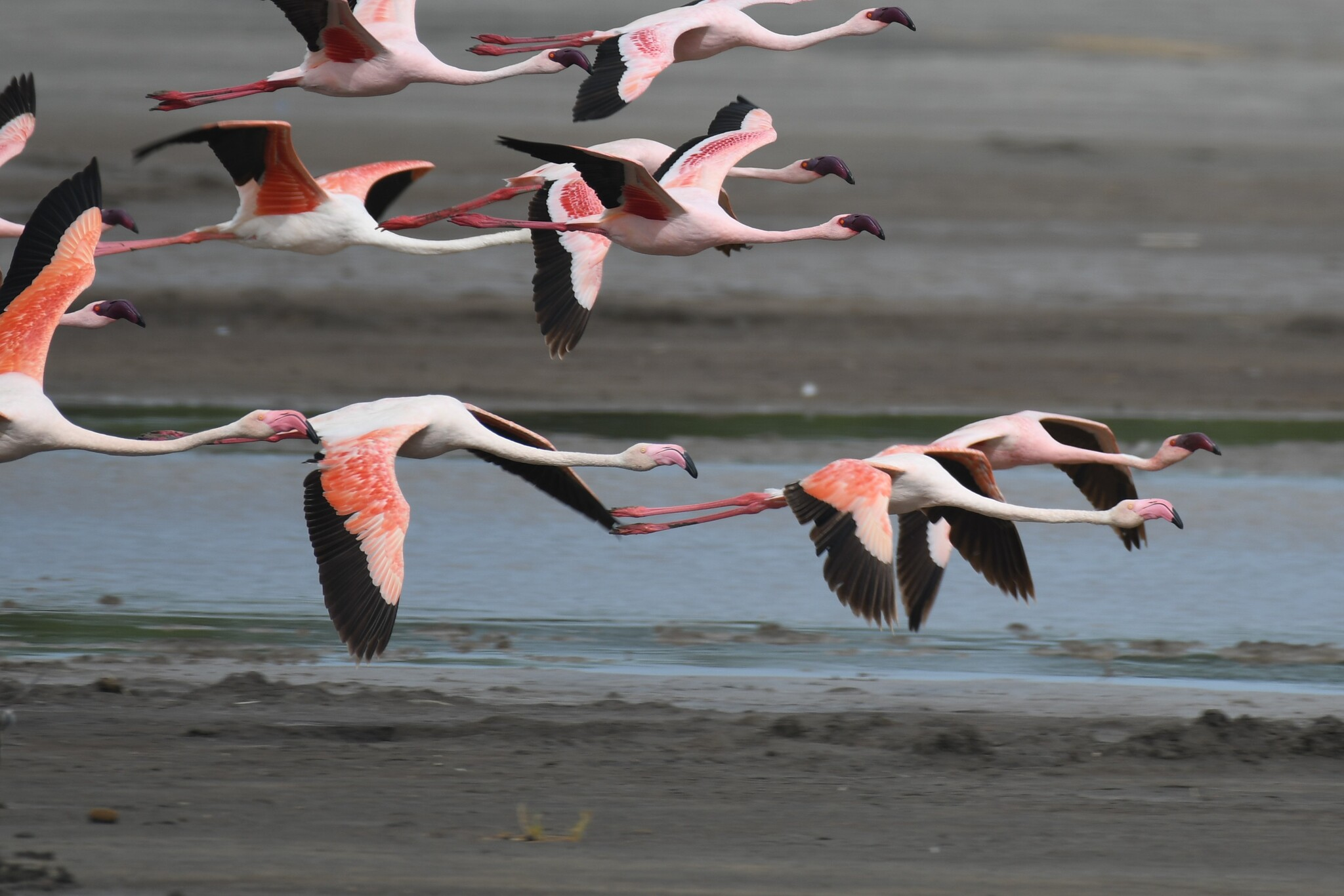
Mixed flock of greater and lesser flamingos, in Tanzania

Young flamingos hatch with greyish-red plumage, but adults range from light pink to bright red due to aqueous bacteria and beta-carotene obtained from their food supply. A well-fed, healthy flamingo is more vibrantly coloured, thus a more desirable mate; a white or pale flamingo is usually unhealthy or malnourished. Captive flamingos are a notable exception; even if adequately nourished, they may turn a pale pink if they are not fed carotene at levels comparable to the wild.

Flamingos can open their bills by raising the upper jaw as well as by dropping the lower.

== Behaviour and ecology ==
=== Feeding ===
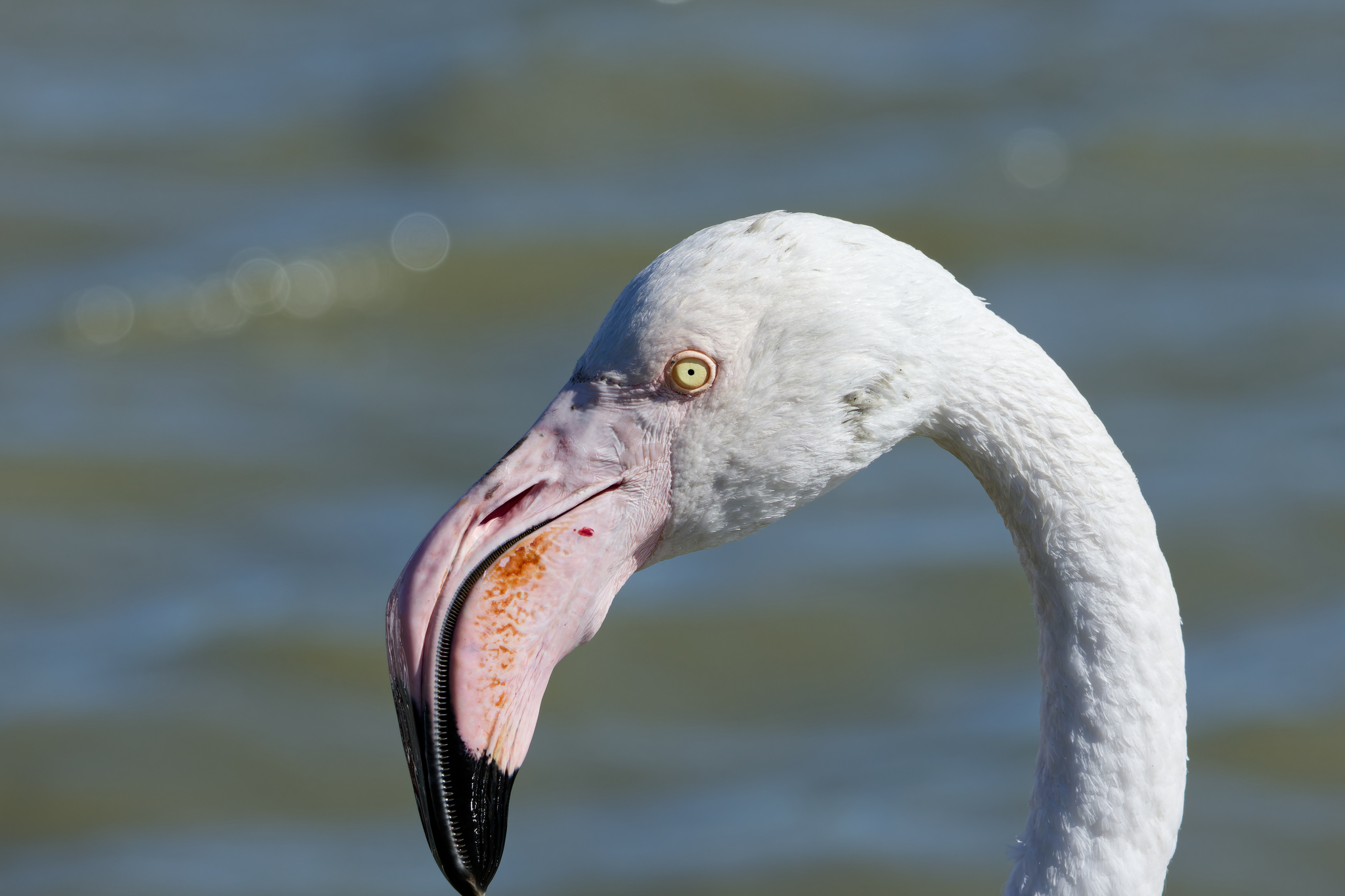
Closeup of a greater flamingo showing the beak's lamellae, in France

Captive American flamingos feeding

Flamingos are omnivores who filter-feed on brine shrimp, cyanobacteria, larvae, insects, mollusks and crustaceans. Their bills are adapted to separate mud and silt from the food they eat and are uniquely used upside-down. The filtering of food is assisted by hairy structures called lamellae, which line the mandible, and their large, rough tongue. By rapidly retracting their head, flamingos generate vortexes that stir up sediment and shrimp. Flamingos further induce directional flows by chattering their beaks, while their stomping creates eddies to trap invertebrates.

The pink or reddish colour of flamingos comes from carotenoids in their diet of animal and plant plankton. American flamingos are a brighter red colour because of the beta carotene availability in their food while the lesser flamingos are a paler pink due to ingesting a smaller amount of this pigment. These carotenoids are broken down into pigments by liver enzymes. The source of this varies by species, and affects the colour saturation. Flamingos whose sole diet is blue-green algae are darker than those that get it second-hand by eating animals that have digested blue-green algae.

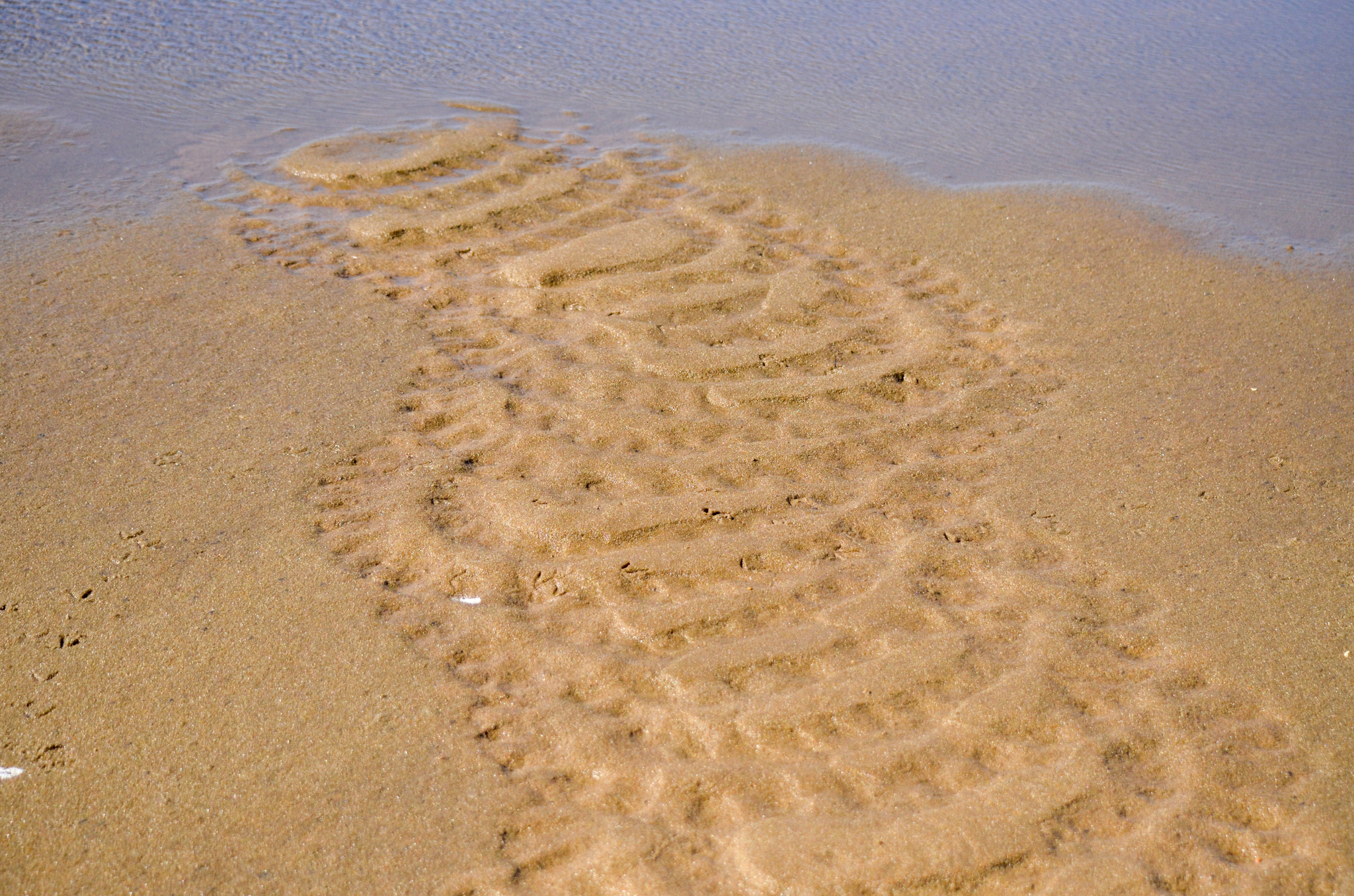
Feeding traces from a Chilean flamingo

Though flamingos prefer to drink freshwater, they are equipped with glands under their eyes that remove extra salt from their bodies. This organ allows them to drink saltwater as well.

=== Vocal behaviour ===
American flamingos calling at the Stone Zoo in Stoneham, Massachusetts, US

Flamingos are considered very noisy birds with their calls ranging from grunting or growling to nasal honking. Vocalizations play an important role in parent-chick recognition, ritualized displays, and keeping large flocks together. Variations in vocalizations exist in the voices of different species of flamingos.

=== Life cycle ===
Flamingos are very social birds; they live in colonies whose population can number in the thousands. These large colonies are believed to serve three purposes for the flamingos: avoiding predators, maximizing food intake, and using scarce suitable nesting sites more efficiently. Before breeding, flamingo colonies split into breeding groups of about 15 to 50 birds. Both males and females in these groups perform synchronized ritual displays. The members of a group stand together and display to each other by stretching their necks upwards, then uttering calls while head-flagging, and then flapping their wings. The displays do not seem directed towards an individual, but occur randomly. These displays stimulate "synchronous nesting" (see below) and help pair up those birds that do not already have mates.

Flamingos form strong pair bonds, although in larger colonies, flamingos sometimes change mates, presumably because more mates are available to choose. Flamingo pairs establish and defend nesting territories. They locate a suitable spot on the mudflat to build a nest (the female usually selects the place). Copulation usually occurs during nest building, which is sometimes interrupted by another flamingo pair trying to commandeer the nesting site for their use. Flamingos aggressively defend their nesting sites. Both the male and the female contribute to building the nest, and to protecting the nest and egg. Same-sex pairs have been reported.

After the chicks hatch, the only parental expense is feeding. Both the male and the female feed their chicks with a kind of crop milk, produced in glands lining the whole of the upper digestive tract (not just the crop). The hormone prolactin stimulates production. Crop milk contains both fat and protein, as with mammalian milk, but unlike mammalian milk, it contains no carbohydrates. (Pigeons and doves also produce crop milk, though just in the glands lining the crop, which contains less fat and more protein than flamingo crop milk.)

For the first six days after the chicks hatch, the adults and chicks stay in the nesting sites. At around 7–12 days old, the chicks begin to move out of their nests and explore their surroundings. When they are two weeks old, the chicks congregate in groups, called "microcrèches", and their parents leave them alone. After a while, the microcrèches merge into "crèches" containing thousands of chicks. Chicks that do not stay in their crèches are vulnerable to predators. When young flamingos are around three to three and a half months old, their flight feathers will finish growing in, allowing them to fly.

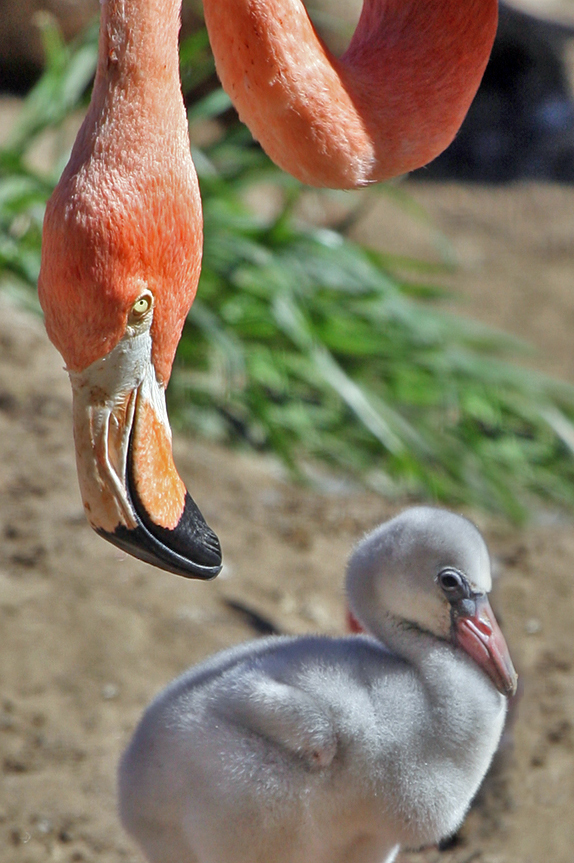
American flamingo and offspring: The arcuate (curved) bill is adapted to bottom scooping.

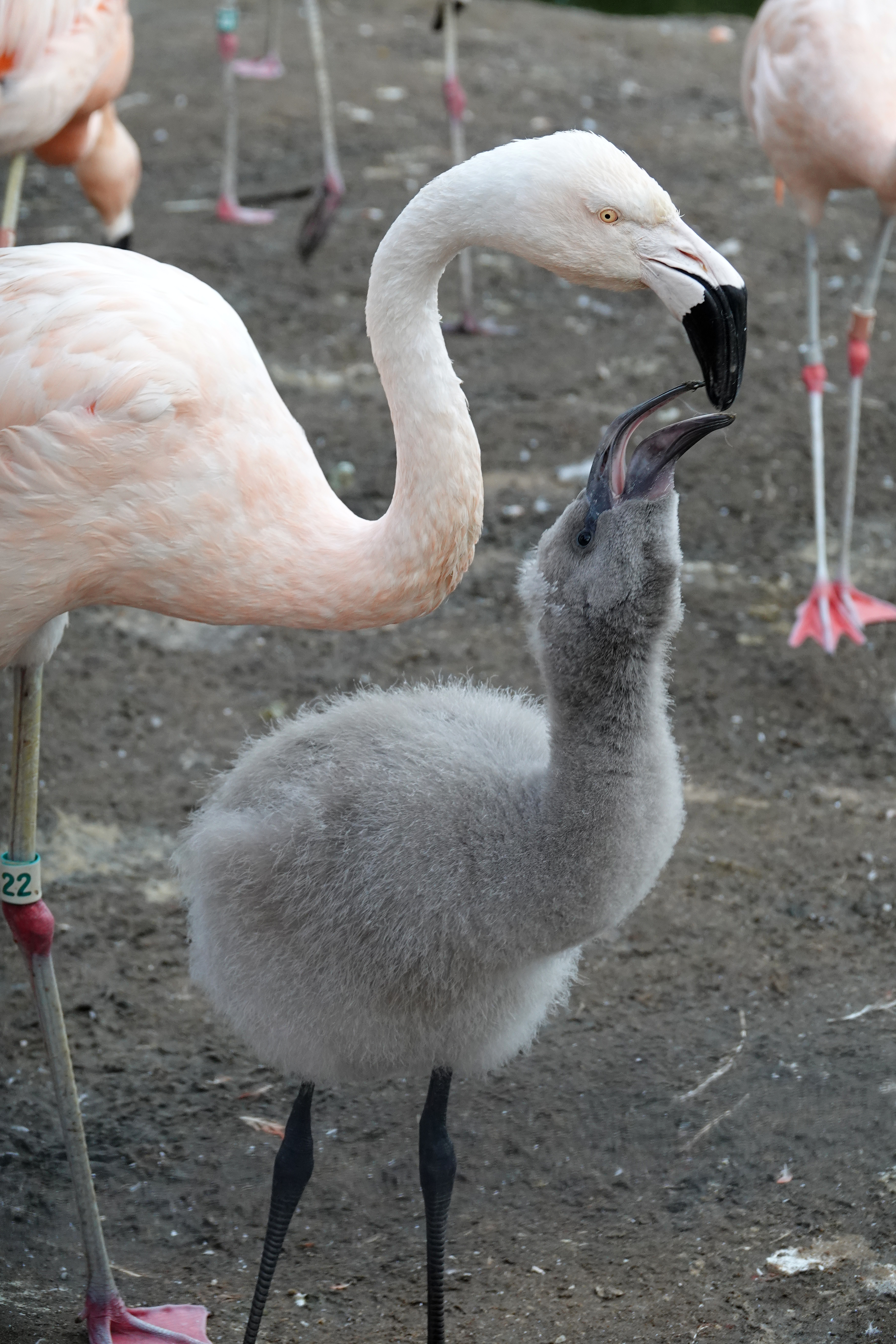
Chilean flamingo feeding its young

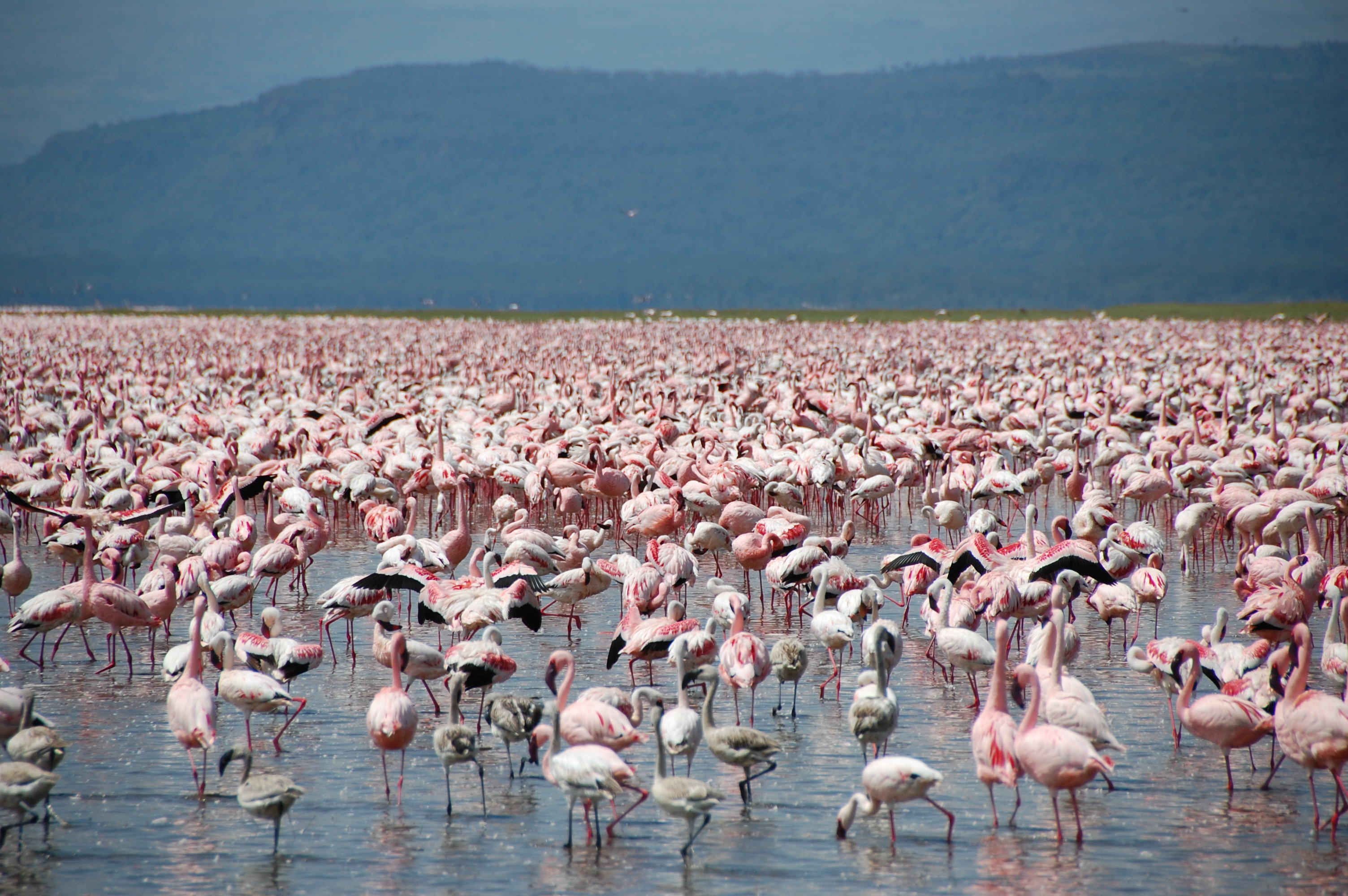
Colony of lesser flamingos at Lake Nakuru

== Status and conservation ==
=== In captivity ===
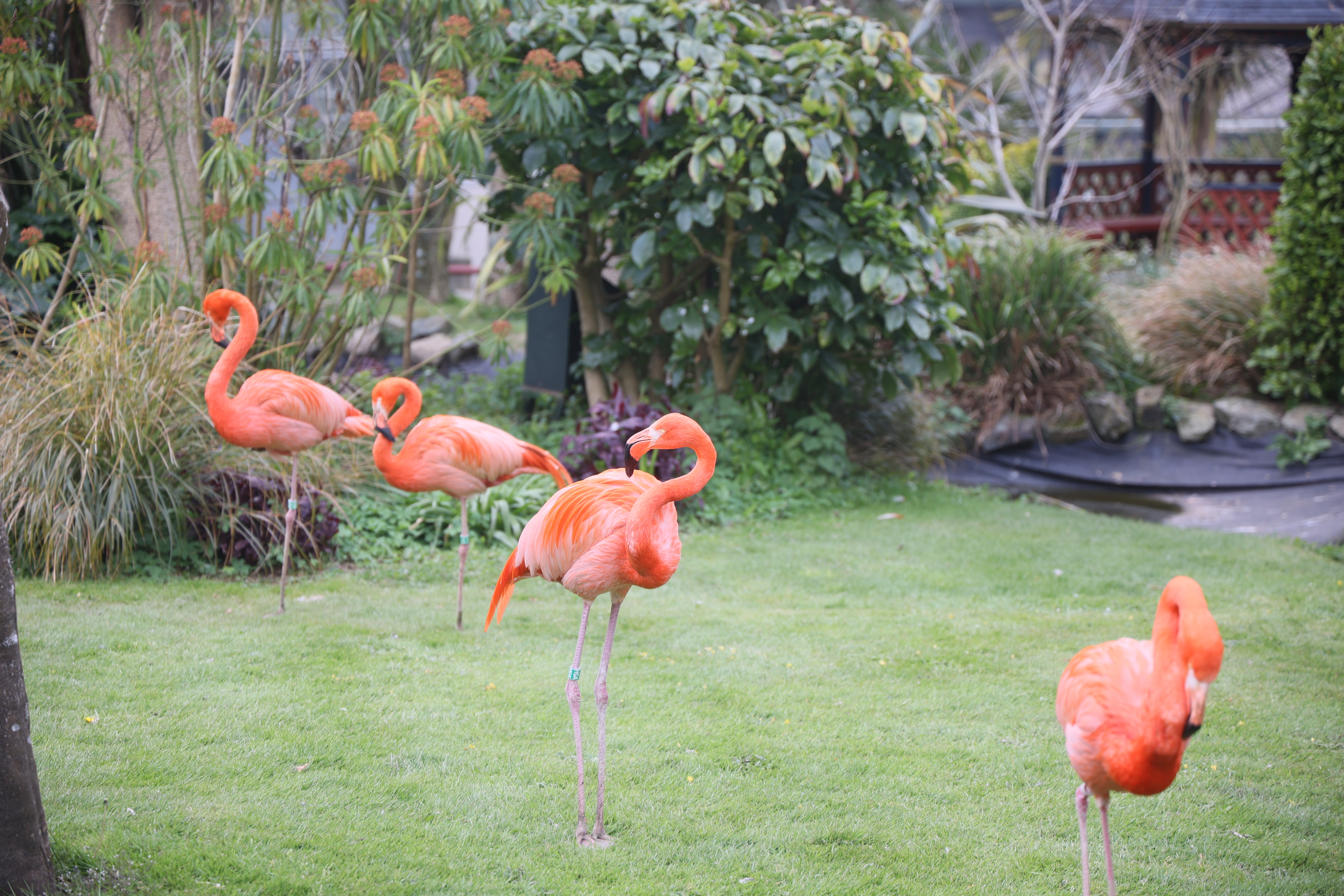
Flamingos at Paradise Park, a zoo in Cornwall

The first flamingo hatched in a European zoo was a Chilean flamingo at Zoo Basel in Switzerland in 1958. Since then, over 389 flamingos have grown up in Basel and been distributed to other zoos around the globe.

Greater, a greater flamingo who was at least 83 years old and believed to be the oldest in the world, died at the Adelaide Zoo in Australia in January 2014.

Zoos have used mirrors to encourage flamingos to breed. The mirrors are thought to give the flamingos the impression that they are in a larger flock than they actually are.

== Relationship with humans ==
=== In ancient Egypt ===
The greater flamingo or Phoenicopterus roseus once thrived in the Nile Delta for a long time in Egypt's history up to the 1900s. It is often seen in pottery during the era of Naqada II, and turned into a hieroglyph, but not as much as other birds; its imagery decreases by the beginning of the early dynastic era.

The Ancient Egyptian god Set is depicted with a flamingo head in the Book of the Faiyum.

=== Ancient Roman cuisine ===
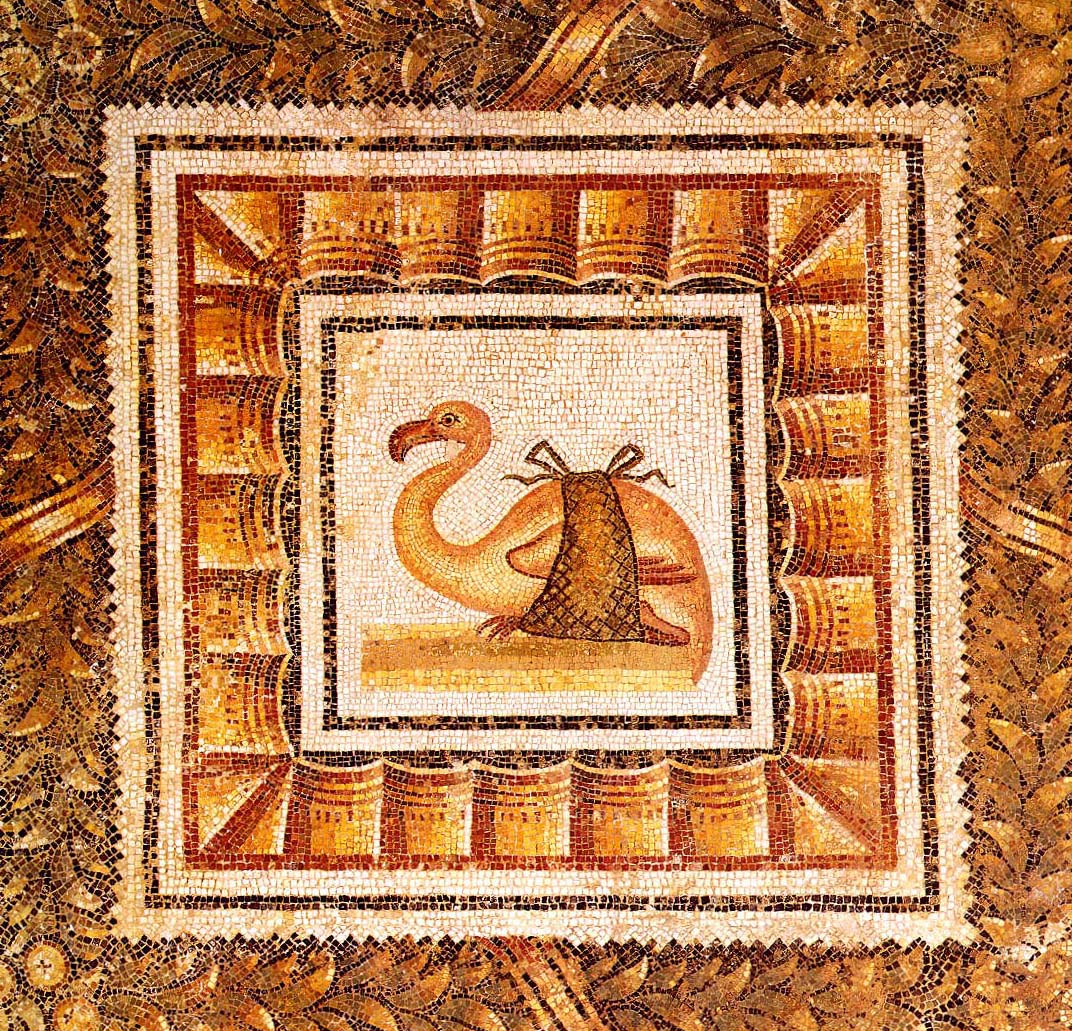
Mosaic of pink flamingo prepared for cooking, in the Bardo Museum.

While many different kinds of birds were valued items in Roman food, flamingos were among the most prized in ancient Roman cuisine. An early reference to their consumption, and especially of their tongues, is found in Pliny the Elder, who states in the Natural History:

phoenicopteri linguam praecipui saporis esse Apicius docuit, nepotum omnium altissimus gurges
(Translated: Apicius, that very deepest whirlpool of all our epicures, has informed us that the tongue of the phœnicopterus is of the most exquisite flavour.)

— Natural History, book X, chapter 67

Although a few recipes for flamingos are found in Apicius' extant works, none refer specifically to flamingo tongues. The three flamingo recipes in the De re coquinaria (On the Subject of Cooking) involve the whole creature:

- 220: roasted with an egg sauce, a recipe for wood pigeons, squabs, fattened fowl; flamingo is an afterthought.
- 230: boiled; parrot may be substituted.
- 231: roasted with a must sauce.

Suetonius mentions flamingo tongues in his Life of Vitellius:

Most notorious of all was the dinner given by his brother to celebrate the emperor's arrival in Rome, at which two thousand of the choicest fishes and seven thousand birds are said to have been served. He himself eclipsed even this at the dedication of a platter, which on account of its enormous size he called the "Shield of Minerva, Defender of the City." In this he mingled the livers of pike, the brains of pheasants and peacocks, the tongues of flamingos and the milt of lampreys, brought by his captains and triremes from the whole empire, from Parthia to the Spanish strait.

— Suetonius, Life of Vitellius

Martial, the poet, devoted an ironic epigram, alluding to flamingo tongues:

Latin:

Dat mihi penna rubens nomen; sed lingua gulosis

Nostra sapit: quid, si garrula lingua foret?

[Translated:] My red wing gives me my name; but it is my tongue that is considered savoury by epicures. What, if my tongue had been able to sing?

— Epigrammata 71, Book 13

There is also a mention of flamingo brains in a later, highly contentious source, detailing, in the life of Elagabalus, a food item not apparently to his liking as much as camels' heels and parrot tongues, in the belief that the latter was a prophylactic:

In imitation of Apicius he frequently ate camels-heels and also cocks-combs taken from the living birds, and the tongues of peacocks and nightingales, because he was told that one who ate them was immune from the plague. He served to the palace-attendants, moreover, huge platters heaped up with the viscera of mullets, and flamingo-brains, partridge-eggs, thrush-brains, and the heads of parrots, pheasants, and peacocks.

=== Other ===
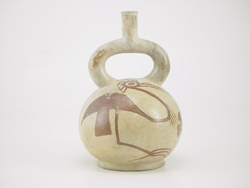
Moche ceramic depicting flamingo (200 AD). Larco Museum, Lima, Peru

- In the Americas, the Moche people of ancient Peru worshipped nature. They placed emphasis on animals, and often depicted flamingos in their art.
- Flamingos are the national bird of the Bahamas.
- Andean miners have killed flamingos for their fat, believing that it would cure tuberculosis.
- In the United States, pink plastic flamingos are sometimes used as lawn ornaments. They were first designed by Don Featherstone in 1957. Their popularity was influenced in part by the prevalence of flamingo souvenirs in Florida along with the Flamingo grand hotel in Miami Beach, prompting the correlation of flamingos with style and wealth.
- In 2026, the flamingo became a symbol of the anti-government protests in Albania known as the Flamingo Revolution.
