= Elornis =

Elornis Temporal range: Late Oligocene

Scientific classification
- Kingdom: Animalia
- Phylum: Chordata
- Class: Aves
- Order: Phoenicopteriformes
- Family: Phoenicopteridae
- Genus: †Elornis; Milne-Edwards, 1868

Type species
- †Elornis littoralis Milne-Edwards, 1868

Species
- †Elornis grandis Milne-Edwards, 1870; †Elornis littoralis Milne-Edwards, 1868

Extinct genus of bird

Elornis is an extinct genus of flamingo from the Late Oligocene of Ronzon, France. Although the name was coined in the 1850s, the name remained a nomen nudum until later publications by French zoologist Henri Milne-Edwards. Elornis has been historically considered to be a member of the Phoenicopteridae, but more recent research suggests it may have been more basal. Research on this taxon is however difficult as the current whereabouts of the fossil material are unknown, limiting data to the description and illustrations of Milne-Edwards.

== History ==
The name Elornis was first coined by Auguste Aymard in a report on the paleontology of the French Haute Loire region, which was presented on two occasions to the Congres Seientifique de France in 1855. In his report, Aymard introduces several names for fossil birds, including Elornis grandis, Elornis (?) littoralis and Elornis (?) antiquus. However, very little information is given in the report, only stating that these birds are flamingos and neither giving a full description nor illustrating the material. This effectively renders the names as coined by Aymard absolute nomina nuda. However, in spite of the names being coined under these circumstances, they found widespread use in subsequent years. Most notable among them was Henri Milne-Edwards, who discussed Elornis while also providing illustrations of the fossil material. Subsequent authors then proceeded to base their own works in regards to Elornis on Milne-Edwards' work, oftentimes without ever reading the paper in which the name was first coined, partially due to the rare nature of the publication. The nomenclature of Elornis was eventually covered in greater detail by Storrs Olson, who wrote that due to Aymard's names being nomina nuda, the status of his taxa was entirely dependent on Milne-Edwards description. Thus, instead of Aymard being credited as the authority behind Elornis, it would have to be Milne-Edwards. Two more problems arose during Olson's research on Elornis however. For one, Milne-Edwards' work was not published in a single publication, but rather over the course of several livraisons leaving a two year gap between the publishing of the Elornis illustrations and the eventual description via text. Furthermore, Aymard's original material was presumed lost, with the descriptions and illustrations given by Milne-Edwards being the only available data.

Elornis littoralis, as described by Milne-Edwards, was based on various postcranial remains including the pelvis, tarsometatarsi, tibiotarsi and furculae. Elornis antiquus was intended to be based on a humerus by Aymard, however this idea was immediately discarded by Milne-Edwards who considered it to be synonymous with E. littoralis. This would make the humerus part of the syntype material and not, as incorrectly suggested by Lydekker and Brodkorb, a lectotype. The material of Elornis grandis received less attention, the humerus Aymard intended as the holotype only mentioned to be "as big as that of a flamingo" by Milne-Edwards and not illustrated at all. Due to the broken up nature of the publication, the illustrations of Elornis littoralis were published before the text description of both E. littoralis and E. grandis. The caption makes note of the name and in the absence of images of E. grandis on the same plate, Elornis littoralis would have to be the type species by monotypy, published several years prior to Elornis grandis. One more species was named by Lydekker in 1891, designated Elornis (?) anglicus. Later research however placed this species in the genus Actiornis and recovered it as an ibis.

== Description ==
The humerus of Elornis littoralis was described as being approximately a quarter smaller than the humerus of a flamingo, while Elornis grandis was described as being of similar size. It is however not specified which species of flamingo is meant.

== Classification ==
Elornis was first recognized as a flamingo by Auguste Aymard when the name was first coined. Milne-Edwards later agreed with the assignment and Olson, although incapable of studying the fossil material itself, concurred with the identification on the basis of the illustrations. Subsequent papers repeat this identification, placing Elornis in the Phoenicopteridae. This is questioned by Mayr, who argues that Elornis would be better placed outside of Phoenicopteridae given the less derived morphology of other Oligocene flamingo relatives.
