= Phoenicopterus stocki =

Phoenicopterus stocki Temporal range: Pliocene

Scientific classification
- Domain: Eukaryota
- Kingdom: Animalia
- Phylum: Chordata
- Class: Aves
- Order: Phoenicopteriformes
- Family: Phoenicopteridae
- Genus: Phoenicopterus
- Species: †P. stocki

Binomial name
- †Phoenicopterus stocki Miller, 1944

Extinct species of flamingo

Phoenicopterus stocki, also known as Stock's flamingo, is an extinct species of flamingo from the Pliocene of Chihuahua, Mexico. It was described in 1944 as a small bodied flamingo species known from assorted fragmentary remains, including bones of the tibia and the wings. The discovery of juvenile remains suggests that the locality where the fossils were found represents a shallow lagoon or mudflat that housed a breeding colony.

== History ==
The remains of Phoenicopterus stocki were discovered in the early 20th century by a field party of the California Institute of Technology led by Chester Stock in the Mexican state of Chihuahua. The field party uncovered nine fragments belong to a species of flamingo later described by Loye H. Miller. The type specimen of this taxon was the distal end of a left tibiotarsus, but additional material from various parts of the body have also been referred to this species. This additional material includes the proximal end of a tibia, possibly belonging to the same individual as the holotype as well as two differently sized humerus fragments. Some of the material is thought to have belonged to juvenile birds not yet capable of flight. All the material initially assigned to the species was uncovered from an area known as Arroyo de los Ponos, also known as CIT locality 289. Additional material would later be collected from the same site as well as the nearby Arroyo de los Burros.

== Description ==
Miller described that Phoenicopterus stocki shares the morphology of extant Phoenicopterus species, but notes that the animal was much smaller, referring to it as a pygmy. The tibiotarsus generally agrees more with the American flamingo in its proportions, being shallower than in the greater flamingo. The intercondylar area is much more narrow than in any extant flamingo and the intercondylar notch, located on the elements distal border, is almost in the center of the condyle which sets it apart from the more recent Phoenicopterus minutus. The fragment of the tibia is described as distinctive by Miller, but is not included in the species diagnosis due to the uncertain relationship between it and the holotype tibiotarsus. The inner articular facet for instance does not extend as far back as in either of the Neotropic Phoenicopterus species, the American and the Chilean flamingo, and instead appears to be closer to the greater flamingo of Africa and Eurasia. In the same fashion the postero-axial border of this facet is shaped almost like the arc of a circle and the posterior notch shallow, both characteristics shared by the greater flamingo but neither of the neotropic species. Although Miller did not have Phoenicoparrus skeletons available for comparison, he compared the Pliocene material to skins of said genus and determined that P. stocki was smaller than either James's flamingo or the Andean flamingo. Related to the tibia, Miller notes that the ratio between its transverse diameter and the sagittal diameter is greater than in the American flamingo but smaller than in Phoenicopterus copei.

Both wing bones collected at the Rincón fossil locality are vastly different in size. While the larger is approximately the size of the same element in the Chilean flamingo, the smaller is outside the range of any adult flamingo known today. Miller places both specimens in P. stocki due to the great variability in leg to wing proportions, specifically citing Chilean flamingos and greater flamingos. Still, the possibility of a second flamingo from the locality is not discarded entirely.

A later publication by Hildegarde Howard also mentioned the small size of Stock's flamingo, writing that the species was small in size, but not as small as Phoenicopterus minutus from the Pleistocene of California.

== Paleobiology ==
Phoenicopterus stocki likely led a similar lifestyle to modern flamingos, wading through water and filtering small organisms using a specially adapted bill. Subsequently, it is inferred that the Rincón locality where the material has been found represents what used to be a shallow lagoon or mudflat during the Pliocene, a conclusion further supported by the presence of not yet volant juveniles. This would mean that flamingos not only fed at the side, but nested and raised their young there as well. Support for this hypothesis is also lend by the other bird remains found there, which generally belong to aquatic species.
