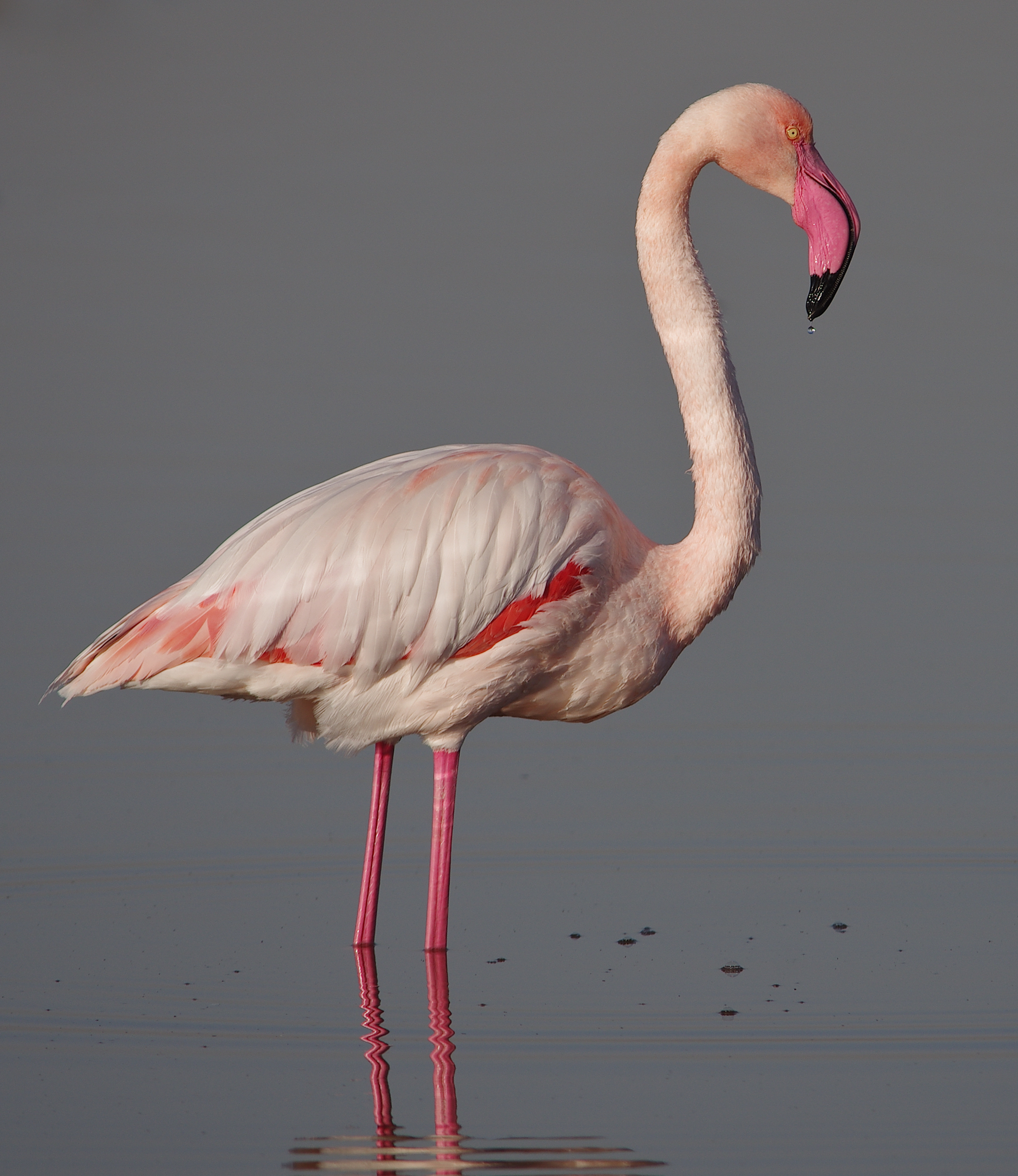
- Greater flamingo (Phoenicopterus roseus)

Scientific classification
- Kingdom: Animalia
- Phylum: Chordata
- Class: Aves
- Order: Phoenicopteriformes
- Family: Phoenicopteridae
- Genus: Phoenicopterus; Linnaeus, 1758

Type species
- Phoenicopterus ruber Linnaeus, 1758

Species
- Phoenicopterus chilensis; Phoenicopterus roseus; Phoenicopterus ruber; †Phoenicopterus copei; †Phoenicopterus floridanus; †Phoenicopterus minutus; †Phoenicopterus novaehollandiae; †Phoenicopterus stocki

= Phoenicopterus =

Genus of birds

Phoenicopterus is a genus of birds in the flamingo family Phoenicopteridae.

== Taxonomy ==
The genus Phoenicopterus was introduced in 1758 by the Swedish naturalist Carl Linnaeus in the tenth edition of his Systema Naturae to accommodate a single species, the American flamingo Phoenicopterus ruber. The genus name comes from Ancient Greek φοῖνιξ (phoînix), meaning "crimson", and πτερόν (pterón), meaning "feather".

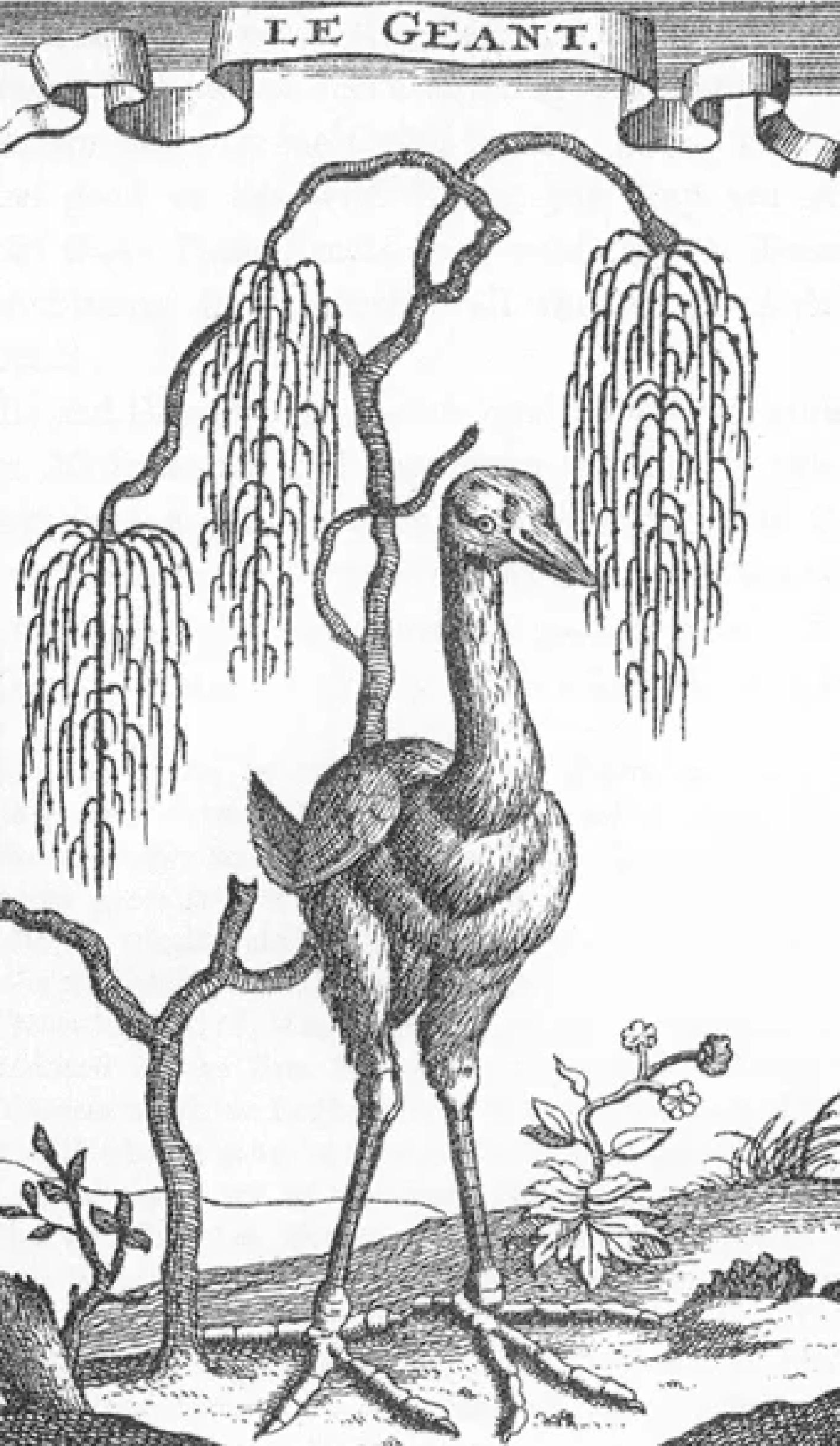
Illustration of "Leguat's giant", a bird from Mauritius now believed by some researchers to be based on sightings of the greater flamingo

A large bird described from Mauritius and Rodrigues and illustrated by the traveller Francois Leguat in 1708 was speculated to represent a large rail by Hermann Schlegel in 1857 and named Leguatia gigantea, "Leguat's giant", but later research indicates that it was probably based on sightings of Phoenicopterus flamingos that are known to have lived there, possibly the greater flamingo.

=== Species ===
The genus contains three extant species:

Genus Phoenicopterus – Linnaeus, 1758 – three species
Common name	Scientific name and subspecies	Range	Size and ecology	IUCN status and estimated population
Greater flamingo	Phoenicopterus roseus Pallas, 1811	widespread in Africa and southwest, south-central Eurasia	Size: Habitat: Diet:	LC
American flamingo	Phoenicopterus ruber Linnaeus, 1758	northern Galápagos Islands and the Caribbean	Size: Habitat: Diet:	LC
Chilean flamingo	Phoenicopterus chilensis Molina, 1782	central Peru to Tierra del Fuego east to south Brazil, Uruguay and central Argentina	Size: Habitat: Diet:	NT
