= Phoeniconotius =

Phoeniconotius Temporal range: Late Oligocene–Early Miocene

Scientific classification
- Domain: Eukaryota
- Kingdom: Animalia
- Phylum: Chordata
- Class: Aves
- Order: Phoenicopteriformes
- Family: Phoenicopteridae
- Genus: †Phoeniconotius; Miller, 1963
- Species: †P. eyrensis

Binomial name
- †Phoeniconotius eyrensis Miller, 1963

Extinct genus of birds

Phoeniconotius is an extinct genus of flamingo that lived in Australia from the late Oligocene to the early Miocene. Unlike modern flamingos and the contemporary Phoenicopterus novaehollandiae, it was likely less well adapted for swimming and deep water wading. Phoeniconotius was a robust flamingo with bones more massive than those of the modern greater flamingo. Only a single species is recognized, Phoeniconotius eyrensis.

== History ==
The fossils of Phoeniconotius have been discovered in the Lake Eyre basin of Australia, specifically a layer of mudstone belonging to the Etadunna Formation on the western shore of Lake Palankarinna. The type material consists of three bones, the distal end of the left tarsometatarsus and two phalanges. The material was collected from the surface and were discovered in association with one another, however not articulated. One phalanx, which is thought to represent the third toe, matches well with the corresponding area on the tarsometatarsus while the second known toe bone, likely representing the fourth toe, is thought to stem from the animal's right side. All the material is equally mineralized and shows the same coloration.

== Description ==
The Phoeniconotius material generally resembles that of modern flamingos. Where the third trochlea connects with the third toe, the bone is truncated rather than elongated as in modern species and the second trochlea has a broad, rounded concavity bodering the articular surface. Like in extant taxa, the second trochlea is elevated and deflects towards the plantar surface. The third trochlea is also more robust and wider than in extant flamingos and is more similar to the massiveness observed in the Palaelodidae, the sister family to the Phoenicopteridae. However, despite this similarity in robustness, Miller rejects a closer relationship between the two. Much like Phoenicopterus novaehollandiae, there is a clear scar for the attachment of the first metatarsal. This clearly separates Phoeniconotius from today's flamingos, in which the hallux is either reduced past the point of leaving visible attachment points on the tarsometatarsus or missing entirely. The third phalanx of Phoeniconotius, which would form the base of the second toe, is short and robust. Both in breadth and depth the foot of Phoeniconotius exceeds that of the largest male greater flamingo sampled by the paper. This could suggest that Phoeniconotius was a rather large member of its family, however due to the absence of the shaft of the tarsometatarsus nothing precise can be said about its limb proportions.

== Paleobiology ==
Unlike the contemporary Phoenicopterus novaehollandiae, Phoeniconotius appears to differ somewhat from the lifestyle of modern flamingos. Miller argues that the anatomy of the foot is poorly suited for swimming or deep water wading. In modern swimming birds, the plantar surface of the foot is built to allow for greater extension, while the foot of Phoeniconotius is built more like that of a terrestrial wader akin to a crane. This is further supported by the robust phalanges and the seemingly well developed first toe, which is reduced in flamingos but well developed in less aquatic wading birds like storks and cranes.
