= Phoenicopterus copei =

Phoenicopterus copei Temporal range: Late Pleistocene

Scientific classification
- Kingdom: Animalia
- Phylum: Chordata
- Class: Aves
- Order: Phoenicopteriformes
- Family: Phoenicopteridae
- Genus: Phoenicopterus
- Species: P. copei

Binomial name
- Phoenicopterus copei Shufeldt, 1891

Extinct species of bird

Phoenicopterus copei is an extinct species of flamingo that inhabited North America during the Late Pleistocene. Its fossils have been discovered in Oregon, California, Mexico and Florida. Many of these localities preserve the remains of juvenile individuals, indicating that this species nested at the lakes found there. In some areas like California and Florida it coexisted with smaller flamingo species. P. copei was a large species of Phoenicopterus, described as being greater in size than modern American flamingos.

== History ==
Although multiple flamingo species are known from North America today, Phoenicopterus copei was the first fossil taxon of this family described. The species was erected by Robert Wilson Shufeldt in 1891 based on remains discovered at Fossil Lake, Oregon. In 1955 Hildegarde Howard described the remains of two differently sized flamingos from Lake Manix in California, assigning the smaller remains to a new species and the larger to Phoenicopterus copei. However this assignment is only tentative, primarily based on the fact that the Lake Manix tarsometatarsus is visibly broadened similar to the Fossil Lake tibiotarsus. Howard reasons that the width of these elements matching could suggest that they belonged to the same species, seeing as the two bones would articulate with one another in life. Remains of a juvenile specimen were later also identified from the Chimalhuacan locality at Lake Texcoco, approximately 20 km (12 mi) east of the Zócalo. The range of P. copei was again expanded in 1995, when Steven D. Emslie reported bones assigned to the species from the Irvingtonian Leisy Shell Pit in Hillsborough County, Florida. This marked the first record of the species from the eastern United States and the earliest appearance of it in the fossil record.

== Description ==
Shufeldt described Phoenicopterus copei as having both longer legs as well as longer wings than the modern American flamingo. The tibiotarsus has a distal end recognized for being broader than in either the American or greater flamingo, with wide spaces between the individual condyles. This matches the anatomy of the intercotylar tubercle as seen in the Lake Manix specimen, which shows that that element is high and pointed like in the American flamingo, but also broadened to accommodate the more widely spaced condyles. The species appears to have been among the larger known flamingos, as Howard describes the remains of a juvenile bird from Lake Manix as being within the size range of modern American and greater flamingos, specifically noting that this does not represent the size obtained by a mature animal. This is further supported by Emslie, who describes P. copei as being larger than the American flamingo.

== Paleobiology ==
The presence of juvenile flamingo fossils indicate that Phoenicopterus copei nested and raised its young in many of the localities it had been found in, which includes Lake Texcoco in Mexico as well as Fossil Lake in Oregon and Lake Manix in California. This indicates that Phoenicopterus copei was a widespread genus with a significant breeding range, which may also include Hillsborough County, San Marcos and Chapala based on the discovery of fragmentary remains from these regions. This would match well with the preferred habitat of modern flamingos, which are found to inhabit shallow lakes that allow them to build cone-like nests from mud and offer microorganisms as a food source, which they filter from the mud and water. In some parts of its range, P. copei would have coexisted with other flamingo species. Namely with Phoenicopterus minutus at Lake Manix and the American flamingo in Florida. In both these instances, P. copei would have been the larger taxon.
