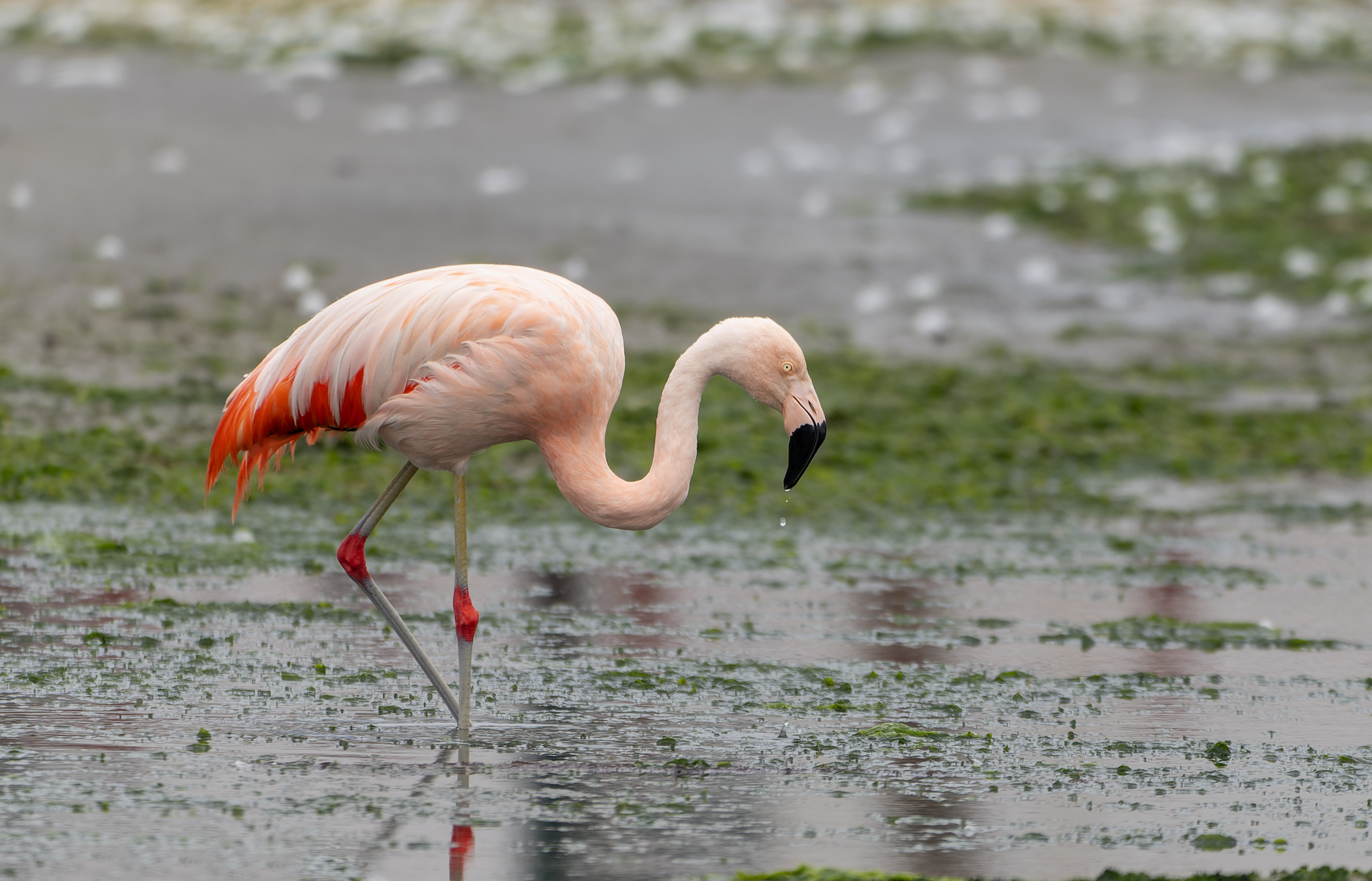
- In Peru

Conservation status
- Near Threatened (IUCN 3.1)
- CITES Appendix II

Scientific classification
- Kingdom: Animalia
- Phylum: Chordata
- Class: Aves
- Order: Phoenicopteriformes
- Family: Phoenicopteridae
- Genus: Phoenicopterus
- Species: P. chilensis

Binomial name
- Phoenicopterus chilensis Molina, 1782

Synonyms
- Phoenicoparrus chilensis (Molina 1782); Phoenicopterus ruber chilensis (Molina 1782); Phoenicopterus ignipalliatus Orbigny & Geoffroy Saint-Hilaire

= Chilean flamingo =

Species of flamingo

The Chilean flamingo (Phoenicopterus chilensis) is a species of large flamingo at a height of 110–130 cm (43–51 in) closely related to the American flamingo and the greater flamingo, with which it was previously considered a subspecies before being classified as its own species as a result of their lighter color, smaller size and behavioral differences. The species is listed as Near Threatened on the IUCN Red List.

The species breeds in South America from Ecuador and Peru to Chile and Argentina and east to Brazil. Like all flamingos, it lays a single chalky-white egg on a mud mound.

These flamingos are mainly restricted to salt lagoons and soda lakes that are vulnerable to habitat loss and water pollution, especially from mining and irrigation which can cause rapid habitat degradation.

== Description ==
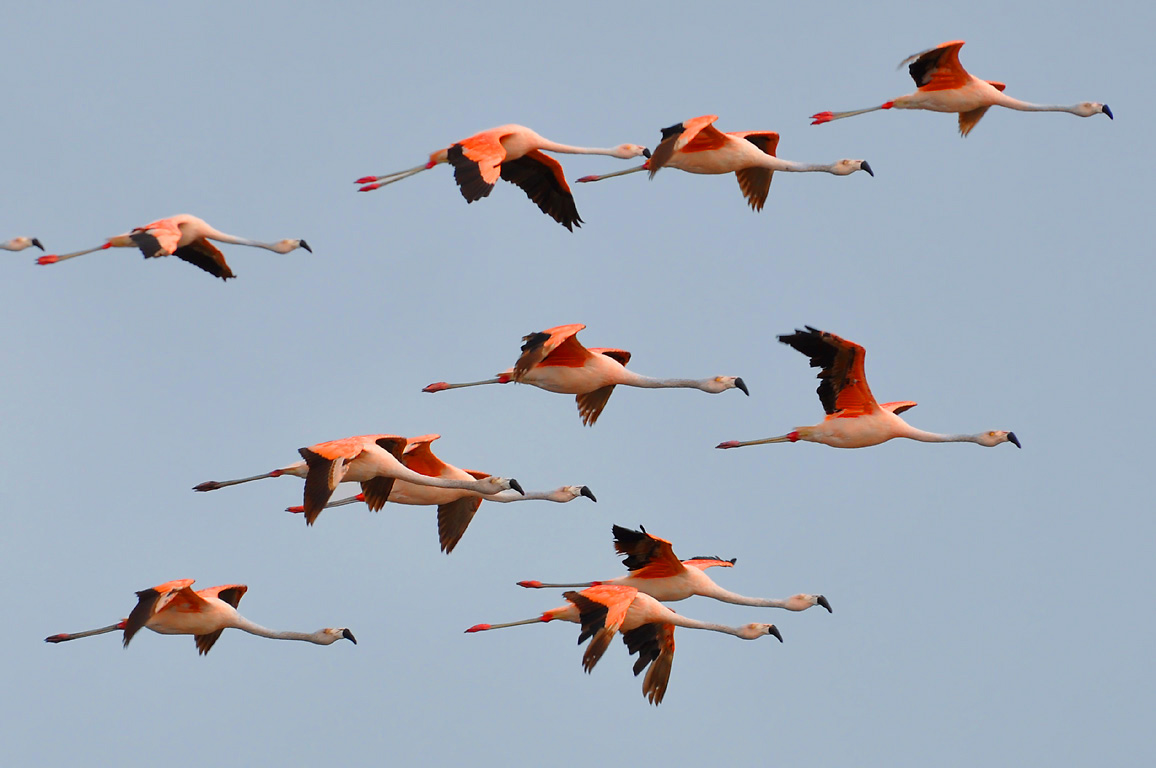
Flock flying in Rio Grande do Sul, Brazil

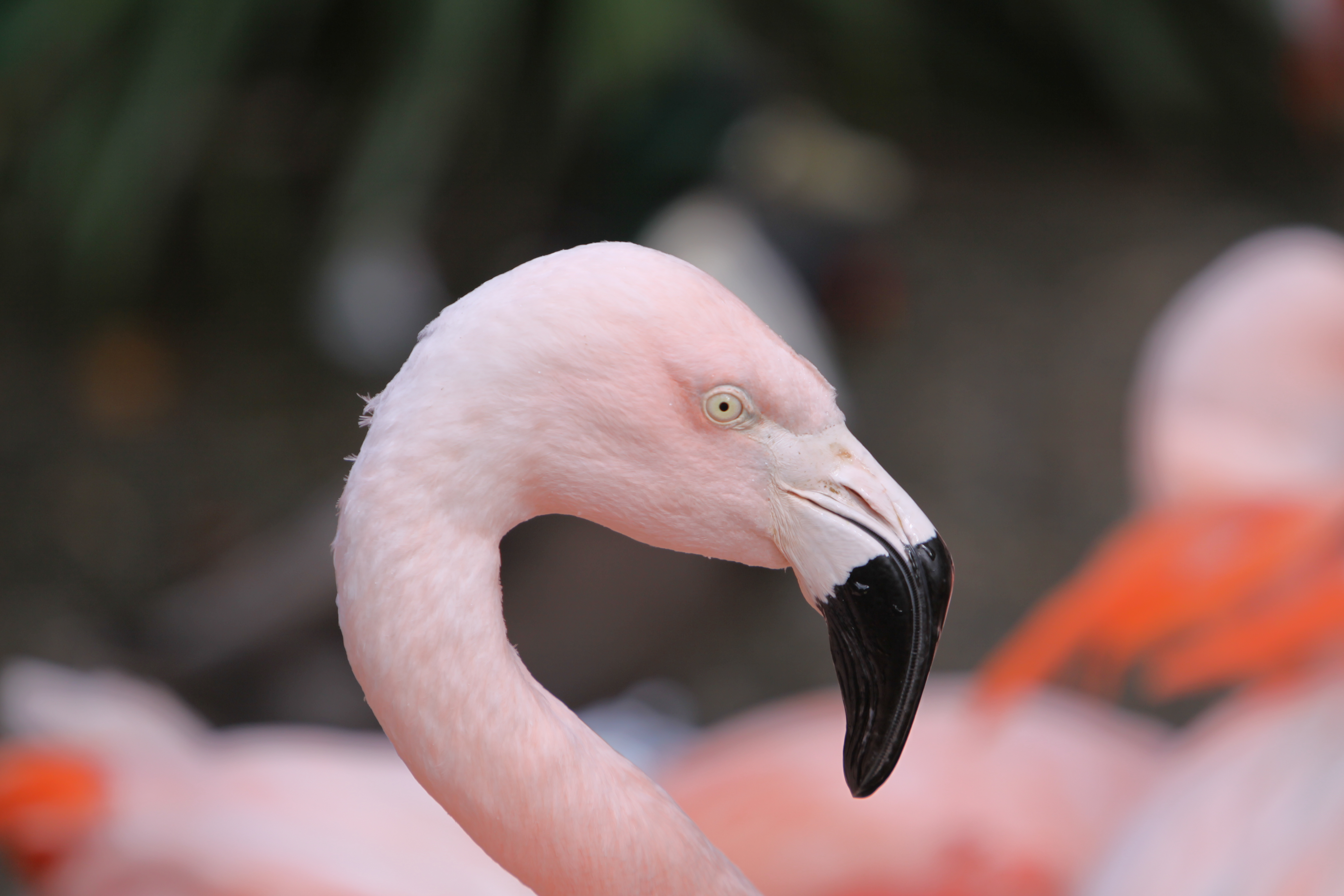
Head of a Chilean flamingo at Durrell Wildlife Park (Jersey)

The Chilean flamingo's plumage is pinker than the slightly larger greater flamingo, but less so than the American flamingo. It can be differentiated from these species by its grayish legs with pink joints, by the larger amount of black on the bill (more than half), and also by being a foot shorter than the American flamingo. Young chicks may have no sign of pink coloring whatsoever, but instead remain gray or peach. Young chicks will slowly gain their pink color as pigments called carotenoids from their diet accumulate in their feathers. Chilean flamingos reach sexual maturity at 6 years and have one of the longest lifespans of any bird, living up to 50 years in the wild and up to 40 years in captivity.

== Diet ==
The Chilean flamingo's bill is equipped with comb-like structures that enable it to filter food—mainly algae, plankton, crustaceans, insects, mollusks and other invertebrates—from the water of the coastal mudflats, estuaries, lagoons, and salt lakes where it lives. The species filter feeds with its head upside down in shallow water. The flamingo then uses its muscular tongues to push water in and out of the lamellae on its bill. This allows the flamingo to filter different sizes of food to consume. Because the species feeds upside down, only the flamingo's upper bill can move as opposed to most animals that can only move their lower mandible. Chilean Flamingoes can consume 10% of their body weight every day. The species has been known to stand on one leg while feeding in water. Strong evidence suggests this behavior limits heat loss from standing in water for extended periods of time. Their long legs also help stir up the sediment to dislodge the small organisms they filter feed on.

== Behavior ==
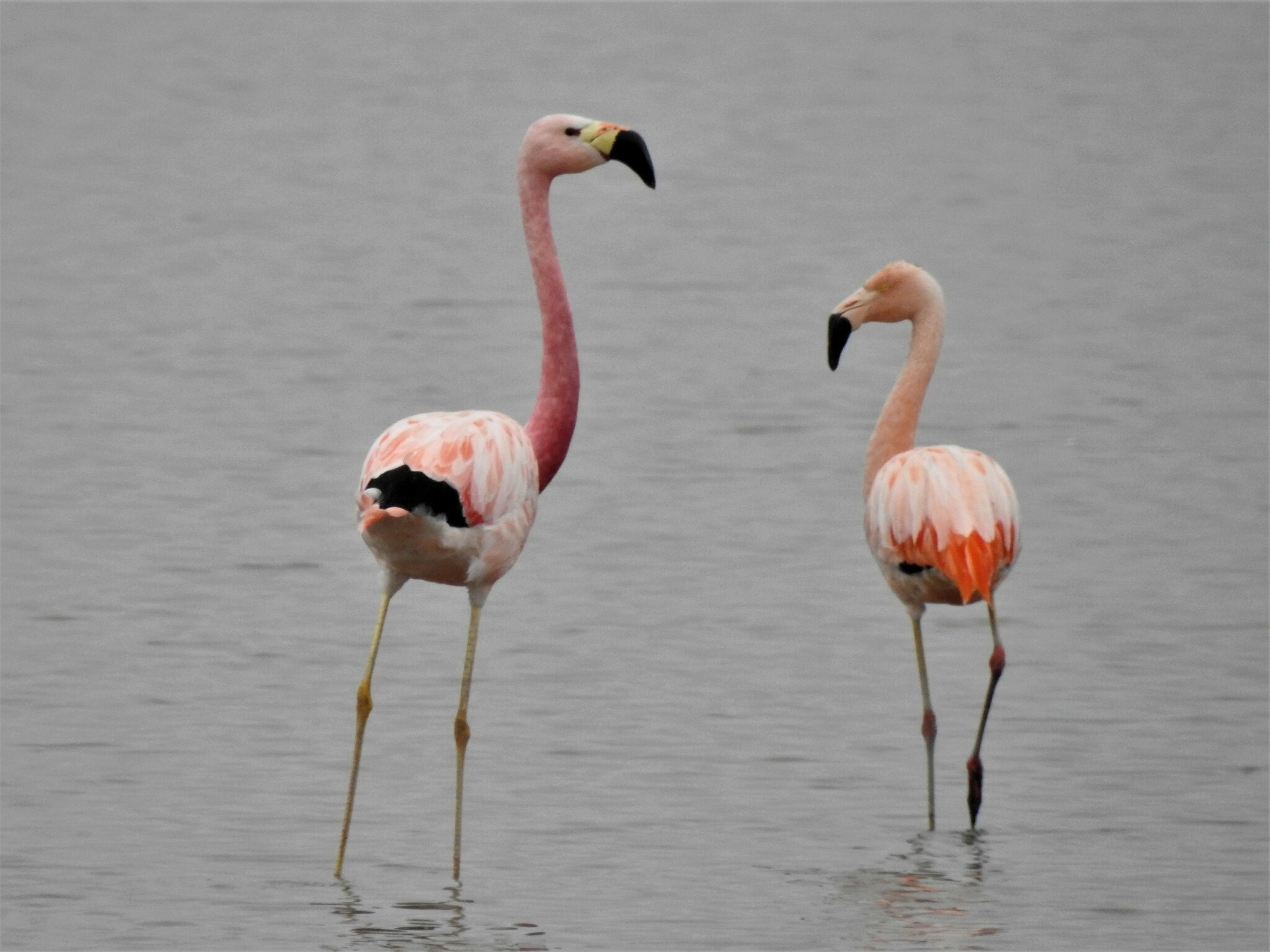
Andean flamingo (left) and Chilean flamingo (right), in Santa Fe, Argentina

Chilean flamingos are social birds which frequently communicate and live together in flocks that can reach tens of thousands of individuals. The flamingos communicate through vocalizations and body movements. Vocalizations are used for mid-flight communication and include honking, grunting, or howling goose-like calls. Each flamingo has a unique call and a flamingo can recognize the call of its offspring among thousands of other flamingos. Chilean flamingos can also communicate using preening behavior. Each flamingo spends between 3.5 and 7 hours a day preening their feathers to keep them waterproof and capable of flight.

== Breeding ==
Chilean flamingos live in large flocks in the wild and require crowded conditions to stimulate breeding. During breeding season, males and females display a variety of behavior to attract mates, including head flagging—swiveling their heads from side-to-side in tandem—and wing salutes, where the wings are repeatedly opened and closed. Flamingos in general have a poor record of successful breeding because they will delay reproduction until the environmental conditions are favorable for breeding.

Males and females co-operate in building a pillar-shaped mud nest, and both incubate the egg laid by the female, taking turns to sit on the egg. Upon hatching, the chicks have gray plumage; they do not gain the typical pink adult coloration for 2–3 years. Both male and female flamingos can produce a nutritious fluid from glands in their crop to feed their young. Due to their diet, this crop milk is crimson in color.

== Conservation ==
The greatest factor threatening Chilean flamingo populations is habitat disturbance. Mining and irrigation greatly affect Chilean flamingo habitat. Egg collectors and hunters also threaten Chilean flamingo populations. Chilean flamingo populations are significantly affected by any human disturbance due to their low birth rate.

== In captivity ==
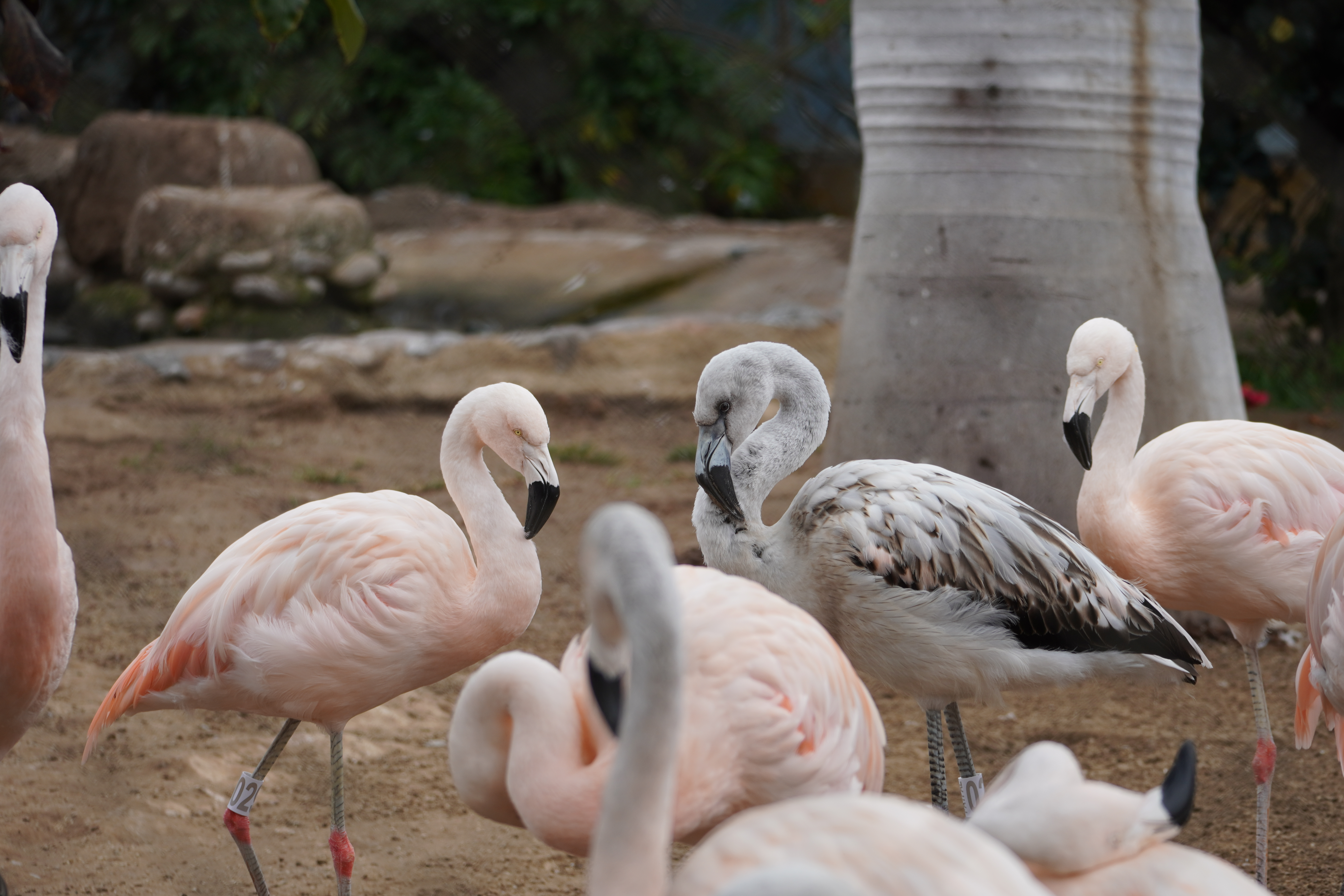
In captivity at Parque de las Leyendas in Peru, including captive bred fledglings

The first flamingo hatched in a European zoo was a Chilean flamingo at Zoo Basel (Switzerland) in 1958.

In 1988, a Chilean flamingo that lived in the Tracy Aviary in Salt Lake City, Utah, had mistakenly not received his routine wing clipping. The flamingo escaped, and became known in the Salt Lake area as Pink Floyd the Flamingo. Pink Floyd came to Utah in winter to eat the brine shrimp that live in the Great Salt Lake, and flew north to Idaho and Montana in the spring and summer. Pink Floyd became a popular attraction until his presumed death after he flew north to Idaho in the spring of 2005 and was never seen again.

Since there is such a decline in the numbers of this species, breeding programs have been implemented in zoos to offset the decline of the wild stock numbers.

A small feral population, derived from birds escaped from zoos, breeds alongside some also-escaped greater flamingos at Zwillbrocker Venn in western Germany, close to the border with the Netherlands.

== Gallery ==
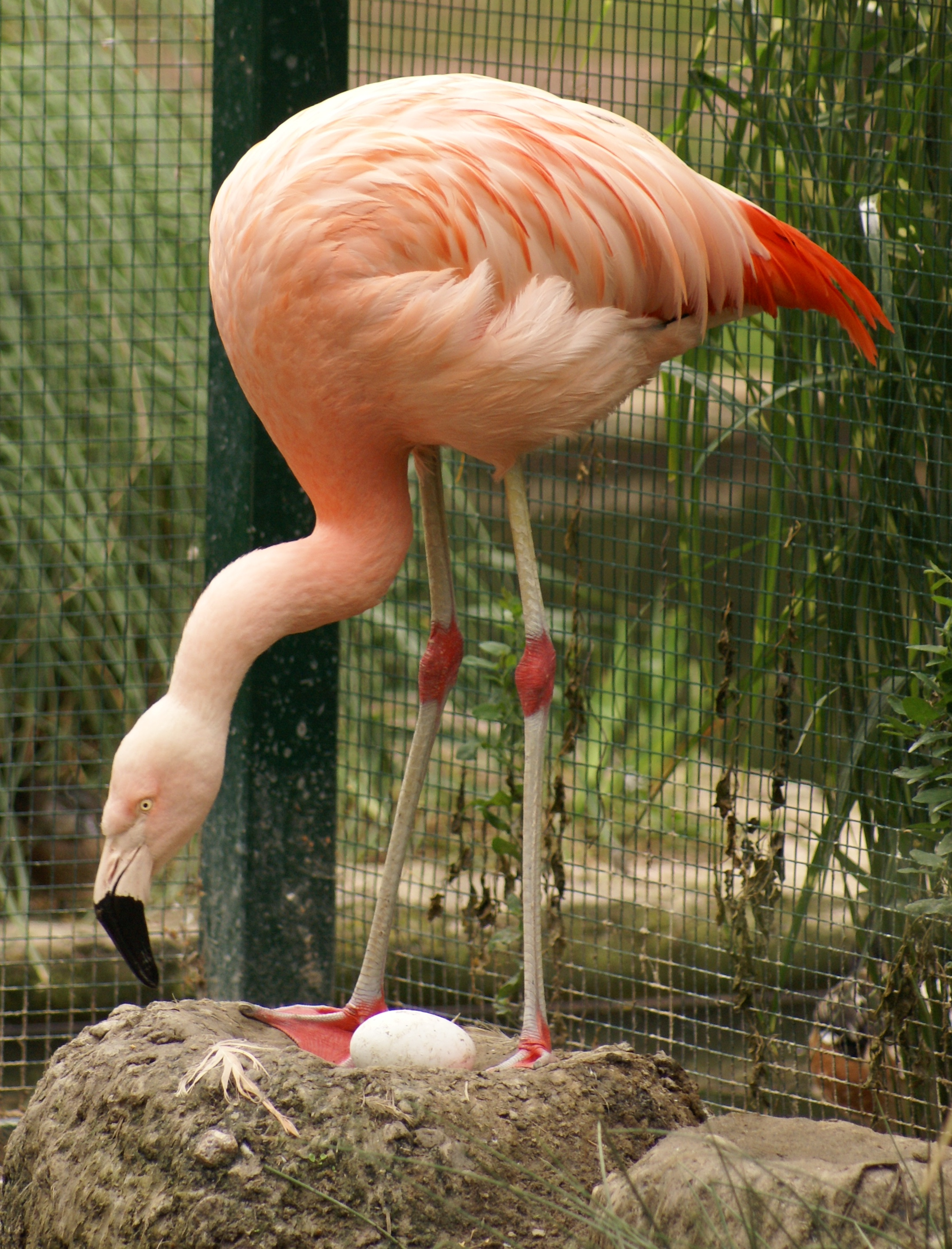
With egg at the Tiergarten in Bernburg, Germany

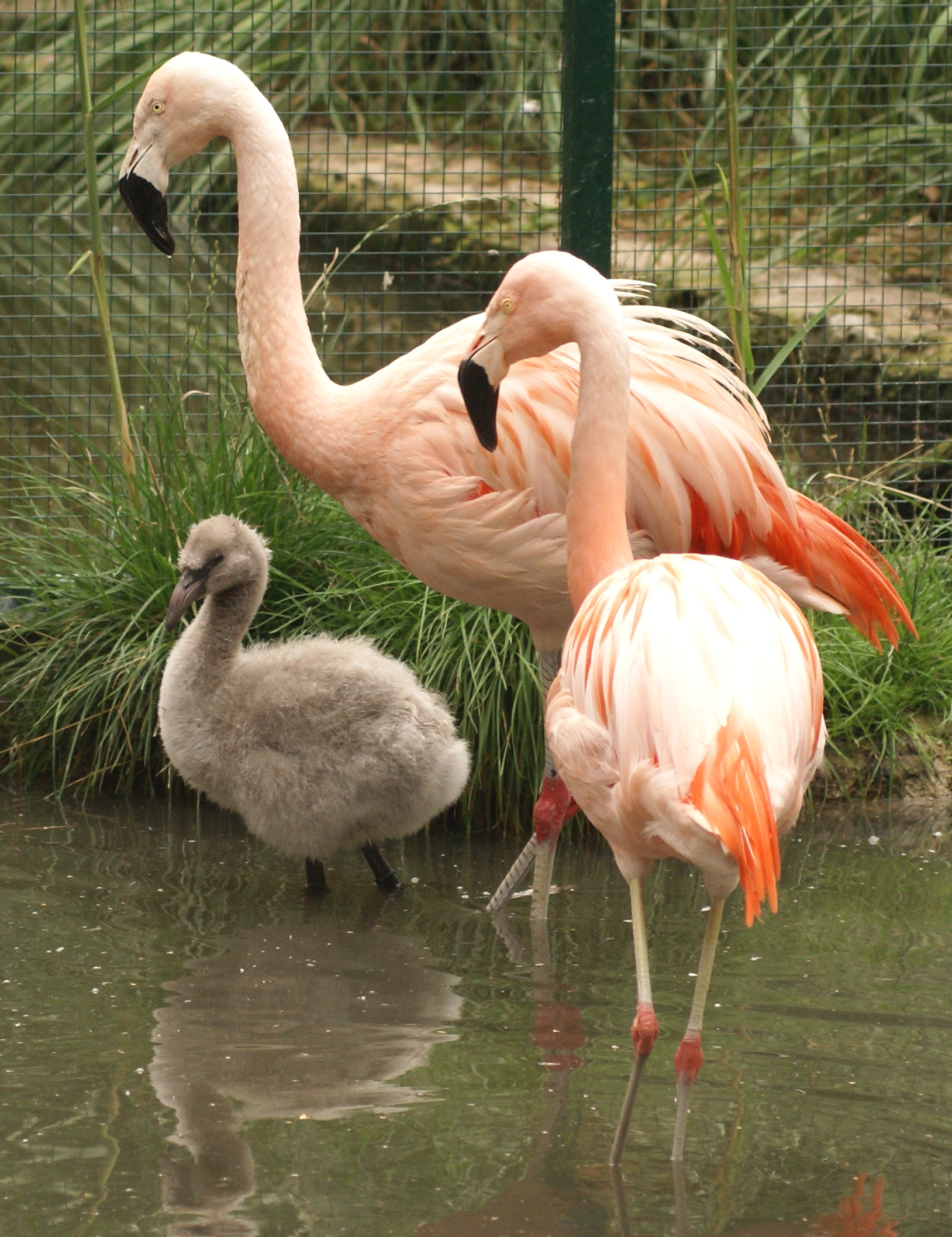
With juvenile at the Tiergarten in Bernburg, Germany

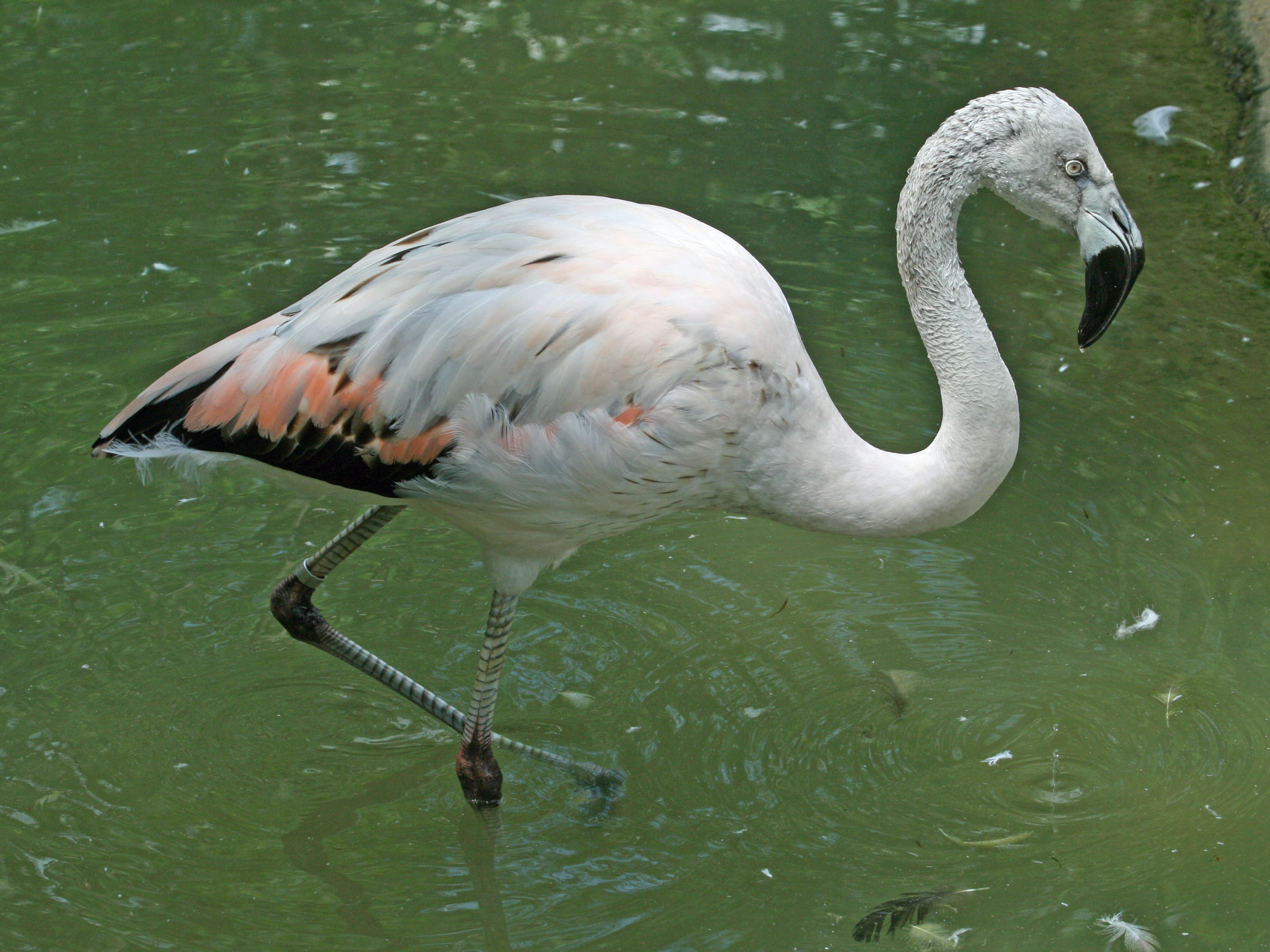
Juvenile at Sylvan Heights Waterfowl Park, North Carolina
