= Air sac =

Part of the respiratory system of birds

Air sacs are spaces within an organism where there is the constant presence of air. Among modern animals, birds possess the most air sacs (9–11), with their extinct dinosaurian relatives showing a great increase in the pneumatization (presence of air) in their bones. Birds use air sacs for respiration as well as a number of other things. Theropods, like Aerosteon, have many air sacs in the body that are not just in bones, and they can be identified as the more primitive form of modern bird airways. Sauropods are well known for the large number of air pockets in their bones (especially vertebra), although one theropod, Deinocheirus, shows a rivalling number of air pockets.

== Air sacs in birds ==
=== Air sacs in respiration ===
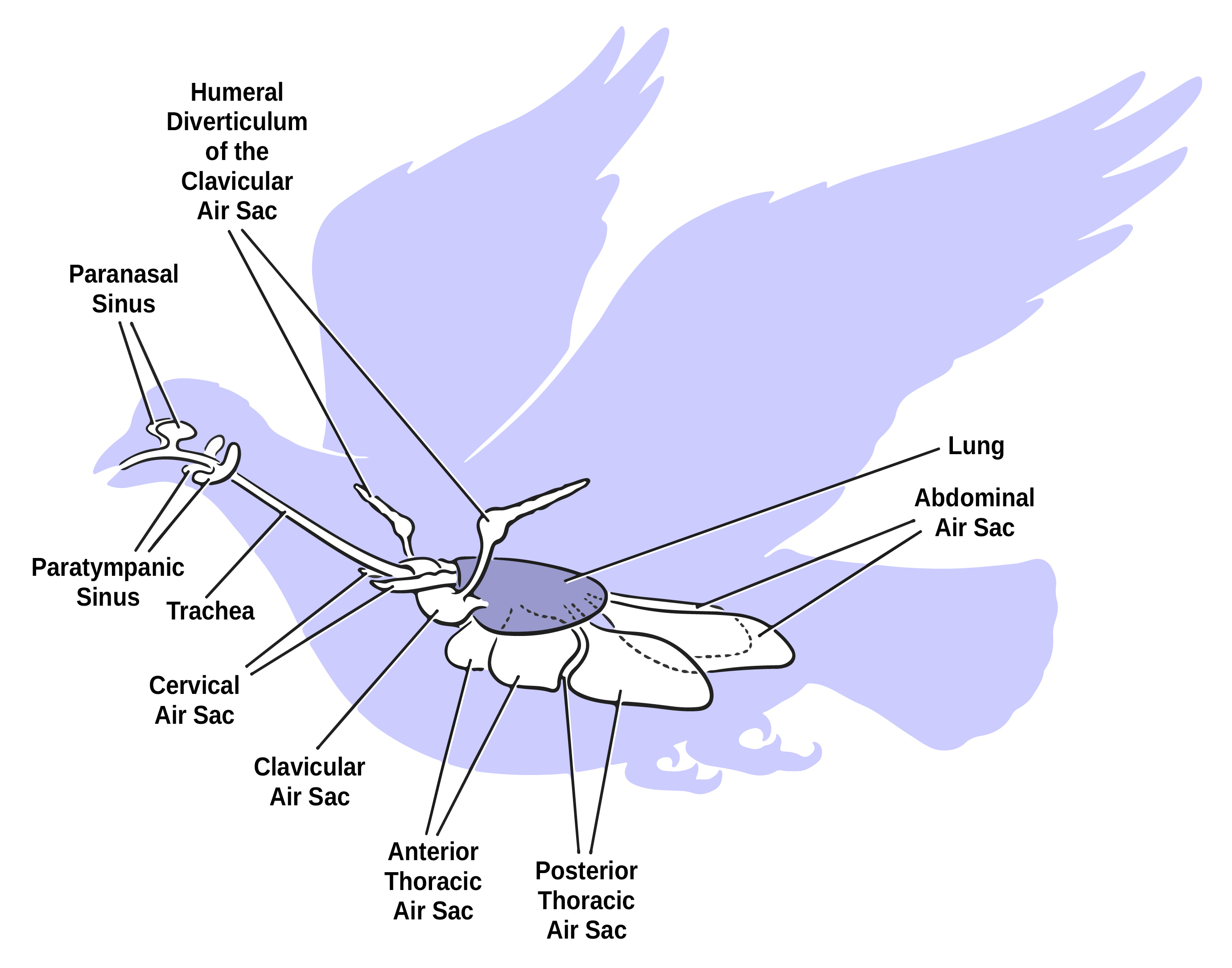
Diagram showing the general layout of air sacs in a bird

Birds have a system of air sacs in their ventilation system. The air sacs work to produce a unidirectional flow where air enters and exits the lung at the same rate, contrasting the lungs of other tetrapods such as mammals where air enters and exits the lung in a tidal ventilation.

Avian lungs have a bronchial system in which the air flows through dorsobronchi into the parabronchi before exiting via the ventrobronchi. Gas exchange occurs at the parabronchi.

Avian pulmonary air sacs are lined with simple epithelial and secretory cells supported by elastin connective tissues. The air sacs themselves are either poorly vascularized or entirely avascular. No gas exchange occurs within them. There are five main air sacs in birds, three of which branch from the ventrobronchi, and two of which branch from the intrapulmonary bronchus connecting the dorsobronchi and ventrobronchi. The air sacs are usually paired, except for the clavicular air sac, creating a total of 9 air sacs. However, this morphology varies among bird species. Birds such as parrots have different air sac arrangements with partial fusion of the cervical air sacs, as well as connection between the clavicular and cranial thoracic air sacs. The morphologies of the individual air sacs also vary among bird taxa.

In birds, gas exchange and volume change do not occur in the same place. While gas exchange occurs in the parabronchi in the lungs, the lungs do not change volume much during respiration. Instead, voluminous expansion occurs in the air sacs. These volume changes cause pressure gradients between air sacs, with higher gradients causing more air to flow over the parabronchi during inhalation and lower gradients causing more air to flow over the parabronchi during exhalation. Different air sacs alternate contraction and expansion, causing air motion, the fundamental mechanism of avian respiration. The compliance of the air sacs is related to the timing of all of the moving parts involved in respiration.

Birds have hollow pneumatic bones. The hollow air spaces in bird bones outside of the head are connected to the air sacs in a way that a bird with a blocked windpipe and a bone broken in a manner where the inside of the bone was connected to the outside world could still breathe. These pneumatic bones are less vascularized than non-pneumatic bones and many pneumatic bones have pneumatic foramina (openings for air passage). Skeletal pneumaticity often originates developmentally as offshoots of the air sacs, especially in the synsacrum. Bone pneumaticity is generally found in the appendicular skeleton. Some birds, such as penguins or loons, have solid bones.

=== Other uses for air sacs ===
==== Water loss ====
In birds, some temperature control occurs in the respiratory system. Water vapor heats cool air during inhalation in the trachea, and increases its humidity. The resulting evaporative water loss varies greatly and depends on several factors including air sac pressure and the subsequent rate of air flow through the trachea.

==== Diving ====
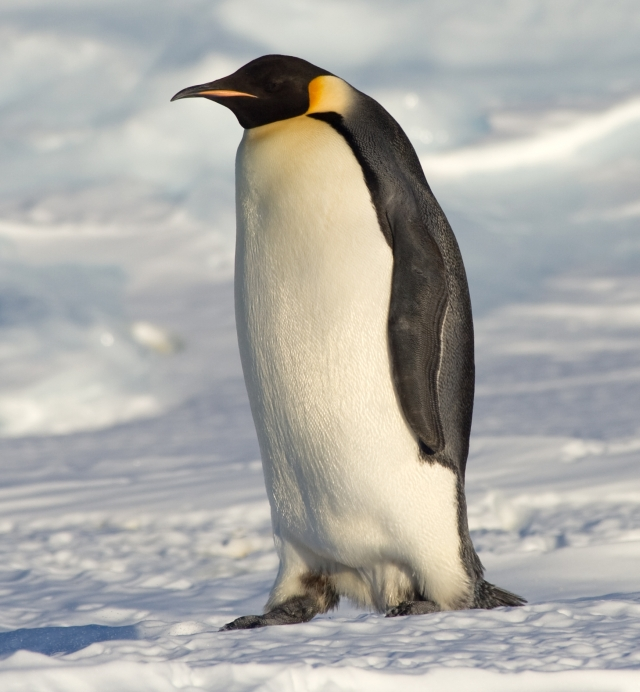
An emperor penguin, an example of a diving bird

In diving birds, the air sacs can aid in helping birds with respiration. Movement of the muscles involved in diving can cause a pressure differential between the air sacs which would cause more air to move through the parabronchi. This would then increase the uptake of oxygen stored in the respiratory system. In penguins, air sac volumes are constricted in deep dives to protect from the effects of water pressure. Penguins have been found inflating their air sacs before dives and exhale much of the air during the deepest point of their dives to change buoyancy while descending and ascending during the dive.

==== Song production ====
Air sacs play a role in song production in songbirds and related birds, with some studies hypothesizing that the air sac may be involved as a resonating chamber. The pressure of air in the air sac is also heavily involved in song production, as different males singing the same song have similar modulations in air sac pressure. Changes in air pressure patterns are indicative of respiratory muscle activity and the airflow around the syrinx, the primary vocalization organ of songbirds. The portion of the neural pathways which control respiration during vocalization changes air sac pressure to control vocal intensity. The pressure in the interclavicular air sac is highly correlated with the fundamental frequency of birdsong in doves. Birdsong primarily occurs in expiration and therefore syllables and fundamental frequency are highly correlated with increased interclavicular air sac pressure. Changes in air sac pressure also affect the length of the trachea which can also affect the fundamental frequency. The pressure can change midpoint of the folds of the syrinx, an action which converts the higher pressure into higher frequencies. In a species of tyrannid (the sister group to true songbirds), birds have two different sources of sound around the trachea. At high air sac pressures, the two sound sources have different frequencies, while at low pressure they have the same frequency. The generation of bird trills involves modulation of the pressure in air sacs. Since so many aspects of birdsong depend on air sac pressure, there is a trade off between trill rate and the duration of each call, though this has been studied in depth.

== Function ==
Birds' lungs obtain fresh air during both exhalation and inhalation, because the air sacs do all the "pumping" and the lungs simply absorb oxygen.

From about 1870 onwards scientists have generally agreed that the post-cranial skeletons of many dinosaurs contained many air-filled cavities (postcranial skeletal pneumaticity), especially in the vertebrae. Pneumatization of the skull (such as paranasal sinuses) is found in both synapsids and archosaurs, but postcranial pneumatization is found only in birds, non-avian saurischian dinosaurs, and pterosaurs.

For a long time these cavities were regarded simply as weight-saving devices, but Bakker proposed that they were connected to air sacs like those that make birds' respiratory systems the most efficient of all animals'.

John Ruben et al. (1997, 1999, 2003, 2004) disputed this and suggested that dinosaurs had a "tidal" respiratory system (in and out) powered by a crocodile-like hepatic piston mechanism – muscles attached mainly to the pubis pull the liver backwards, which makes the lungs expand to inhale; when these muscles relax, the lungs return to their previous size and shape, and the animal exhales. They also presented this as a reason for doubting that birds descended from dinosaurs.

Critics have claimed that, without avian air sacs, modest improvements in a few aspects of a modern reptile's circulatory and respiratory systems would enable the reptile to achieve 50% to 70% of the oxygen flow of a mammal of similar size, and that lack of avian air sacs would not prevent the development of endothermy. Very few formal rebuttals have been published in scientific journals of Ruben et al.'s claim that dinosaurs could not have had avian-style air sacs; but one points out that the Sinosauropteryx fossil on which they based much of their argument was severely flattened and therefore it was impossible to tell whether the liver was the right shape to act as part of a hepatic piston mechanism. Some recent papers simply note without further comment that Ruben et al. argued against the presence of air sacs in dinosaurs.

== Evidence ==
Researchers have presented evidence and arguments for air sacs in sauropods, "prosauropods", coelurosaurs, ceratosaurs, and the theropods Aerosteon and Coelophysis.

In advanced sauropods ("neosauropods") the vertebrae of the lower back and hip regions show signs of air sacs. In early sauropods only the cervical (neck) vertebrae show these features. If the developmental sequence found in bird embryos is a guide, air sacs actually evolved before the channels in the skeleton that accommodate them in later forms.

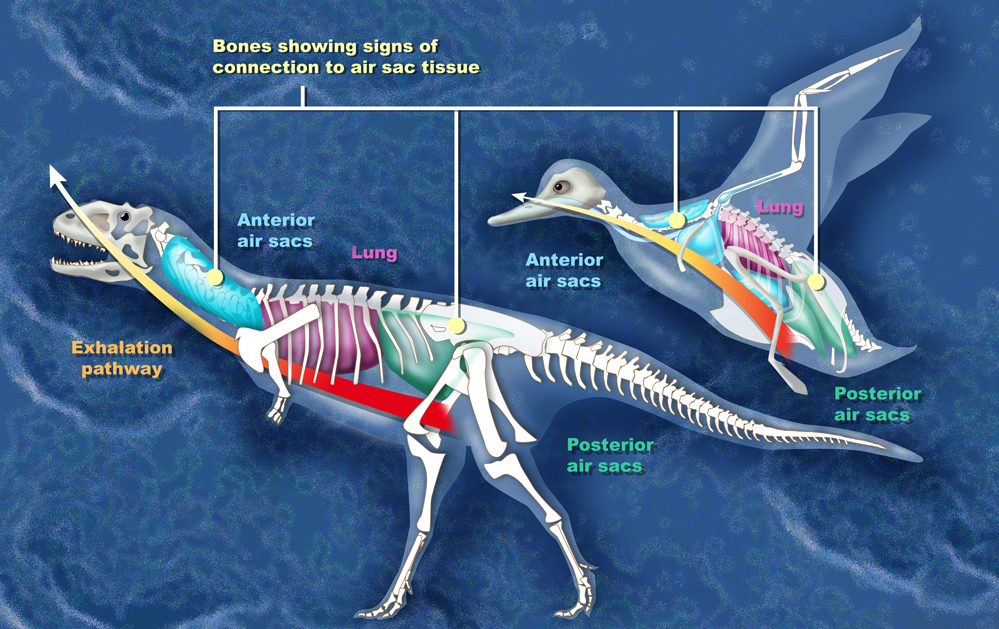
Comparison between the air sacs of Majungasaurus and a bird

Evidence of air sacs has also been found in theropods. Studies indicate that fossils of coelurosaurs, ceratosaurs, and the theropods Coelophysis and Aerosteon exhibit evidence of air sacs. Coelophysis, from the late Triassic, is one of the earliest dinosaurs whose fossils show evidence of channels for air sacs. Aerosteon, a Late Cretaceous megaraptorid, had the most bird-like air sacs found so far.

Early sauropodomorphs, including the group traditionally called "prosauropods", may also have had air sacs. Although possible pneumatic indentations have been found in Plateosaurus and Thecodontosaurus, the indentations are very small. One study in 2007 concluded that prosauropods likely had abdominal and cervical air sacs, based on the evidence for them in sister taxa (theropods and sauropods). The study concluded that it was impossible to determine whether prosauropods had a bird-like flow-through lung, but that the air sacs were almost certainly present. A further indication for the presence of air sacs and their use in lung ventilation comes from a reconstruction of the air exchange volume (the volume of air exchanged with each breath) of Plateosaurus, which when expressed as a ratio of air volume per body weight at 29 ml/kg is similar to values of geese and other birds, and much higher than typical mammalian values.

So far no evidence of air sacs has been found in ornithischian dinosaurs. But this does not imply that ornithischians could not have had metabolic rates comparable to those of mammals, since mammals also do not have air sacs.

== Development ==
Three explanations have been suggested for the development of air sacs in dinosaurs:

- Increase in respiratory capacity. This is probably the most common hypothesis, and fits well with the idea that many dinosaurs had fairly high metabolic rates.
- Improving balance and maneuvrability by lowering the center of gravity and reducing rotational inertia. However this does not explain the expansion of air sacs in the quadrupedal sauropods.
- As a cooling mechanism. It seems that air sacs and feathers evolved at about the same time in coelurosaurs. If feathers retained heat, their owners would have required a means of dissipating excess heat. This idea is plausible but needs further empirical support.

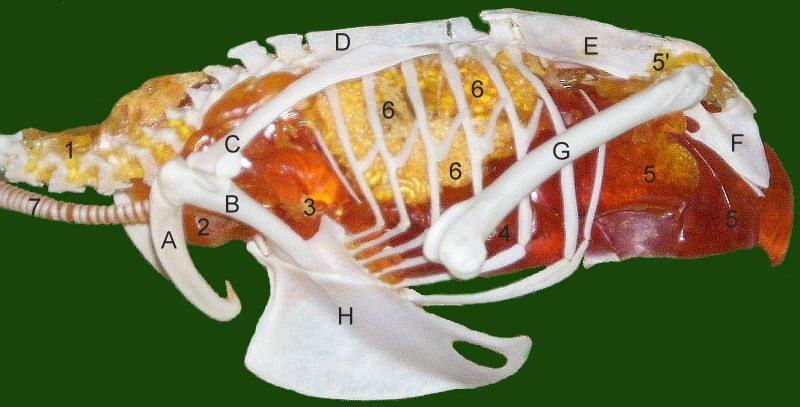
The uncinate processes are the small white spurs about halfway along the ribs. The rest of this diagram shows the air sacs and other parts of a bird's respiratory system: 1 cervical air sac, 2 clavicular air sac, 3 cranial thoracal air sac, 4 caudal thoracal air sac, 5 abdominal air sac (5' diverticulus into pelvic girdle), 6 lung, 7 trachea

Dinosaur respiratory systems with bird-like air sacs may have been capable of sustaining higher activity levels than mammals of similar size and build can sustain. In addition to providing a very efficient supply of oxygen, the rapid airflow would have been an effective cooling mechanism, which is essential for animals that are active but too large to get rid of all the excess heat through their skins.

Calculations of the volumes of various parts of the sauropod Apatosaurus' respiratory system support the evidence of bird-like air sacs in sauropods:

- Assuming that Apatosaurus, like dinosaurs' nearest surviving relatives crocodilians and birds, did not have a diaphragm, the dead-space volume of a 30-ton specimen would be about 184 liters. This is the total volume of the mouth, trachea and air tubes. If the animal exhales less than this, stale air is not expelled and is sucked back into the lungs on the following inhalation.
- Estimates of its tidal volume – the amount of air moved into or out of the lungs in a single breath – depend on the type of respiratory system the animal had: 904 liters if avian; 225 liters if mammalian; 19 liters if reptilian.

On this basis, Apatosaurus could not have had a reptilian respiratory system, as its tidal volume would have been less than its dead-space volume, so that stale air was not expelled but was sucked back into the lungs. Likewise, a mammalian system would only provide to the lungs about 225 − 184 = 41 liters of fresh, oxygenated air on each breath. Apatosaurus must therefore have had either a system unknown in the modern world or one like birds', with multiple air sacs and a flow-through lung. Furthermore, an avian system would only need a lung volume of about 600 liters while a mammalian one would have required about 2,950 liters, which would exceed the estimated 1,700 liters of space available in a 30-ton Apatosaurus′ chest.

The palaeontologist Peter Ward has argued that the evolution of the air sac system, which first appears in the very earliest dinosaurs, may have been in response to the very low (11%) atmospheric oxygen of the Carnian and Norian ages of the Triassic Period.
