= Air sac (disambiguation) =

Air sac generally refers to an organ or portion of an organ containing air within an animal's respiratory system. It may refer specifically to:

- Pulmonary alveolus, small hollow cavities which are a part of the lungs within mammals
- Air sacs, structures in the saurischian dinosaur respiratory system, including the extant bird respiratory system

== See also ==
- Lung § Reptiles
