= Bird anatomy =

Physiological structure of birds' bodies

External anatomy (topography) of a typical bird (in this case, a yellow wattled lapwing): 1. Beak; 2. Head; 3. Iris; 4. Pupil; 5. Mantle; 6. Lesser coverts; 7. Scapulars; 8. Coverts; 9. Tertials; 10. Rump; 11. Primaries; 12. Vent; 13. Thigh; 14. Tibio-tarsal articulation; 15. Tarsus; 16. Feet; 17. Tibia; 18. Belly; 19. Flanks; 20. Breast; 21. Throat; 22. Wattle; 23. Eyestripe

Bird anatomy, or the physiological structure of birds' bodies, shows many unique adaptations, mostly aiding flight. Birds have a light skeletal system and light but powerful musculature which, along with circulatory and respiratory systems capable of very high metabolic rates and oxygen supply, permit the bird to fly. The development of a beak has led to evolution of a specially adapted digestive system.

== Skeletal system ==
A stylised dove skeleton.: 1. skull; 2. cervical vertebrae; 3. furcula; 4. coracoid; 5. uncinate processes of ribs; 6. keel; 7. patella; 8. tarsometatarsus; 9. digits; 10. tibia (tibiotarsus); 11. fibula (tibiotarsus); 12. femur; 13. ischium (innominate); 14. pubis (innominate); 15. ilium (innominate); 16. caudal vertebrae; 17. pygostyle; 18. synsacrum; 19. scapula; 20. dorsal vertebrae; 21. humerus; 22. ulna; 23. radius; 24. Carpometacarpus; 25. Digit III; 26. Digit II; 27. Digit I (alula)

Birds have many bones that are hollow (pneumatized) with criss-crossing struts or trusses for structural strength. The number of hollow bones varies among species, though large gliding and soaring birds tend to have the most. Respiratory air sacs often form air pockets within the semi-hollow bones of the bird's skeleton. The bones of diving birds are often less hollow than those of non-diving species. Penguins, loons, puffins, and kiwis are without pneumatized bones entirely. Flightless birds, such as ostriches and emus, have pneumatized femurs and, in the case of the emu, pneumatized cervical vertebrae. In most birds, non-pneumatized bones are filled with bone marrow.

=== Axial skeleton ===
The bird skeleton is highly adapted for flight. It is extremely lightweight but strong enough to withstand the stresses of taking off, flying, and landing. One key adaptation is the fusing of bones into single ossifications, such as the pygostyle. Because of this, birds usually have a smaller number of bones than other terrestrial vertebrates. Birds also lack teeth or even a true jaw and instead have a beak, which is far more lightweight. The beaks of many baby birds have a projection called an egg tooth, which facilitates their exit from the amniotic egg. It falls off once the egg has been penetrated.

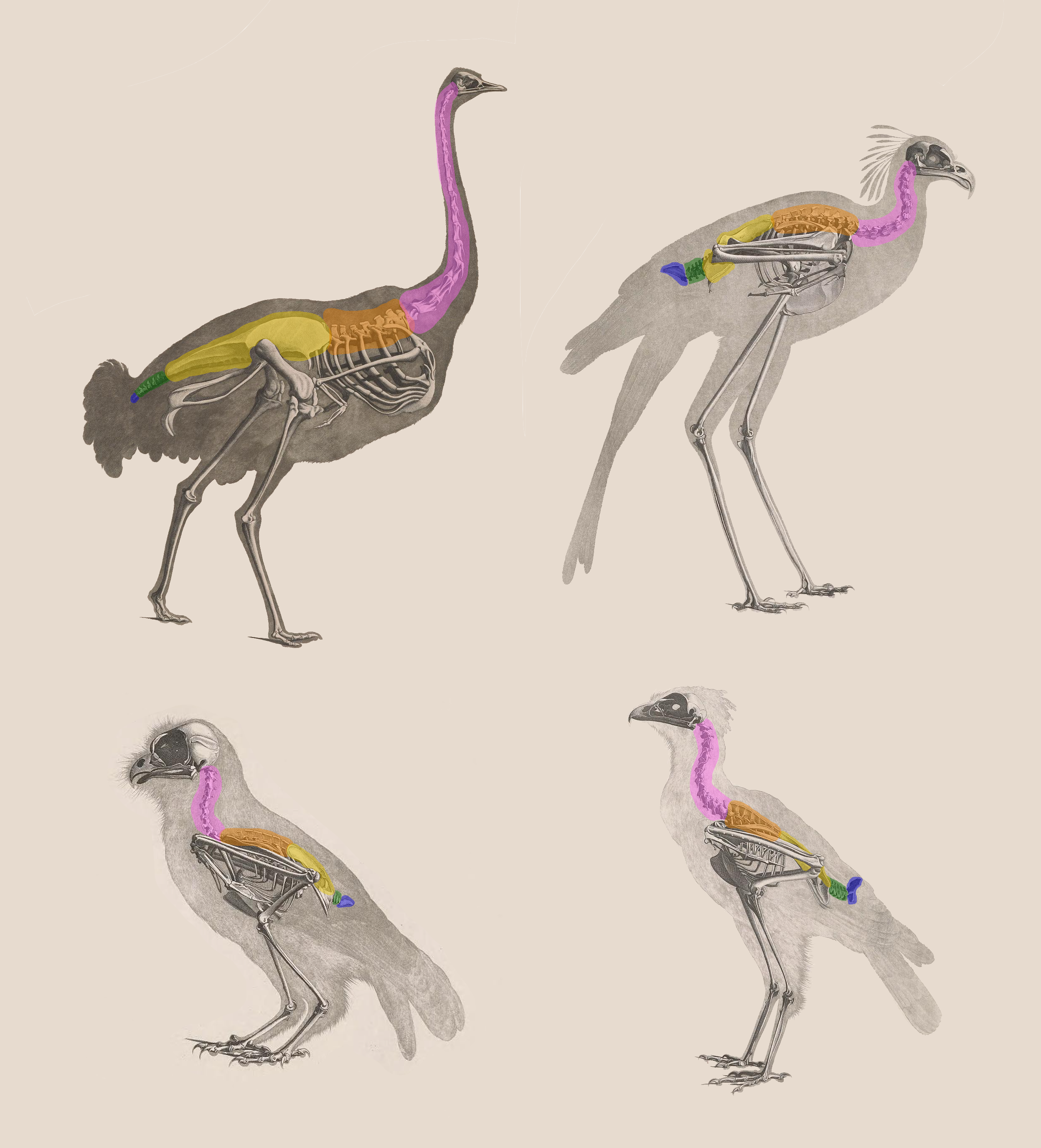
Collage of bird anatomical illustrations with the different vertebral sections color-coded across various species. The species included are as follows: Top row (left to right) Struthio camelus and Sagittarius serpentarius (formerly Gypogeranus serpentarius) Bottom row (left to right) Megascops choliba decussatus (formerly known as Strix decussata) and Falco rusticolus islandus (formerly Falco islandus). Sections of the vertebral column in anatomical bird diagrams: Color / Vertebral section; Pink / Cervical vertebrae; Orange / Thoracic/dorsal vertebrae; Yellow / Synsacrum; Green / Caudal vertebrae; Blue / Pygostyle

==== Vertebral column ====
The vertebral column is divided into five sections of vertebrae:

===== Cervical vertebrae =====
The cervical vertebrae provide structural support to the neck and number between 8 and as many as 25 vertebrae in certain swan species (Cygninae) and other long-necked birds. All cervical vertebrae have transverse processes attached except the first one. This vertebra (C1) is called the atlas which articulates with the occipital condyles of the skull and lacks the foramen typical of most vertebrae. The neck of a bird is composed of many cervical vertebrae enabling birds to have increased flexibility. A flexible neck allows many birds with immobile eyes to move their head more productively and center their sight on objects that are close or far in distance. Most birds have about three times as many neck vertebrae as humans, which allows for increased stability during fast movements such as flying, landing, and taking-off. The neck plays a role in head-bobbing which is present in at least eight out of 44 orders of birds, including Columbiformes, Galliformes, and Gruiformes. Head-bobbing is an optokinetic response which stabilizes a bird's surroundings as it alternates between a thrust phase and a hold phase. Head-bobbing is synchronous with the feet as the head moves in accordance with the rest of the body. Data from various studies suggest that the main reason for head-bobbing in some birds is for the stabilization of their surroundings, although it is uncertain why some but not all bird orders show head-bob.

===== Thoracic vertebrae =====
The thoracic vertebrae number between five and ten, and the first thoracic vertebra is distinguishable due to the fusion of its attached rib to the sternum while the ribs of cervical vertebrae are free. Anterior thoracic vertebrae are fused in many birds and articulate with the notarium of the pectoral girdle.

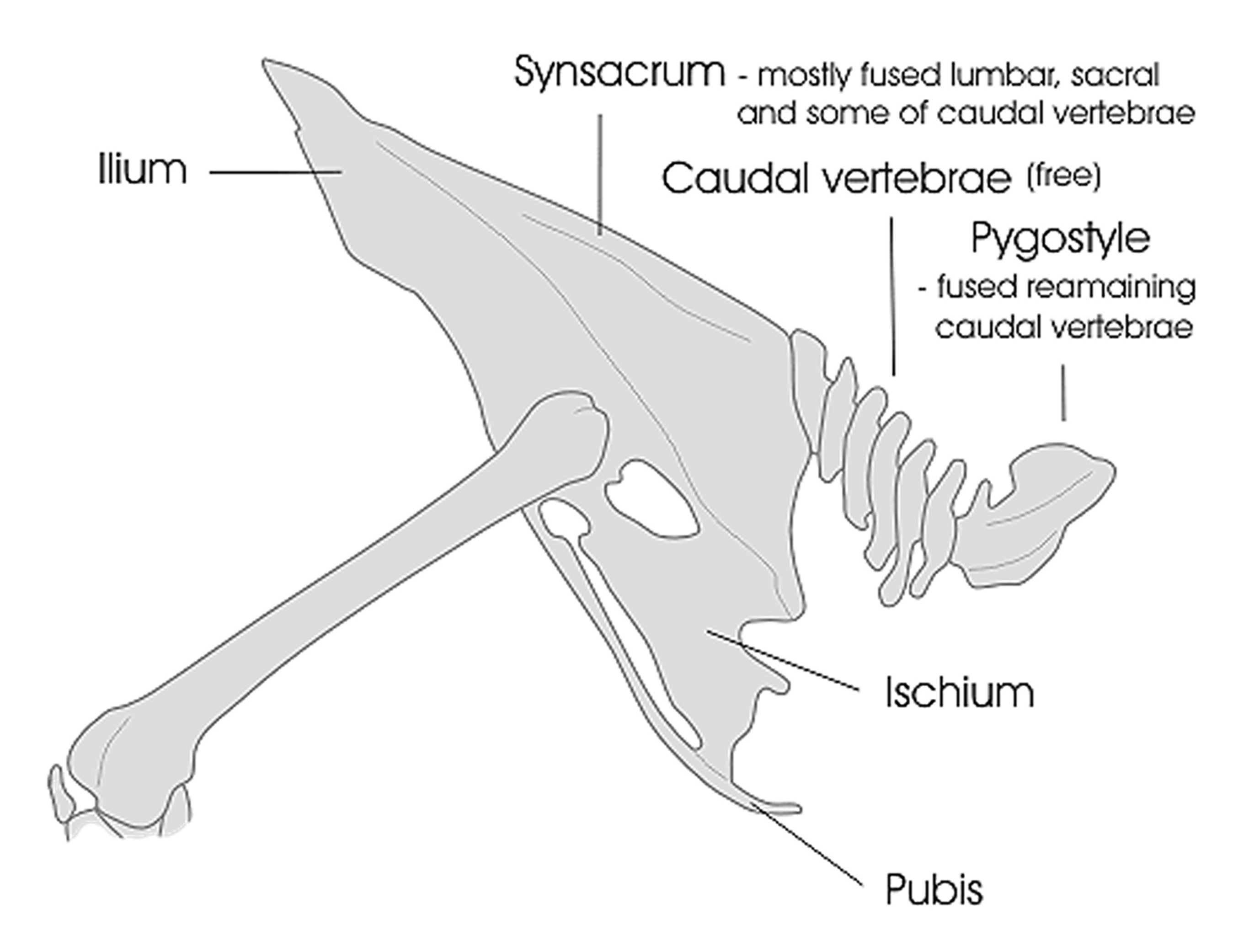
Diagram of a general bird pelvic girdle skeleton including the lower vertebral column sections. Note that the caudal vertebrae (5–10) are not fused in this diagram but can be in certain species.

===== Synsacrum =====
The synsacrum consists of one thoracic, six lumbar, two sacral, and five sacro-caudal vertebrae fused into one ossified structure that then fuse with the ilium. When not in flight, this structure provides the main support for the rest of the body. Similar to the sacrum of mammals, the synsacrum lacks the distinct disc shape of cervical and thoracic vertebrae.

===== Caudal vertebrae =====
The free vertebrae immediately following the fused sacro-caudal vertebrae of the synsacrum are known as the caudal vertebrae. Birds have between five and eight free caudal vertebrae. The caudal vertebrae provide structure to the tails of vertebrates and are homologous to the coccyx found in mammals lacking tails.

===== Pygostyle =====
In birds, the last four caudal vertebrae are fused to form the pygostyle. Some sources note that up to ten caudal vertebrae may make up this fused structure. This structure provides an attachment point for tail feathers that aid in control of flight.

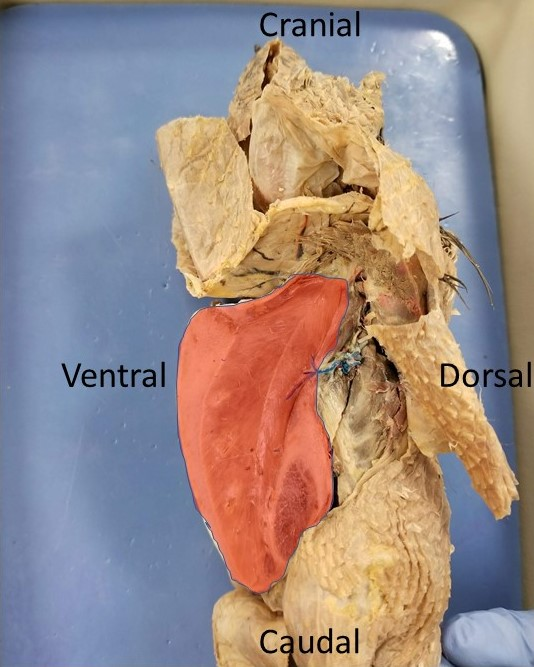
Highlighted in red is an intact keeled sternum of a dissected pigeon. In flying birds the sternum is enlarged for increased muscle attachment.

==== Scapular girdle ====
Birds are the only living vertebrates to have fused collarbones and a keeled breastbone. The keeled sternum serves as an attachment site for the muscles used in flying or swimming. Flightless birds, such as ostriches, lack a keeled sternum and have denser and heavier bones compared to birds that fly. Swimming birds have a wide sternum, walking birds have a long sternum, and flying birds have a sternum that is nearly equal in width and height. The chest consists of the furcula (wishbone) and coracoid (collar bone) which, together with the scapula, form the pectoral girdle; the side of the chest is formed by the ribs, which meet at the sternum (mid-line of the chest).

==== Ribs ====
Birds have uncinate processes on the ribs. These are hooked extensions of bone which help to strengthen the rib cage by overlapping with the rib behind them. This feature is also found in the tuatara (Sphenodon).

==== Skull ====
The typical cranial anatomy of a bird. Pmx= premaxilla, M= maxilla, D= dentary, V= vomer, Pal= palatine, Pt= Pterygoid, Lc= Lacrimal

The skull consists of five major bones: the frontal (top of head), parietal (back of head), premaxillary and nasal (top beak), and the mandible (bottom beak). The skull of a normal bird usually weighs about 1% of the bird's total body weight. The eye occupies a considerable amount of the skull and is surrounded by a scleral ring, a ring of tiny overlapping bones. This ring is also seen in non-avian reptiles and various other vertebrates.

Broadly speaking, avian skulls consist of many small, non-overlapping bones. Pedomorphosis, maintenance of the ancestral state in adults, is thought to have facilitated the evolution of the avian skull. In essence, adult bird skulls will resemble the juvenile form of their theropod dinosaur ancestors. As the avian lineage has progressed and as pedomorphosis has occurred, they have lost the postorbital bone behind the eye, the ectopterygoid at the back of the palate, and teeth. The palate structures have also become greatly altered with changes, mostly reductions, seen in the pterygoid, palatine, and jugal bones. A reduction in the adductor chambers has also occurred. These are all conditions seen in the juvenile form of their ancestors. The premaxillary bone has also hypertrophied to form the beak while the maxilla has become diminished, as suggested by both developmental and paleontological studies. This expansion into the beak has occurred in tandem with the loss of a functional hand and the developmental of a point at the front of the beak that resembles a "finger". The premaxilla is also known to play a large role in feeding behaviours in fish.

The structure of the avian skull has important implications for their feeding behaviours. Birds show independent movement of the skull bones known as cranial kinesis. Cranial kinesis in birds occurs in several forms, but all of the different varieties are all made possible by the anatomy of the skull. Animals with large, overlapping bones (including the ancestors of modern birds) have akinetic (non-kinetic) skulls. For this reason it has been argued that the pedomorphic bird beak can be seen as an evolutionary innovation.

Birds have a diapsid skull, as in reptiles, with a pre-lachrymal fossa (present in some reptiles). The skull has a single occipital condyle.

=== Appendicular skeleton ===
The shoulder consists of the scapula (shoulder blade), coracoid, and humerus (upper arm). The humerus joins the radius and ulna (forearm) to form the elbow. The carpus and metacarpus form the "wrist" and "hand" of the bird, and the digits are fused together. The bones in the wing are extremely light so that the bird can fly more easily.

The hips consist of the pelvis, which includes three major bones: the ilium (top of the hip), ischium (sides of hip), and pubis (front of the hip). These are fused into one (the innominate bone). Innominate bones are evolutionary significant in that they allow birds to lay eggs. They meet at the acetabulum (hip socket) and articulate with the femur, which is the first bone of the hind limb.

The upper leg consists of the femur. At the knee joint, the femur connects to the tibiotarsus (shin) and fibula (side of lower leg). The tarsometatarsus forms the upper part of the foot, digits make up the toes. The leg bones of birds are the heaviest, contributing to a low center of gravity, which aids in flight. A bird's skeleton accounts for only about 5% of its total body weight.

They have a greatly elongate tetradiate pelvis, similar to some reptiles. The hind limb has an intra-tarsal joint found also in some reptiles. There is extensive fusion of the trunk vertebrae as well as fusion with the pectoral girdle.

==== Feet ====
Four types of bird feet

Birds' feet are classified as anisodactyl, zygodactyl, heterodactyl, syndactyl or pamprodactyl. Anisodactyl is the most common arrangement of digits in birds, with three toes forward and one back. This is common in songbirds and other perching birds, as well as hunting birds like eagles, hawks, and falcons.

Syndactyly, as it occurs in birds, is like anisodactyly, except that the second and third toes (the inner and middle forward-pointing toes), or three toes, are fused together, as in the belted kingfisher Ceryle alcyon. This is characteristic of Coraciiformes (kingfishers, bee-eaters, rollers, etc.).

Zygodactyl (from Greek ζυγον, a yoke) feet have two toes facing forward (digits two and three) and two back (digits one and four). This arrangement is most common in arboreal species, particularly those that climb tree trunks or clamber through foliage. Zygodactyly occurs in the parrots, woodpeckers (including flickers), cuckoos (including roadrunners), and some owls. Zygodactyl tracks have been found dating to 120–110 Ma (early Cretaceous), 50 million years before the first identified zygodactyl fossils.

Heterodactyly is like zygodactyly, except that digits three and four point forward and digits one and two point back. This is found only in trogons, while pamprodactyl is an arrangement in which all four toes may point forward, or birds may rotate the outer two toes backward. It is a characteristic of swifts (Apodidae).

=== Evolution ===
==== Hind limb change ====
A significant similarity in the structure of the hind limbs of birds and other dinosaurs is associated with their ability to walk on two legs, or bipedalism. In the 20th century, the prevailing opinion was that the transition to bipedalism occurred due to the transformation of the forelimbs into wings. Modern scientists believe that, on the contrary, it was a necessary condition for the occurrence of flight.

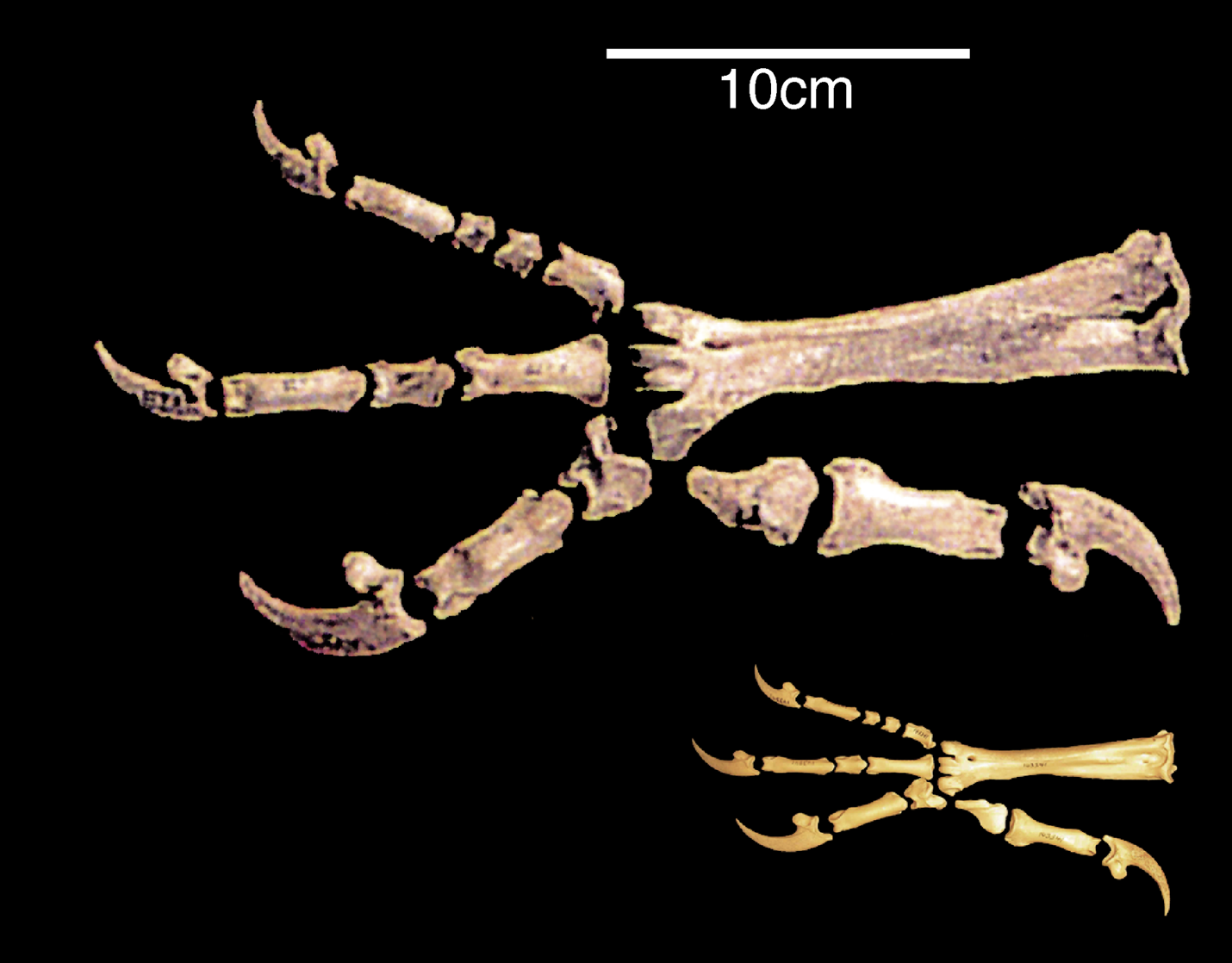
Comparative morphology of the paw skeleton of the extinct Haast's eagle with its closest living relative the little eagle.

The transition to the use of only the hind limbs for movement was accompanied by an increase in the rigidity of the lumbar and sacral regions. The pubic bones of birds and some other bipedal dinosaurs are turned backward. Scientists associate this with a shift in the center of gravity of the body backward. The reason for this shift is called the transition to bipedality or the development of powerful forelimbs, as in Archaeopteryx. The large and heavy tail of two-legged dinosaurs may have been an additional support. Partial tail reduction and subsequent formation of pygostyle occurred due to the backward deviation of the first toe of the hind limb; in dinosaurs with a long rigid tail, the development of the foot proceeded differently. This process, apparently, took place in parallel in birds and some other dinosaurs. In general, the anisodactyl foot, which also has a better grasping ability and allows confident movement both on the ground and along branches, is ancestral for birds. Against this background, pterosaurs stand out, which, in the process of unsuccessful evolutionary changes, could not fully move on two legs, but instead developed a physical means of flight that was fundamentally different from birds.

==== Forelimb changes ====
Changes in the hindlimbs did not affect the location of the forelimbs, which in birds remained laterally spaced, and in non-avian dinosaurs they switched to a parasagittal orientation. At the same time, the forelimbs, freed from the support function, had ample opportunities for evolutionary changes. Proponents of the running hypothesis believe that flight was formed through fast running, bouncing, and then gliding. The forelimbs could be used for grasping after a jump or as "insect trapping nets", animals could wave them, helping themselves during the jump. According to the arboreal hypothesis, the ancestors of birds climbed trees with the help of their forelimbs, and from there they planned, after which they proceeded to flight.

== Muscular system ==
The supracoracoideus works using a pulley-like system to lift the wing while the pectorals provide the powerful downstroke

Most birds have approximately 175 different muscles, mainly controlling the wings, skin, and legs. Overall, the muscle mass of birds is concentrated ventrally. The largest muscles in the bird are the pectorals, or the pectoralis major, which control the wings and make up about 15–25% of a flighted bird's body weight. They provide the powerful wing stroke essential for flight. The muscle deep to (underneath) the pectorals is the supracoracoideus, or the pectoralis minor. It raises the wing between wingbeats. Both muscle groups attach to the keel of the sternum. This is remarkable, because other vertebrates have the muscles to raise the upper limbs generally attached to areas on the back of the spine. The supracoracoideus and the pectorals together make up about 25–40% of the bird's full body weight. Caudal to the pectorals and supracoracoideus are the internal and external obliques which compress the abdomen. Additionally, there are other abdominal muscles present that expand and contract the chest, and hold the ribcage. The muscles of the wing, as seen in the labelled images, function mainly in extending or flexing the elbow, moving the wing as a whole or in extending or flexing particular digits. These muscles work to adjust the wings for flight and all other actions. Muscle composition does vary between species and even within families.

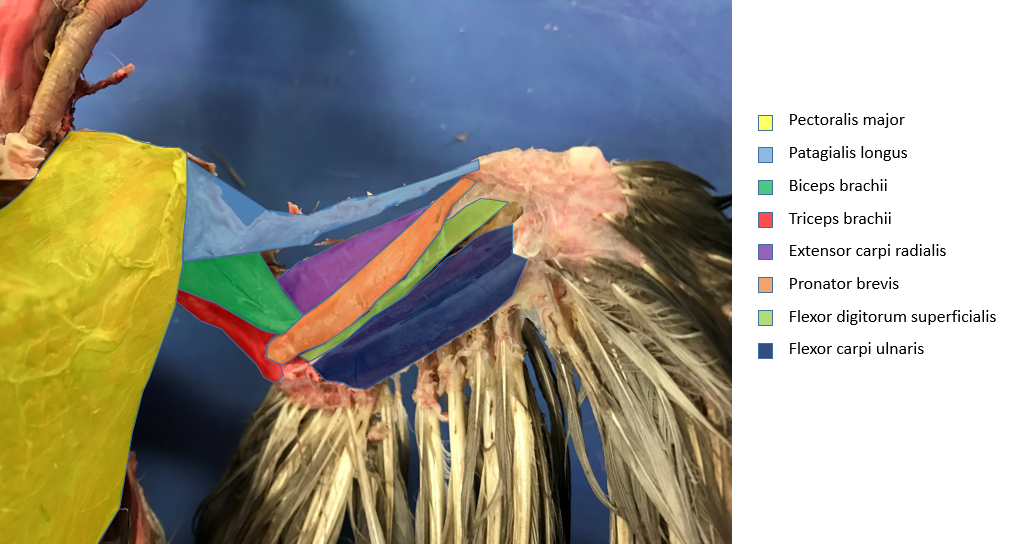
Labelled ventral musculature of a pigeon wing

Birds have unique necks which are elongated with complex musculature as it must allow for the head to perform functions other animals may utilize pectoral limbs for.

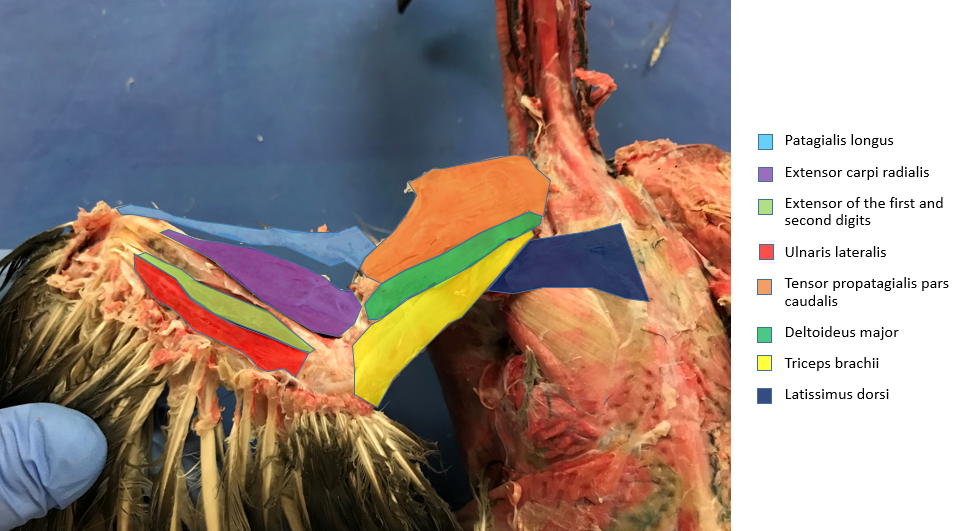
Labelled dorsal musculature of a pigeon wing

The skin muscles help a bird in its flight by adjusting the feathers, which are attached to the skin muscle and help the bird in its flight maneuvers as well as aiding in mating rituals.

There are only a few muscles in the trunk and the tail, but they are very strong and are essential for the bird. These include the lateralis caudae and the levator caudae which control movement of the tail and the spreading of rectrices, giving the tail a larger surface area which helps keep the bird in the air as well as aiding in turning.

Muscle composition and adaptation differ by theories of muscle adaptation in whether evolution of flight came from flapping or gliding first.

== Integumentary system ==
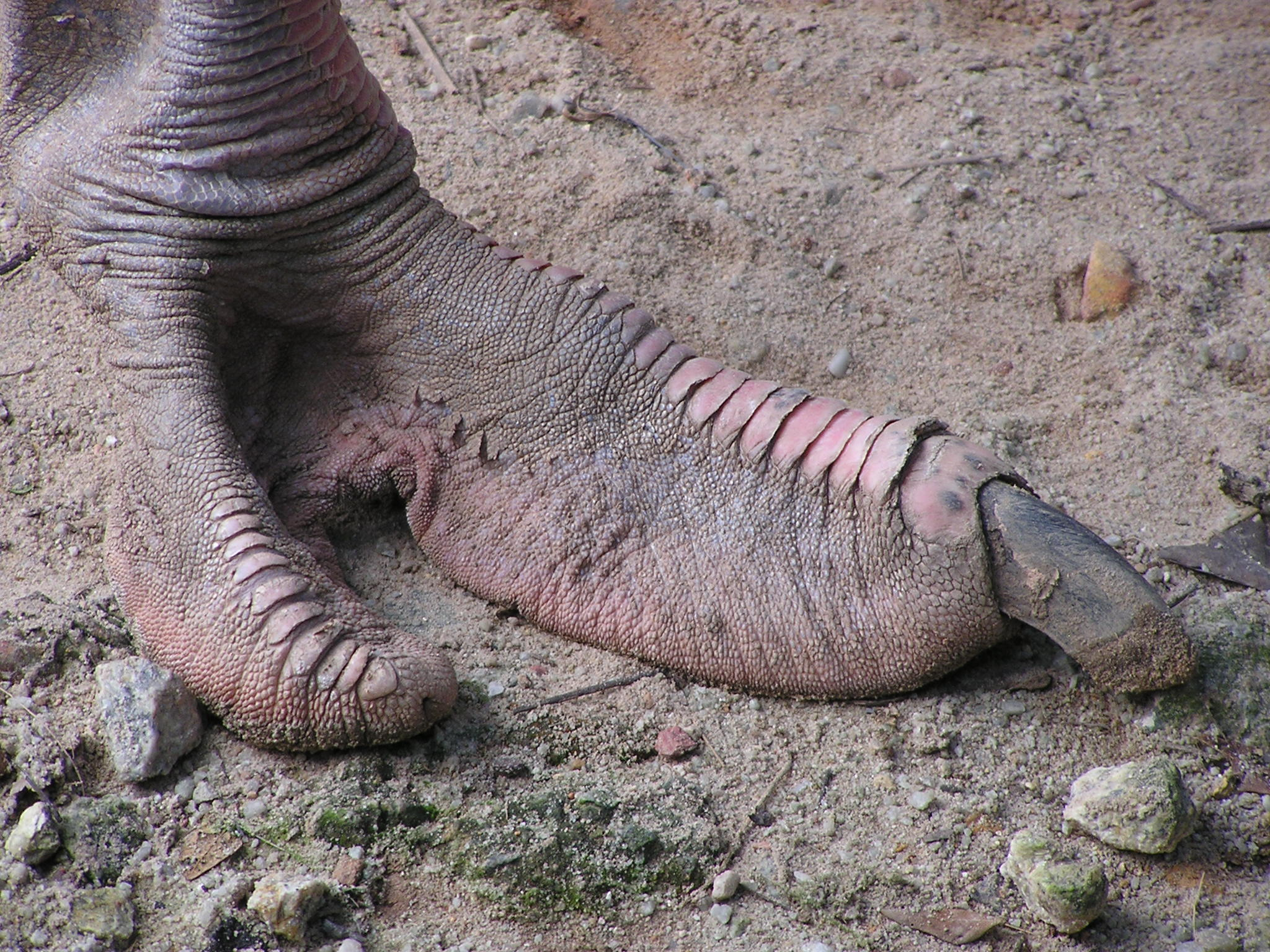
Ostrich foot integument (podotheca)

=== Scales ===
The scales of birds are composed of keratin, like beaks, claws, and spurs. They are found mainly on the toes and tarsi (lower leg of birds), usually up to the tibio-tarsal joint, but may be found further up the legs in some birds. In many of the eagles and owls, the legs are feathered down to (but not including) their toes. Most bird scales do not overlap significantly, except in the cases of kingfishers and woodpeckers. The scales and scutes of birds were originally thought to be homologous to those of reptiles; however, more recent research suggests that scales in birds re-evolved after the evolution of feathers.

Bird embryos begin development with smooth skin. On the feet, the corneum, or outermost layer, of this skin may keratinize, thicken and form scales. These scales can be organized into;

- Cancella – minute scales which are really just a thickening and hardening of the skin, crisscrossed with shallow grooves.
- Scutella – scales that are not quite as large as scutes, such as those found on the caudal, or hind part, of the chicken metatarsus.
- Scutes – the largest scales, usually on the anterior surface of the metatarsus and dorsal surface of the toes.

The rows of scutes on the anterior of the metatarsus can be called an "acrometatarsium" or "acrotarsium".

Reticula are located on the lateral and medial surfaces (sides) of the foot and were originally thought to be separate scales. However, histological and evolutionary developmental work in this area revealed that these structures lack beta-keratin (a hallmark of reptilian scales) and are entirely composed of alpha-keratin. This, along with their unique structure, has led to the suggestion that these are actually feather buds that were arrested early in development.

Collectively, the scaly covering present on the foot of the birds is called podotheca.

=== Herbst corpuscles and lore ===
The bills of many waders have Herbst corpuscles which help them find prey hidden under wet sand, by detecting minute pressure differences in the water. All extant birds can move the parts of the upper jaw relative to the brain case. However, this is more prominent in some birds and can be readily detected in parrots.

The region between the eye and bill on the side of a bird's head is called the lore. This region is sometimes featherless, and the skin may be tinted, as in many species of the cormorant family.

=== Beak ===
The beak, bill, or rostrum is an external anatomical structure of birds which is used for eating and for preening, manipulating objects, killing prey, fighting, probing for food, courtship and feeding young. Although beaks vary significantly in size, shape and color, they share a similar underlying structure. Two bony projections—the upper and lower mandibles—covered with a thin keratinized layer of epidermis known as the rhamphotheca. In most species, two holes known as nares lead to the respiratory system.

== Respiratory system ==
The arrangement of the air sacs and lungs in birds

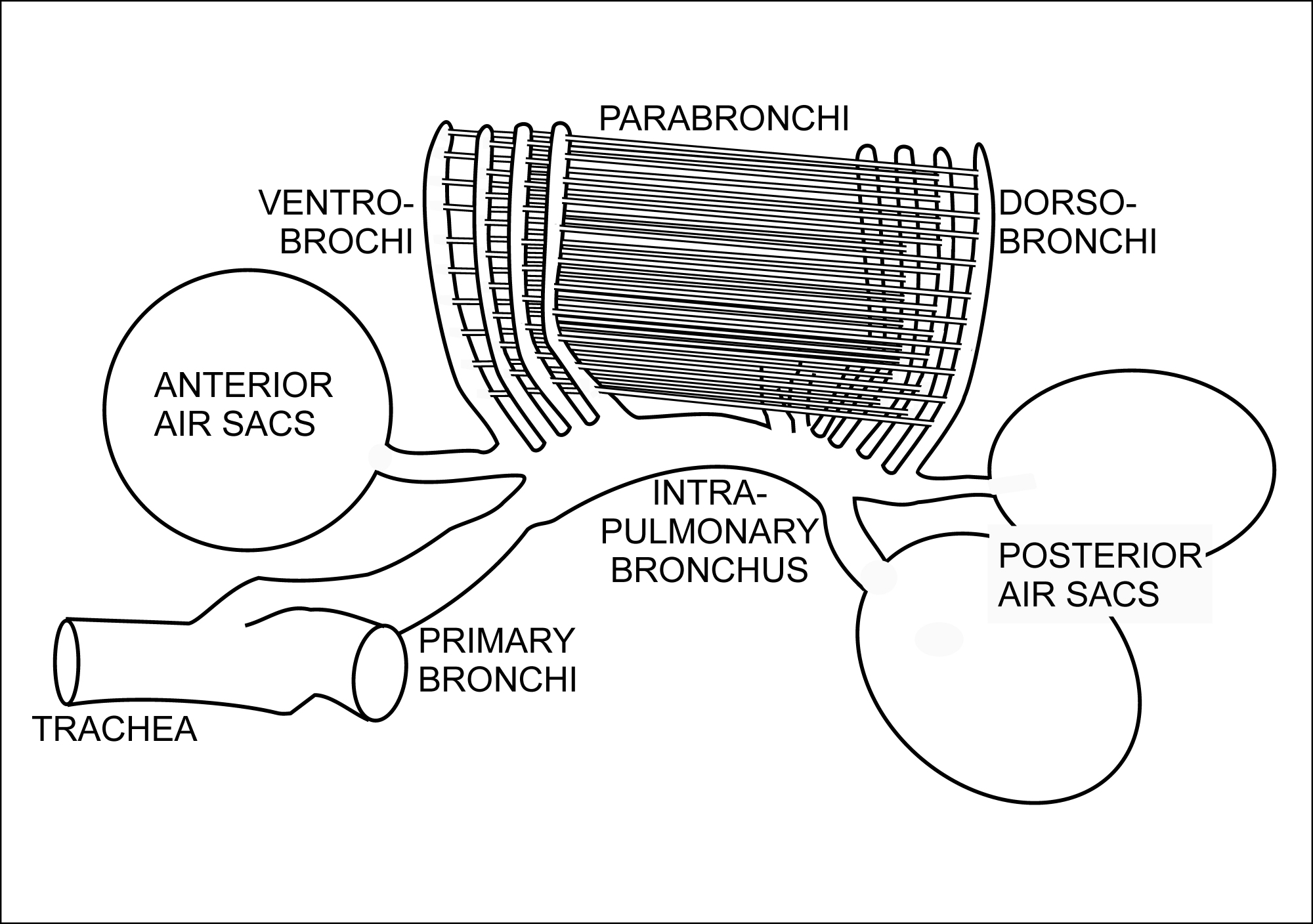
The anatomy of bird's respiratory system, showing the relationships of the trachea, primary and intra-pulmonary bronchi, the dorso- and ventro-bronchi, with the parabronchi running between the two. The posterior and anterior air sacs are also indicated, but not to scale.

Inhalation–exhalation cycle in birds.

Due to the high metabolic rate required for flight, birds have a high oxygen demand. Their highly effective respiratory system helps them meet that demand.

Although birds have lungs, theirs are fairly rigid structures that do not expand and contract as they do in mammals, reptiles and many amphibians. Instead, the structures that act as the bellows that ventilate the lungs are the air sacs, which are distributed throughout much of the birds' bodies. The air sacs move air unidirectionally through the parabronchi of the rigid lungs. The primary mechanism of unidirectional flows in bird lungs is flow irreversibility at high Reynolds number manifested in asymmetric junctions and their loop-forming connectivity.

Although avian lungs are smaller than those of mammals of comparable size, the air sacs account for 15% of the total body volume, whereas in mammals, the alveoli, which act as the bellows, constitute only 7% of the total body volume. Overall, avian lungs have a respiratory surface area that is approximately 15% greater, a pulmonary capillary blood volume that is 2.5-3 larger and a blood-gas barrier that is 56-67% thinner than those in the lungs of mammals of a similar body mass. The walls of the air sacs do not have a good blood supply and so do not play a direct role in gas exchange.

Birds lack a diaphragm, and therefore use their intercostal and abdominal muscles to expand and contract their entire thoraco-abdominal cavities, thus rhythmically changing the volumes of all their air sacs in unison (illustration on the right). The active phase of respiration in birds is exhalation, requiring contraction of their muscles of respiration. Relaxation of these muscles causes inhalation.

Three distinct sets of organs perform respiration—the anterior air sacs (interclavicular, cervicals, and anterior thoracics), the lungs, and the posterior air sacs (posterior thoracics and abdominals). Typically there are nine air sacs within the system; however, that number can range between seven and twelve, depending on the species of bird. Passerines possess seven air sacs, as the clavicular air sacs may interconnect or be fused with the anterior thoracic sacs.

During inhalation, environmental air initially enters the bird through the nostrils from where it is heated, humidified, and filtered in the nasal passages and upper parts of the trachea. From there, the air enters the lower trachea and continues to just beyond the syrinx, at which point the trachea branches into two primary bronchi, going to the two lungs. The primary bronchi enter the lungs to become the intrapulmonary bronchi, which give off a set of parallel branches called ventrobronchi and, a little further on, an equivalent set of dorsobronchi. The ends of the intrapulmonary bronchi discharge air into the posterior air sacs at the caudal end of the bird. Each pair of dorso-ventrobronchi is connected by a large number of parallel microscopic air capillaries (or parabronchi) where gas exchange occurs. As the bird inhales, tracheal air flows through the intrapulmonary bronchi into the posterior air sacs, as well as into the dorsobronchi (but not into the ventrobronchi whose openings into the intrapulmonary bronchi were previously believed to be tightly closed during inhalation. However, more recent studies have shown that the aerodynamics of the bronchial architecture directs the inhaled air away from the openings of the ventrobronchi, into the continuation of the intrapulmonary bronchus towards the dorsobronchi and posterior air sacs). From the dorsobronchi the air flows through the parabronchi (and therefore the gas exchanger) to the ventrobronchi from where the air can only escape into the expanding anterior air sacs. So, during inhalation, both the posterior and anterior air sacs expand, the posterior air sacs filling with fresh inhaled air, while the anterior air sacs fill with "spent" (oxygen-poor) air that has just passed through the lungs.

During exhalation, the intrapulmonary bronchi were believed to be tightly constricted between the region where the ventrobronchi branch off and the region where the dorsobronchi branch off. But it is now believed that more intricate aerodynamic features have the same effect. The contracting posterior air sacs can therefore only empty into the dorsobronchi. From there, the fresh air from the posterior air sacs flows through the parabronchi (in the same direction as occurred during inhalation) into ventrobronchi. The air passages connecting the ventrobronchi and anterior air sacs to the intrapulmonary bronchi open up during exhalation, thus allowing oxygen-poor air from these two organs to escape via the trachea to the exterior. Oxygenated air therefore flows constantly (during the entire breathing cycle) in a single direction through the parabronchi.

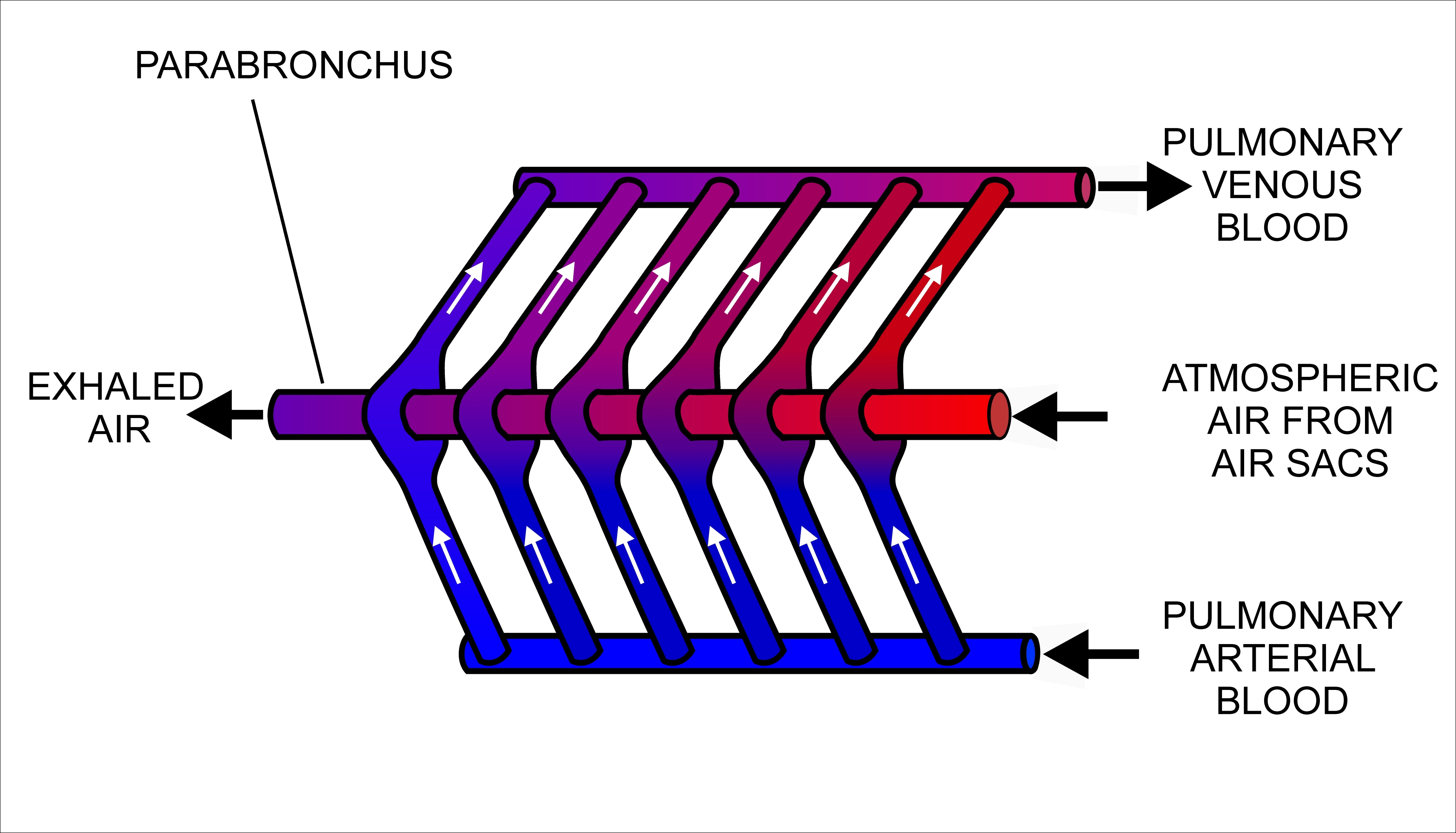
The cross-current respiratory gas exchanger in the lungs of birds. Air is forced from the air sacs unidirectionally (from right to left in the diagram) through the parabronchi. The pulmonary capillaries surround the parabronchi in the manner shown (blood flowing from below the parabronchus to above it in the diagram). Blood or air with a high oxygen content is shown in red; oxygen-poor air or blood is shown in various shades of purple-blue.

The blood flow through the bird lung is at right angles to the flow of air through the parabronchi, forming a cross-current flow exchange system (see illustration on the left). The partial pressure of oxygen in the parabronchi declines along their lengths as O_{2} diffuses into the blood. The blood capillaries leaving the exchanger near the entrance of airflow take up more O_{2} than do the capillaries leaving near the exit end of the parabronchi. When the contents of all capillaries mix, the final partial pressure of oxygen of the mixed pulmonary venous blood is higher than that of the exhaled air, but is nevertheless less than half that of the inhaled air, thus achieving roughly the same systemic arterial blood partial pressure of oxygen as mammals do with their bellows-type lungs.

The trachea is an area of dead space: the oxygen-poor air it contains at the end of exhalation is the first air to re-enter the posterior air sacs and lungs. In comparison to the mammalian respiratory tract, the dead space volume in a bird is, on average, 4.5 times greater than it is in mammals of the same size. Birds with long necks will inevitably have long tracheae, and must therefore take deeper breaths than mammals do to make allowances for their greater dead space volumes. In some birds (e.g. the whooper swan, Cygnus cygnus, the white spoonbill, Platalea leucorodia, the whooping crane, Grus americana, and the helmeted curassow, Pauxi pauxi) the trachea, which some cranes can be 1.5 m long, is coiled back and forth within the body, drastically increasing the dead space ventilation.

Air passes unidirectionally through the lungs during both exhalation and inspiration, causing, except for the oxygen-poor dead space air left in the trachea after exhalation and breathed in at the beginning of inhalation, little to no mixing of new oxygen-rich air with spent oxygen-poor air (as occurs in mammalian lungs), changing only (from oxygen-rich to oxygen-poor) as it moves (unidirectionally) through the parabronchi.

Avian lungs do not have alveoli as mammalian lungs do. Instead they contain millions of narrow passages known as parabronchi, connecting the dorsobronchi to the ventrobronchi at either ends of the lungs. Air flows anteriorly (caudal to cranial) through the parallel parabronchi. These parabronchi have honeycombed walls. The cells of the honeycomb are dead-end air vesicles, called atria, which project radially from the parabronchi. The atria are the site of gas exchange by simple diffusion. The blood flow around the parabronchi (and their atria), forms a cross-current gas exchanger (see diagram on the left).

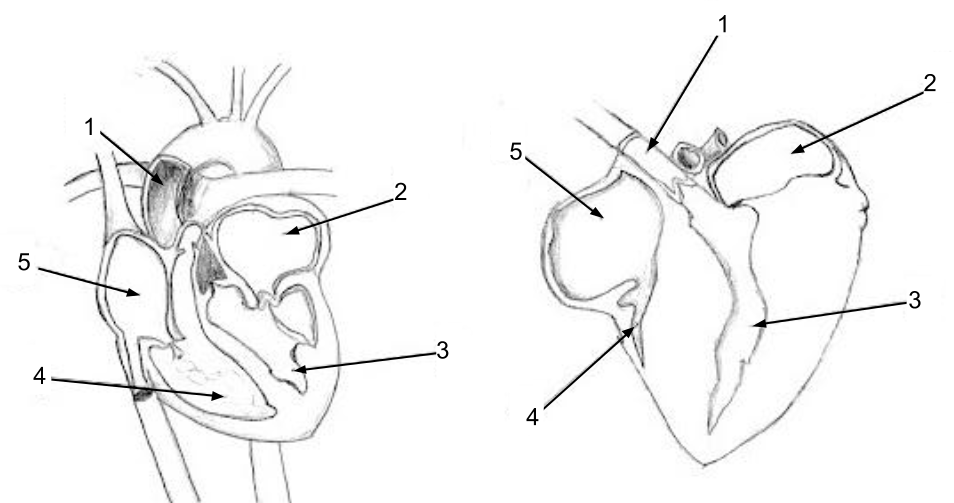
The human heart (left) and chicken heart (right) share many similar characteristics. Avian hearts pump faster than mammalian hearts. Due to the faster heart rate, the muscles surrounding the ventricles of the chicken heart are thicker. Both hearts are labeled with the following parts: 1. Ascending Aorta 2. Left Atrium 3. Left Ventricle 4. Right Ventricle 5. Right Atrium. In chickens and others birds, the superior cava is double.

All species of birds with the exception of the penguin, have a small region of their lungs devoted to "neopulmonic parabronchi". This unorganized network of microscopic tubes branches off from the posterior air sacs, and open haphazardly into both the dorso- and ventrobronchi, as well as directly into the intrapulmonary bronchi. Unlike the parabronchi, in which the air moves unidirectionally, the air flow in the neopulmonic parabronchi is bidirectional. The neopulmonic parabronchi never make up more than 25% of the total gas exchange surface of birds.

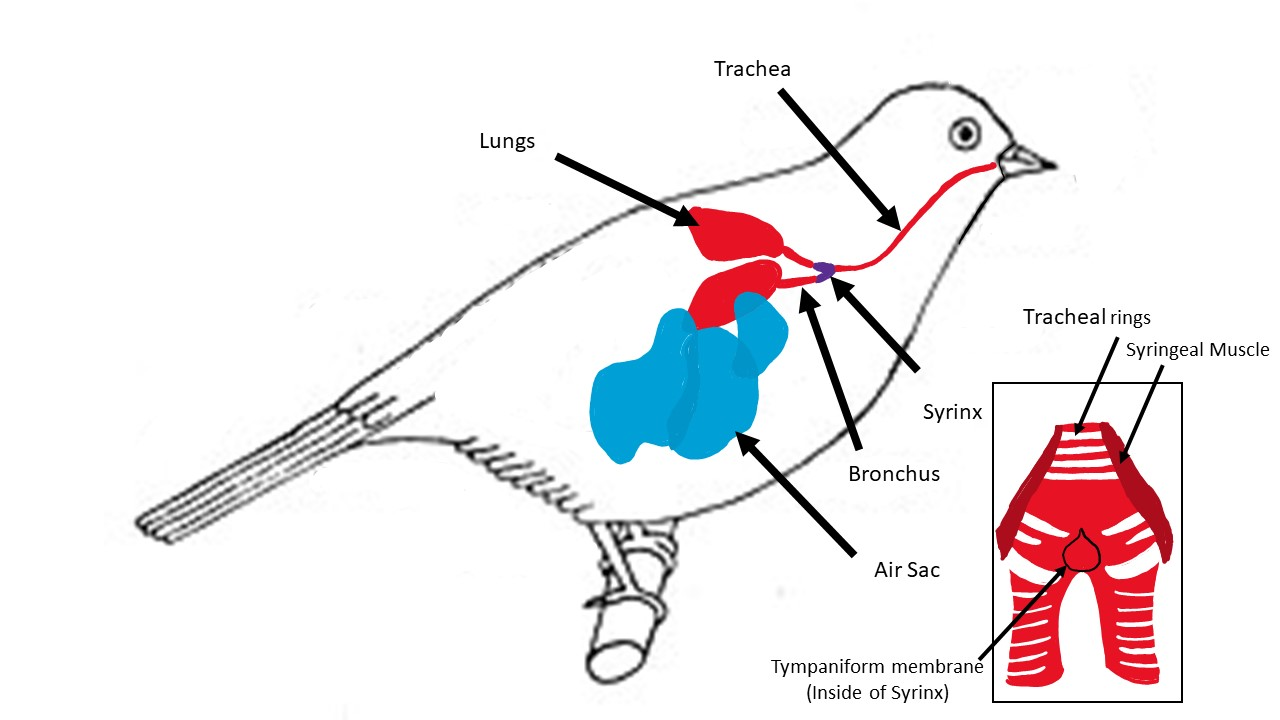
Vocal Bird anatomy: Birds produce sounds through the air that passes through the Syrinx, which is shown close up in the bottom right.

In order for birds to produce sound, they use an organ located above the lungs called the syrinx, which is composed of tracheal rings, syringeal muscles, Tympaniform membrane, and internal bony structures that contribute to the production of sound. Air then passes through this organ, resulting in the vocalization of birds. Sound can then be produced through the movement of the Tympaniform membrane. Pitch can also be changed by opening and closing of the Tympaniform membrane, allowing for higher and lower production of sound.

== Circulatory system ==
Birds have a four-chambered heart, in common with mammals, and some reptiles (mainly the Crocodilia). This adaptation allows for an efficient nutrient and oxygen transport throughout the body, providing birds with energy to fly and maintain high levels of activity. A ruby-throated hummingbird's heart beats up to 1,200 times per minute (about 20 beats per second).

== Digestive system ==
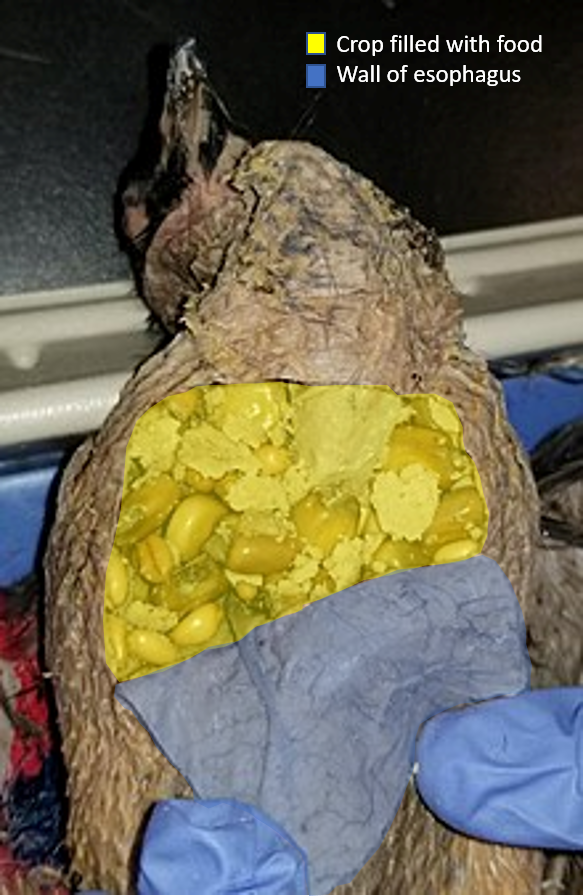
Pigeon crop containing ingested food particles is highlighted in yellow. The crop is an out-pouching of the esophagus and the wall of the esophagus is shown in blue.

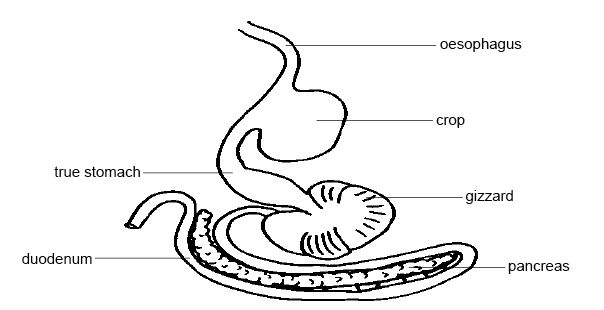
Simplified depiction of avian digestive system.

=== Crop ===
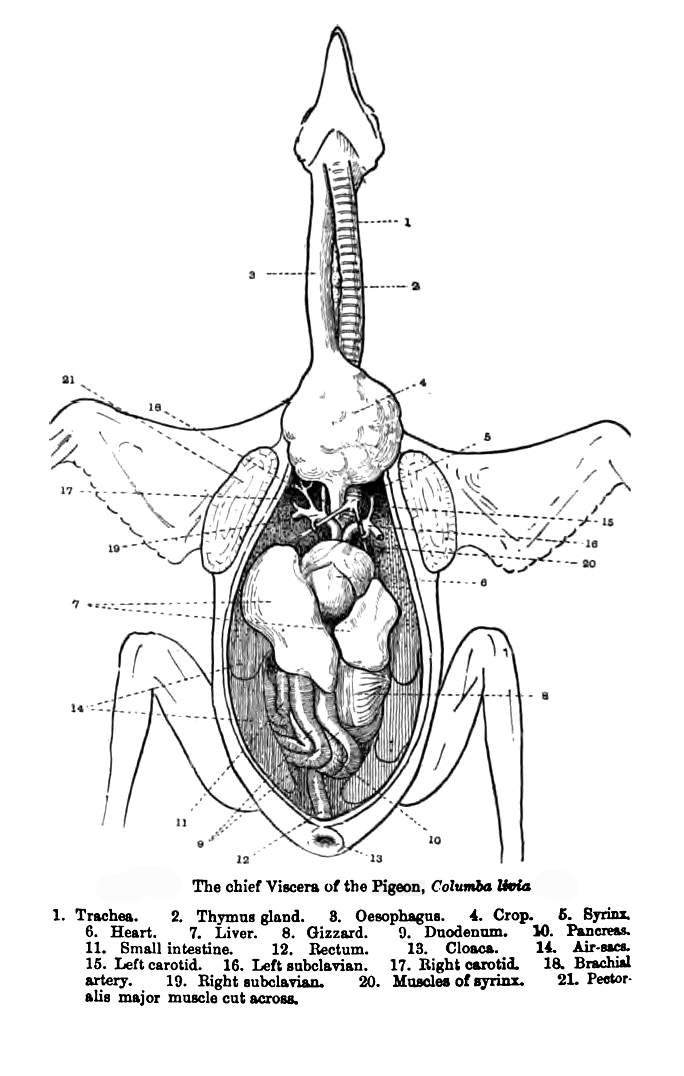
Alimentary canal of the bird exposed

Many birds possess a muscular pouch along the esophagus called a crop. The crop functions to both soften food and regulate its flow through the system by storing it temporarily. The size and shape of the crop is quite variable among the birds. Members of the family Columbidae, such as pigeons, produce a nutritious crop milk which is fed to their young by regurgitation.

=== Proventriculus ===
The avian stomach is composed of two organs, the proventriculus and the gizzard that work together during digestion. The proventriculus is a rod shaped tube, which is found between the esophagus and the gizzard, that secretes hydrochloric acid and pepsinogen into the digestive tract. The acid converts the inactive pepsinogen into the active proteolytic enzyme, pepsin, which breaks down specific peptide bonds found in proteins, to produce a set of peptides, which are amino acid chains that are shorter than the original dietary protein. The gastric juices (hydrochloric acid and pepsinogen) are mixed with the stomach contents through the muscular contractions of the gizzard.

=== Gizzard ===
The gizzard is composed of four muscular bands that rotate and crush food by shifting the food from one area to the next within the gizzard. The gizzard of some species of herbivorous birds, like turkey and quails, contains small pieces of grit or stone called gastroliths that are swallowed by the bird to aid in the grinding process, serving the function of teeth. The use of gizzard stones is a similarity found between birds and other dinosaurs, which left gastroliths as trace fossils.

=== Intestines ===
The partially digested and pulverized gizzard contents, now called a bolus, are passed into the intestine, where pancreatic and intestinal enzymes complete the digestion of the digestible food. The digestion products are then absorbed through the intestinal mucosa into the blood. The intestine ends via the large intestine in the vent or cloaca which serves as the common exit for renal and intestinal excrements as well as for the laying of eggs. However, unlike mammals, many birds do not excrete the bulky portions (roughage) of their undigested food (e.g. feathers, fur, bone fragments, and seed husks) via the cloaca, but regurgitate them as food pellets.

=== Drinking behaviour ===
There are three general ways in which birds drink: using gravity itself, sucking, and by using the tongue. Fluid is also obtained from food.

Most birds are unable to swallow by the "sucking" or "pumping" action of peristalsis in their esophagus (as humans do), and drink by repeatedly raising their heads after filling their mouths to allow the liquid to flow by gravity, a method usually described as "sipping" or "tipping up". The notable exception is the family of pigeons and doves, the Columbidae; in fact, according to Konrad Lorenz in 1939:

one recognizes the order by the single behavioral characteristic, namely that in drinking the water is pumped up by peristalsis of the esophagus which occurs without exception within the order. The only other group, however, which shows the same behavior, the Pteroclidae, is placed near the doves just by this doubtlessly very old characteristic.

Although this general rule still stands, since that time, observations have been made of a few exceptions in both directions.

In addition, specialized nectar feeders like sunbirds (Nectariniidae) and hummingbirds (Trochilidae) drink by using protrusible grooved or trough-like tongues, and parrots (Psittacidae) lap up water.

Many seabirds have glands near the eyes that allow them to drink seawater. Excess salt is eliminated from the nostrils. Many desert birds get the water that they need entirely from their food. The elimination of nitrogenous wastes as uric acid reduces the physiological demand for water, as uric acid is not very toxic and thus does not need to be diluted in as much water.

== Reproductive and urogenital systems ==
Diagram of a female chicken reproductive system A. Mature ovum, B. Infundibulum, C. Magnum, D. Isthmus, E. Uterus, F. Vagina, G. Cloaca, H. Large intestine, I. rudiment of right oviduct

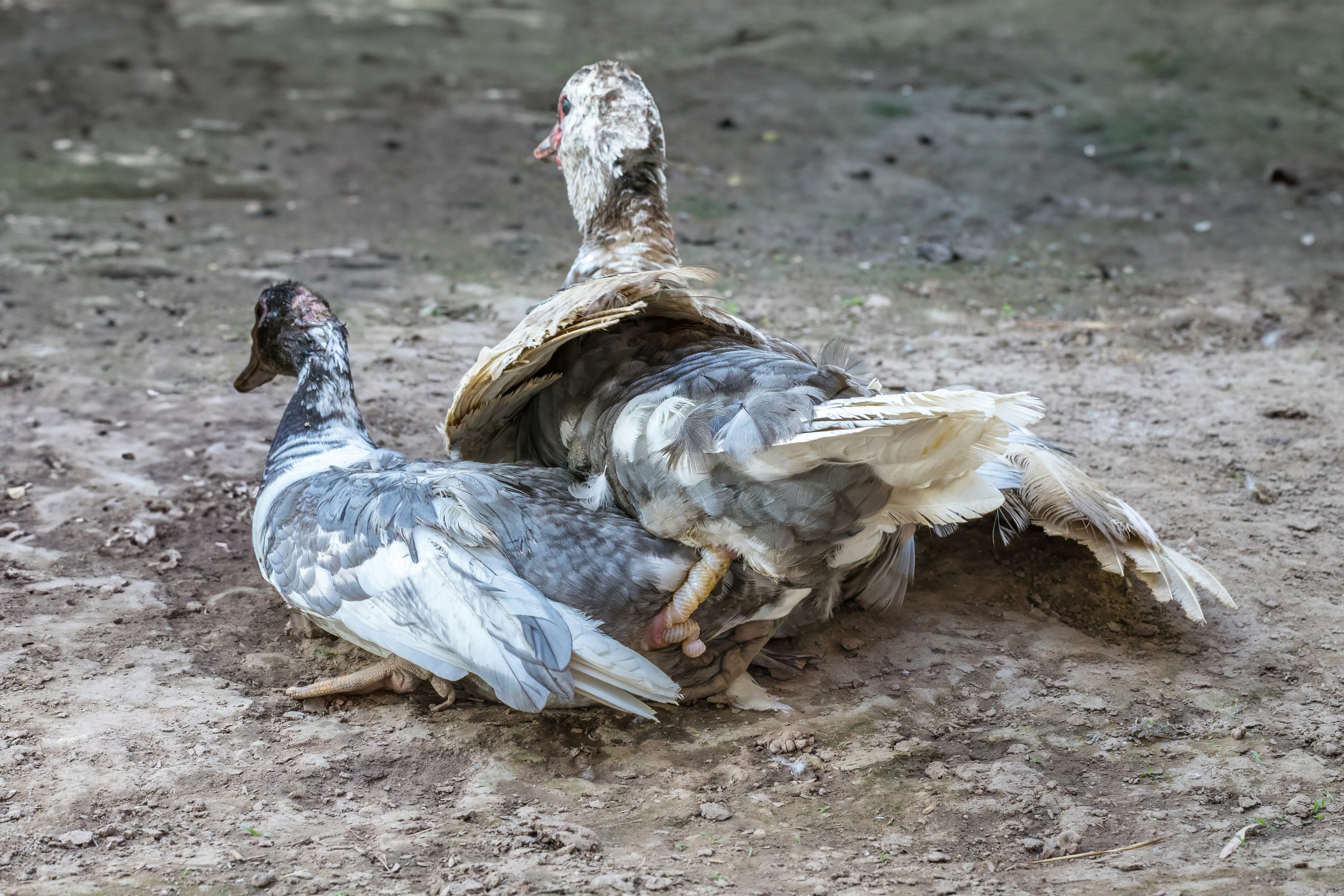
Copulating ducks showing a corkscrew penis inserted in a cloaca

Male birds have two testes which become hundreds of times larger during the breeding season to produce sperm. The testes in birds are generally asymmetric with most birds having a larger left testis. Female birds in most families have only one functional ovary (the left one), connected to an oviduct — although two ovaries are present in the embryonic stage of each female bird. Some species of birds have two functional ovaries, and the kiwis always retain both. Birds do not have male accessory glands.

Most male birds have no phallus. In the males of species without a phallus, sperm is stored in the seminal glomera within the cloacal protuberance prior to copulation. During copulation, the female moves her tail to the side and the male either mounts the female from behind or in front (as in the stitchbird), or moves very close to her. The cloacae then touch, so that the sperm can enter the female's reproductive tract. This can happen very fast, sometimes in less than half a second.

The sperm is stored in the female's sperm storage tubules for a period varying from a week to more than 100 days, depending on the species. Then, eggs will be fertilized individually as they leave the ovaries, before the shell is calcified in the oviduct. After the egg is laid by the female, the embryo continues to develop in the egg outside the female body.

Many waterfowl and some other birds, such as the ostrich and turkey, possess a phallus. This appears to be the ancestral condition among birds; most birds have lost the phallus. The length is thought to be related to sperm competition in species that usually mate many times in a breeding season; sperm deposited closer to the ovaries is more likely to achieve fertilization. The longer and more complicated phalli tend to occur in waterfowl whose females have unusual anatomical features of the vagina (such as dead end sacs and clockwise coils). These vaginal structures may be used to prevent penetration by the male phallus (which coils counter-clockwise). In these species, copulation is often violent and female co-operation is not required; the female ability to prevent fertilization may allow the female to choose the father for her offspring. When not copulating, the phallus is hidden within the proctodeum compartment within the cloaca, just inside the vent.

After the eggs hatch, parents provide varying degrees of care in terms of food and protection. Precocial birds can care for themselves independently within minutes of hatching; altricial hatchlings are helpless, blind, and naked, and require extended parental care. The chicks of many ground-nesting birds such as partridges and waders are often able to run virtually immediately after hatching; such birds are referred to as nidifugous. The young of hole-nesters, though, are often totally incapable of unassisted survival. The process whereby a chick acquires feathers until it can fly is called "fledging".

Some birds, such as pigeons, geese, and red-crowned cranes, remain with their mates for life and may produce offspring on a regular basis.

=== Kidney ===
Avian kidneys function in almost the same way as the more extensively studied mammalian kidney, but with a few important adaptations; while much of the anatomy remains unchanged in structure, some important adaptations have occurred during their evolution.

The three-sectioned kidneys are placed on the bilateral side of the vertebral column, and are connected to the lower gastrointestinal tract. Depending on the bird species, the cortex makes up around 71–80% of the kidney's mass, while the medulla is much smaller at about 5–15% of the mass. Blood vessels and other tubes make up the remaining mass.

Unique to birds is the presence of two different types of nephrons (the functional unit of the kidney): both reptilian-like nephrons located in the cortex; and mammalian-like nephrons located in the medulla. Reptilian nephrons are more abundant but lack the distinctive loops of Henle seen in mammals. Instead, the mammalian-like nephrons have a similar structure without the function that the loop of Henle serves. As opposed to mammalian kidneys, avian kidneys have a concentration gradient in the medullary cones that is created by salt rather than urea. Birds in water-abundant environments have more reptilian-like nephrons and vice versa.

The urine collected by the kidney is emptied into the cloaca through the ureters and then to the colon by reverse peristalsis.

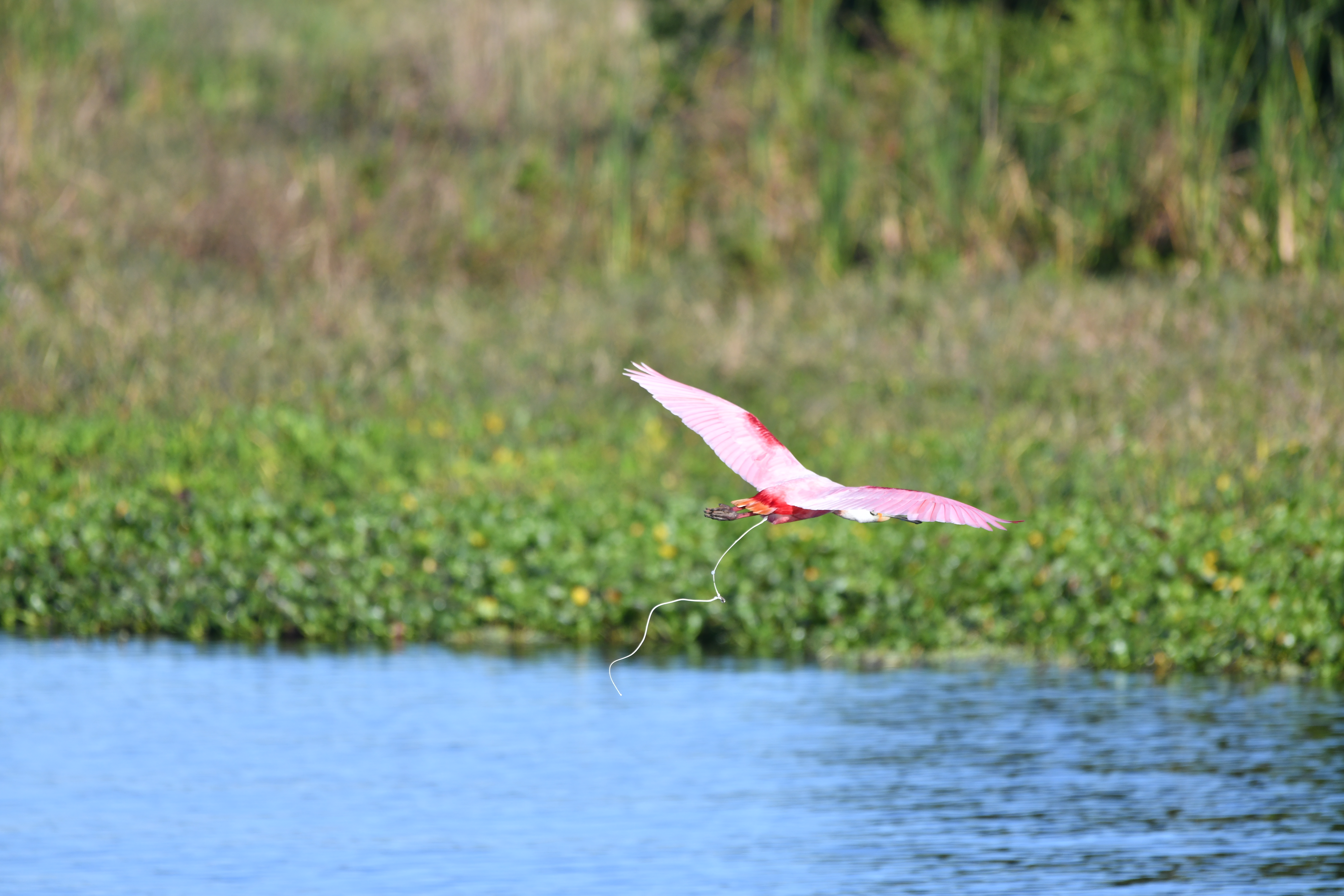
A Roseate spoonbill excreting urine in flight

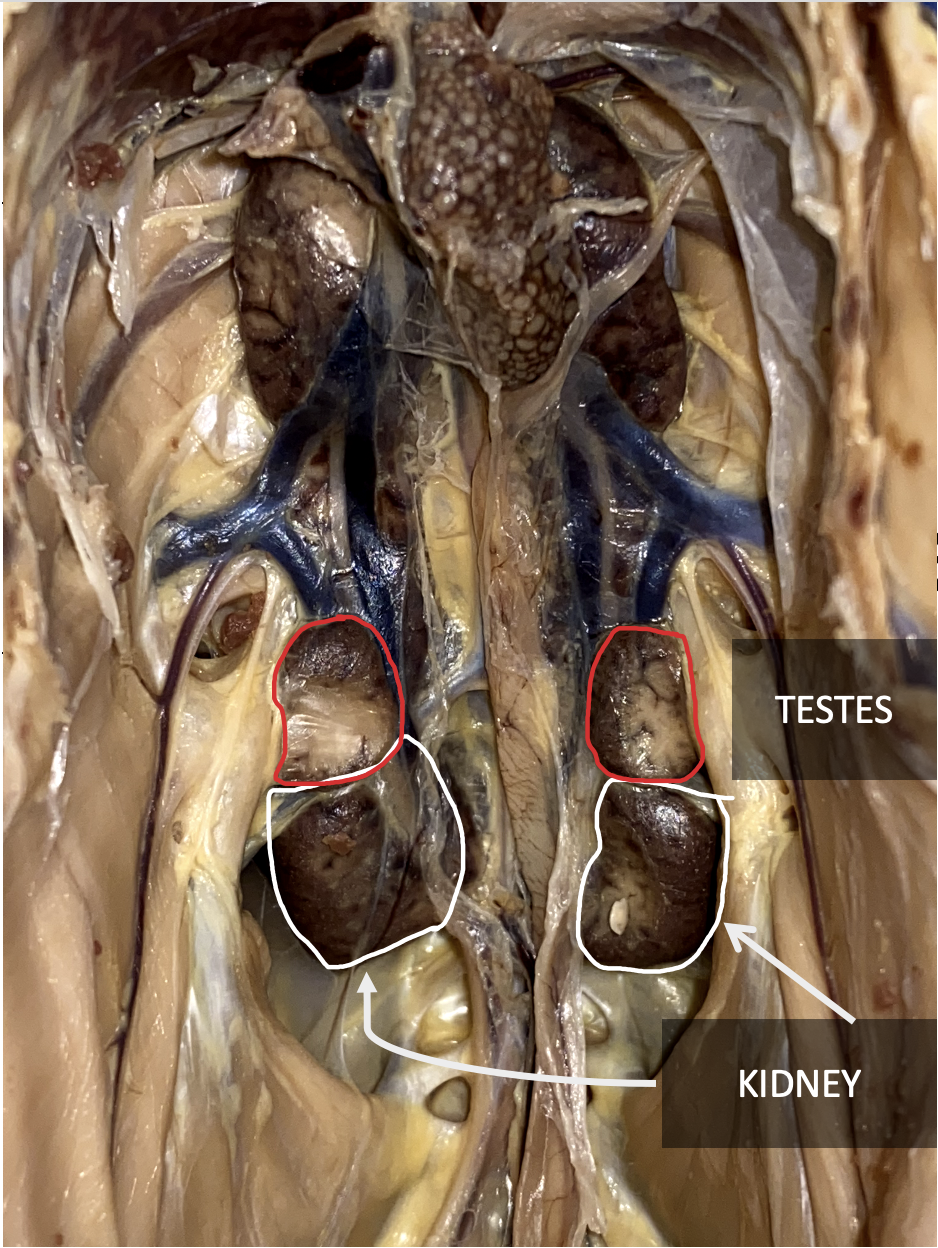
Chicken's kidneys visualized at the bottom of the abdomen cavity, along the medial spine of the chicken. Testes are labeled above the kidneys.

== Nervous system ==
=== Brain ===
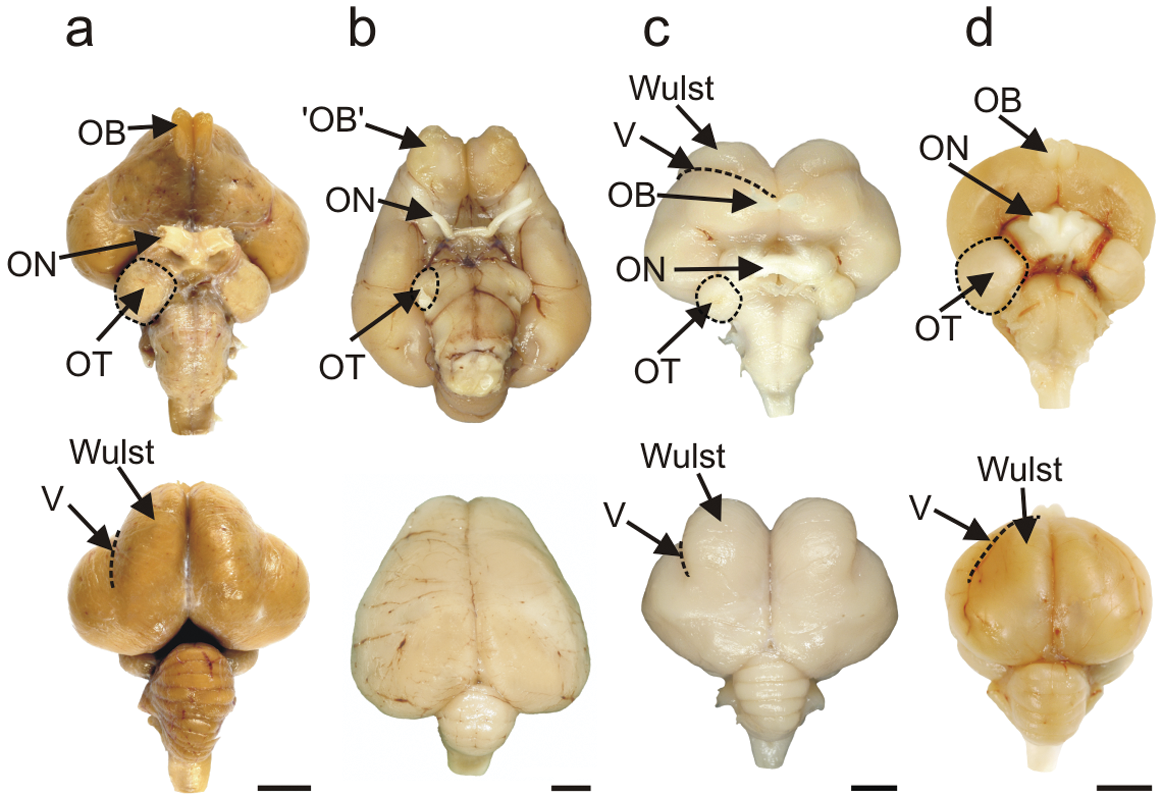
Brains of an emu, a kiwi, a barn owl, and a pigeon, with visual processing areas labelled

The avian brain is the central organ of the nervous system in birds. Birds possess large, complex brains, which process, integrate, and coordinate information received from the environment and make decisions on how to respond with the rest of the body. Like in all chordates, the avian brain is contained within the skull bones of the head.

The bird brain is divided into a number of sections, each with a different function. The cerebrum or telencephalon is divided into two hemispheres, and controls higher functions. The telencephalon is dominated by a large pallium, which corresponds to the mammalian cerebral cortex and is responsible for the cognitive functions of birds. The pallium is made up of several major structures: the hyperpallium, a dorsal bulge of the pallium found only in birds, as well as the nidopallium, mesopallium, and archipallium. The bird telencephalon has a nuclear structure, wherein neurons are distributed in three-dimensionally arranged clusters, with no large-scale separation of white matter and grey matter, though there exist layer-like and column-like connections. Structures in the pallium are associated with perception, learning, and cognition. Beneath the pallium are the two components of the subpallium, the striatum and pallidum. The subpallium connects different parts of the telencephalon and plays major roles in a number of critical behaviours. To the rear of the telencephalon are the thalamus, midbrain, and cerebellum. The hindbrain connects the rest of the brain to the spinal cord.

The size and structure of the avian brain enables prominent behaviours of birds such as flight and vocalization. Dedicated structures and pathways integrate the auditory and visual senses, strong in most species of birds, as well as the typically weaker olfactory and tactile senses. Social behaviour, widespread among birds, depends on the organisation and functions of the brain. Some birds exhibit strong abilities of cognition, enabled by the unique structure and physiology of the avian brain.

Birds have a large brain to body mass ratio. This is reflected in the advanced and complex bird intelligence.

=== Vision ===
Birds have acute eyesight—raptors (birds of prey) have vision eight times sharper than humans—thanks to higher densities of photoreceptors in the retina (up to 1,000,000 per square mm in Buteos, compared to 200,000 for humans), a high number of neurons in the optic nerves, a second set of eye muscles not found in other animals, and, in some cases, an indented fovea which magnifies the central part of the visual field. Many species, including hummingbirds and albatrosses, have two foveas in each eye. Many birds can detect polarised light.

=== Hearing ===
The avian ear is adapted to pick up on slight and rapid changes of pitch found in bird song. General avian tympanic membrane form is ovular and slightly conical. Morphological differences in the middle ear are observed between species. Ossicles within green finches, blackbirds, song thrushes, and house sparrows are proportionately shorter to those found in pheasants, Mallard ducks, and sea birds. In song birds, a syrinx allows the respective possessors to create intricate melodies and tones. The middle avian ear is made up of three semicircular canals, each ending in an ampulla and joining to connect with the macula sacculus and lagena, of which the cochlea, a straight short tube to the external ear, branches from.

=== Taste ===
Birds evolved from an ancestor that had lost the taste bud type called T1R2, which allows other animals, like alligators, to taste sweet. After many birds adapted to a diet with high sugar content, they modified their umami taste receptors (T1R1-T1R3) to also sense sweet tastes. TR2, used to detect bitter tastes, is reduced in birds.

== Immune system ==
The immune system of birds resembles that of other jawed vertebrates. Birds have both innate and adaptive immune systems. Birds are susceptible to tumours, immune deficiency and autoimmune diseases.

=== Bursa of Fabricius ===
==== Function ====
The bursa of Fabricius, also known as the cloacal bursa, is a lymphoid organ which aids in the production of B lymphocytes during humoral immunity. The bursa of Fabricius is present during juvenile stages but curls up. For example, the bursa is not visible after sexual maturity in different species of sparrow. For comparison, B lymphocytes in mammals are developed in the bone marrow.

==== Anatomy ====
The bursa of Fabricius is a circular pouch connected to the superior dorsal side of the cloaca. The bursa is composed of many folds, known as plica, which are lined by more than 10,000 follicles encompassed by connective tissue and surrounded by mesenchyme. Each follicle consists of a cortex that surrounds a medulla. The cortex houses the highly compacted B lymphocytes, whereas the medulla houses lymphocytes loosely. The medulla is separated from the lumen by the epithelium and this aids in the transport of epithelial cells into the lumen of the bursa. There are 150,000 B lymphocytes located around each follicle.

== Accessory glands in birds ==
=== Pancreas ===
The avian pancreas is a multifunctional organ with both exocrine and endocrine roles, fundamental to digestion and metabolism. Anatomically, it is suspended between the limbs of the duodenum and is highly lobular, connected to the intestine via ducts that deliver digestive enzymes aiding in small intestinal digestion.

==== Exocrine Function ====
The exocrine pancreas produces digestive juices containing enzymes critical for the breakdown of proteins, carbohydrates, and fats. These secretions are released into the duodenum and initiate further digestion of chyme that has already been processed by the proventriculus and gizzard.

==== Endocrine Function ====
The endocrine pancreas in birds occupies a relatively larger tissue mass than in mammals and includes four main types of cells organized in islets:

- A-cells: Produce glucagon, a potent catabolic hormone circulating at 6-8 times the levels found in mammals.
- B-cells: Produce insulin, which in birds is highly potent per unit weight compared to mammalian insulin, but glucose is not its primary trigger for release.
- D-cells: Produce somatostatin, which suppresses secretion of all islet hormones, modulating the insulin/glucagon (I/G) molar ratio.
- F-cells (PP-cells): Produce pancreatic polypeptide (PP), circulating at 20–40 times higher levels than in mammals, primarily inhibiting gastrointestinal motility and inducing satiety.

Interestingly, the I/G molar ratio is lower in birds than in mammals, reflecting a metabolism oriented towards continuous gluconeogenesis and lipid utilization rather than glucose storage. Birds maintain fasting glucose levels that are 150–300% higher than mammals, supported by high glucagon levels and a reliance on lipid metabolism, particularly during energetically demanding states like migration.

Surgical extirpation of the pancreas in birds leads to severe hypoglycemia, highlighting the life-preserving role of glucagon rather than insulin, contrary to mammals where insulin deficiency leads to hyperglycemia.

== See also ==
- List of terms used in bird topography
