= Convair Submersible Seaplane =

American submarine flying boat project

Convair Submersible Seaplane (artist's conception)

The Convair Submersible Seaplane (or "Subplane") was a United States Navy project to produce a seaplane which could travel underwater as well as fly.

== History ==
Between 1962 and 1964, the Navy granted a contract to Convair, a military aircraft arm of General Dynamics, to design and develop the vehicle, intended for anti-submarine warfare. The craft's operational deployment would be to scout for enemy submarines from the air and, if any were detected, land on the water, submerge, and engage them underwater. One envisioned deployment was to attack shipping in the Soviet Union's marginal seas – the Baltic, Black, and Caspian seas.

The specifications were for a craft capable of operating in sea state 2 (waves of maximum height of 1.8 feet (0.55 m)), a cruising speed in flight of up to 220 miles per hour (350 km/h), and an underwater performance of up to 10 knots (19 km/h), a depth of down to 75 feet (23 m), and an endurance of 10 hours.

Convair's design was for a narrow-hulled flying boat (rather than a floatplane). The craft was to be powered by three turbojets, carry a crew of two, and carry a payload of 500 to 1,500 pounds (227 to 680 kilograms). The craft was to have used ballast tanks to dive and surface, much as a conventional submarine does, located in the wings and fuselage. The weaponry was to be torpedoes or mines. For undersea operations, the turbojets would be sealed water-tight, and underwater propulsion would be provided by a battery-powered electric motor driving a propeller.

Convair made detailed designs and built scale models which were tested, and averred that the craft would work, but the Aircraft did not get beyond that stage and was cancelled by Congress in 1965 or 1966.

== See also ==
- Flying submarine
