= Flying submarine =

Seaplane that can dive underwater

Ushakov's Flying Submarine

A flying submarine, submersible aircraft or aerosub is a combination of a seaplane and a submarine. It is supposed to be able both to fly and to travel under water. Taking-off from the surface of water is also intended.

Since the requirements for designing a submarine are practically opposed to those of an airplane, the performance expected from such a construction is usually rather moderate.

== History ==
=== United Kingdom ===
As early as 1920, the British trade journal, "Flying", reported conversations between the First Sea Lord and other military leaders and one of the principal aircraft manufacturers concerning a flying submarine (or submersible seaplane). The all-metal craft, its hypothetical design illustrated in the article, was to be a twin-propeller airplane with retractable wings and a hermetically sealed fuselage. There was, however, apparently no further development of the project.

=== Soviet Union ===
In 1934, a Soviet engineering student, Boris Ushakov, proposed a design for a submersible aircraft that would scout for ships and then submerge itself in order to ambush them. The design had three engines, conning tower, and a periscope, and could fire torpedoes (of which it carried two). It would submerge itself by flooding its fuselage and would use electrical power to propel itself when underwater. The craft would take off and land like a normal seaplane. However, the craft was viewed as being too heavy by the Soviets to be useful.

=== United States ===
In 1961 Donald Reid designed and built a single-seat craft (32.83 ft or 10 m length) capable of flight and underwater movement, the Reid Flying Submarine 1 (RFS-1). A 65 hp (48 kW) engine mounted on a pylon provided propulsion for flight; a 750 W (1 hp) electric motor in the tail provided underwater propulsion. The pilot used an aqualung for breathing underwater. The first full-cycle flight [underwater at 6.5 feet (2 m) depth, airborne at 33 ft (10 m) altitude] was demonstrated on 9 June 1964. Reid, his craft, and his son (the test pilot) appeared on the U.S. game show "I've Got A Secret" on March 15, 1965.

In the mid 1960s, the Navy let a contract to Convair to design a submersible airplane. The project – called the Convair Submersible Seaplane – reached the stage of detailed design and models, but was then cancelled by Congress.

In 2008, the U.S. Defense Advanced Research Projects Agency announced that it was preparing to issue contracts for a submersible aircraft.

In order for the DARPA craft to be propelled underwater, it has been suggested that high-energy batteries could be used to drive underwater motors. However, one problem identified with this proposal was that the batteries required to achieve DARPA's specifications would make the vehicle too heavy to fly. A suggested solution was using a ten-metre tall snorkel to supply air to a more conventional petrol turbine engine, although this would limit how far the craft could dive.

Another project involved the Lockheed Martin Cormorant drone aircraft. It would be launched from submarines, replacing the launch tubes of several cruise missiles. To reduce the risk of detection during launch, the drone would first be released from the submarine, which would then sail away. The drone would use compressed gas to push it to the surface, then it would use rocket motors to launch before using a jet engine when in the air. In order to return to the submarine, the drone would land on the ocean surface via parachute and be recovered by a swimming drone. The Cormorant was cancelled in 2008 due to budget cuts.

Some submersible aircraft proposals have involved using jet engines in a dual role, both propelling the vehicle in the air using conventional combustion and providing thrust underwater by being spun via an electric motor; some researchers have proposed using turboshaft engines to get the best efficiency and performance in both air and underwater environments. To prevent salt water from prematurely entering the engines when the aircraft is not submerged, the engines could be mounted on the craft's dorsal surface and to the rear. However, one issue is that because jet engines run at several hundred degrees when in air, they could not immediately transition underwater, as being exposed to seawater would subject them to extreme temperature change which would damage them, requiring the aircraft wait for several hours on the surface to cool its engines to submerge, thus any such configuration would require a novel cooling system in order to make a faster transition.

== See also ==
- Diving bird
- Submarine aircraft carrier
