= Furcula =

Forked bone found in birds and other dinosaurs; fusion of the two clavicles

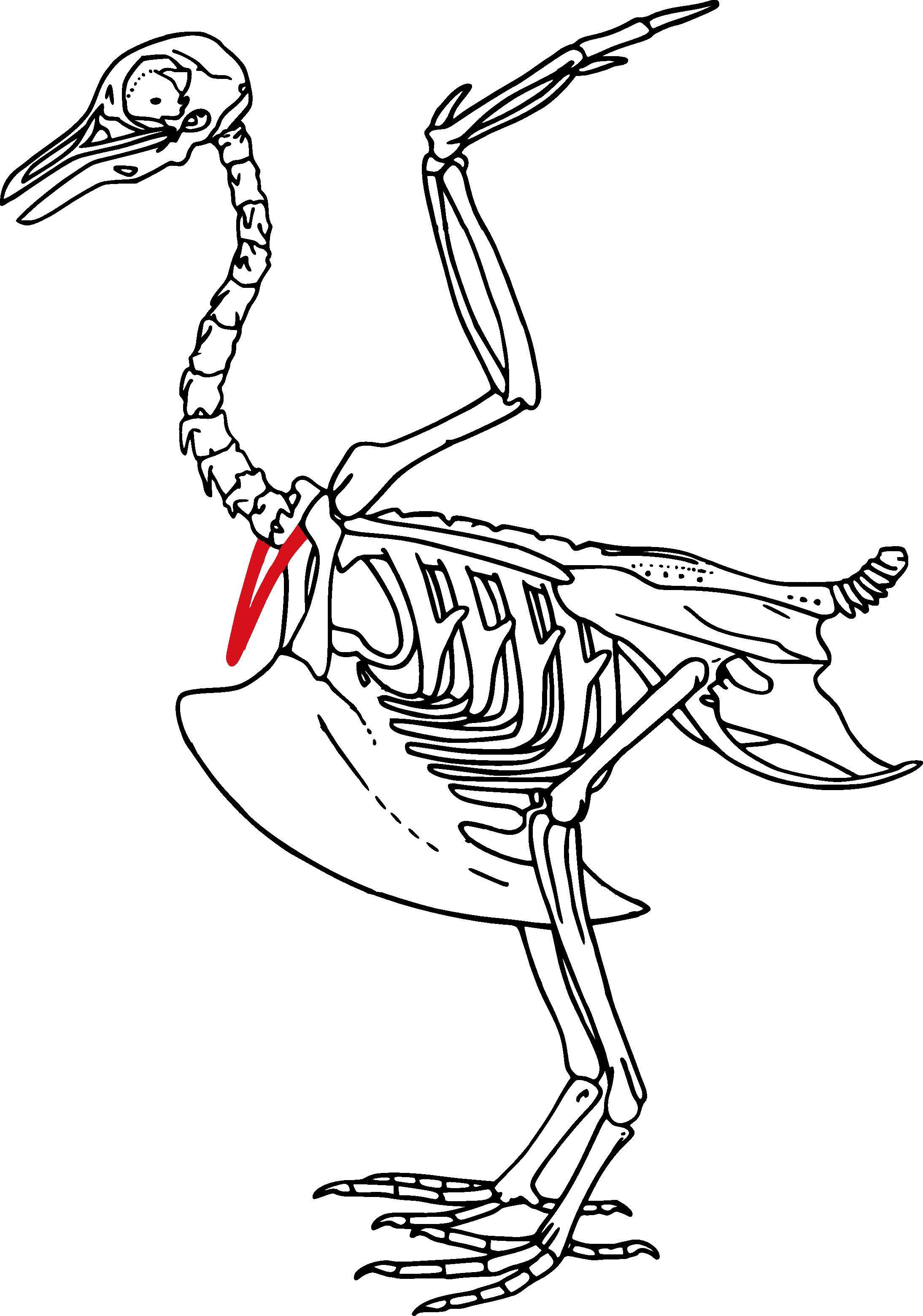
This stylised bird skeleton highlights the furcula

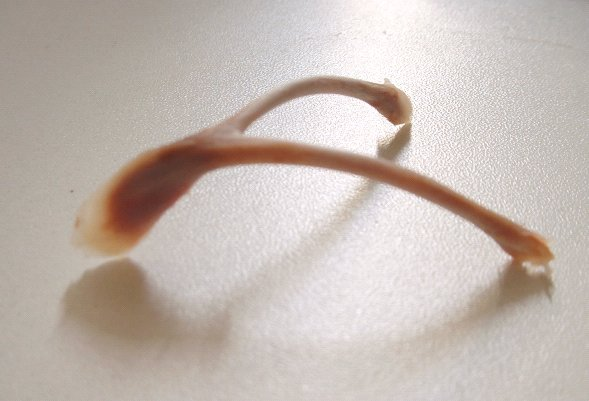
Wishbone of a chicken

The furcula (Latin for "little fork"; pl.: furculae) (Note: In general the suffix -la represents a diminutive form of the original. For example novella is a short novel.) or wishbone is a forked bone found in most birds and some species of non-avian dinosaurs, and is either an interclavicle or formed by the fusion of the two clavicles. In birds, its primary function is in strengthening the thoracic skeleton to withstand the rigors of flight.

== In birds ==
The furcula works as a strut between a bird's shoulders, and articulates to each of the bird's scapulae. In conjunction with the coracoid and the scapula, it forms a unique structure called the triosseal canal, which houses a strong tendon that connects the supracoracoideus muscles to the humerus. This system is responsible for lifting the wings during the recovery stroke.

As the thorax is compressed by the flight muscles during downstroke, the upper ends of the furcula spread apart, expanding by as much as 50% of its resting width, and then contracts. X-ray films of starlings in flight have shown that in addition to strengthening the thorax, the furcula acts like a spring in the pectoral girdle during flight. It expands when the wings are pulled downward and snaps back as they are raised. In this action, the furcula stores some of the energy generated by contraction in the breast muscles, expanding the shoulders laterally, and then releasing the energy during upstroke as the furcula snaps back to the normal position. This, in turn, draws the shoulders toward the midline of the body. While the starling has a moderately large and strong furcula for a bird of its size, there are many species where the furcula is completely absent, for instance scrubbirds, some toucans, and New World barbets, some owls, some parrots, turacos, and mesites. These birds are still fully capable of flying. They also have close relatives where the furcula is vestigial, reduced to a thin strap of ossified ligament, seemingly purposeless. Other species have evolved the furcula in the opposite direction, so that it has increased in size and become too stiff or massive to act as a spring. In strong flyers like cranes and falcons, the arms of the furcula are large, hollow and quite rigid.

In birds, the furcula also may aid in respiration by helping to pump air through the air sacs.

== In other animals ==
Several groups of theropod dinosaurs have also been found with furculae, including dromaeosaurids, oviraptorids, tyrannosaurids, troodontids, spinosaurids, coelophysids, and allosauroids.

Seeing the occurrence in diplodocid dinosaurs of interclavicles, Tschopp and Mateus (2013) proposed that the furcula is a transformed and divided interclavicle, rather than a fused clavicle.

== In folklore ==
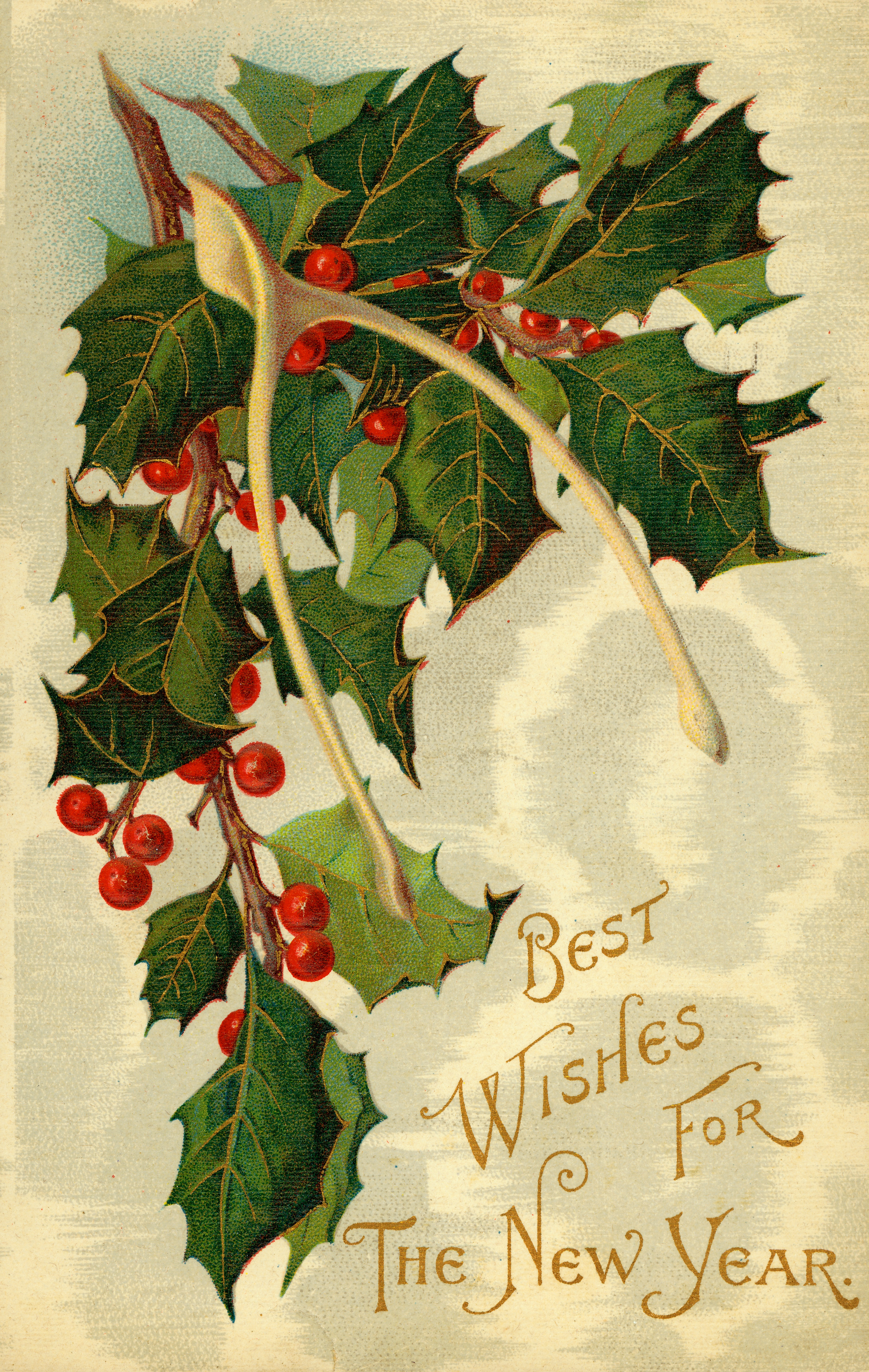
New Year postcard from around 1909 featuring a wishbone as a lucky symbol

Superstitions surrounding divination by means of a goose's wishbone go back to at least the late medieval period. Johannes Hartlieb in 1455 recorded the divination of weather by means of a goose's wishbone: "When the goose has been eaten on St. Martin's Day or Night, the oldest and most sagacious keeps the breast-bone and allowing it to dry until the morning examines it all around, in front, behind and in the middle. Thereby they divine whether the winter will be severe or mild, dry or wet, and are so confident in their prediction that they will wager their goods and chattels on its accuracy." Hartlieb wrote of a military officer: "This valiant man, this Christian Captain drew forth out of his doublet that heretical object of superstition, the goose-bone, and showed me that after Candlemas an exceeding severe frost should occur, and could not fail." According to the officer, "The Teutonic knights in Prussia waged all their wars by the goose-bone; and as the goose-bone predicted so did they order their two campaigns, one in summer and one in winter."

The custom of two persons pulling on the bone with the one receiving the larger part making a wish developed in the early 17th century. In some family traditions, the one receiving the smaller part made the wish. At that time, the name of the bone was merrythought. The name wishbone in reference to this custom is recorded from 1860.

== See also ==
- Bird anatomy – Physiological structure of birds' bodies
