= Diving bird =

Birds which plunge into water to catch fish or other food

Diving birds are birds which plunge into the water to catch fish or other prey.

== Description ==
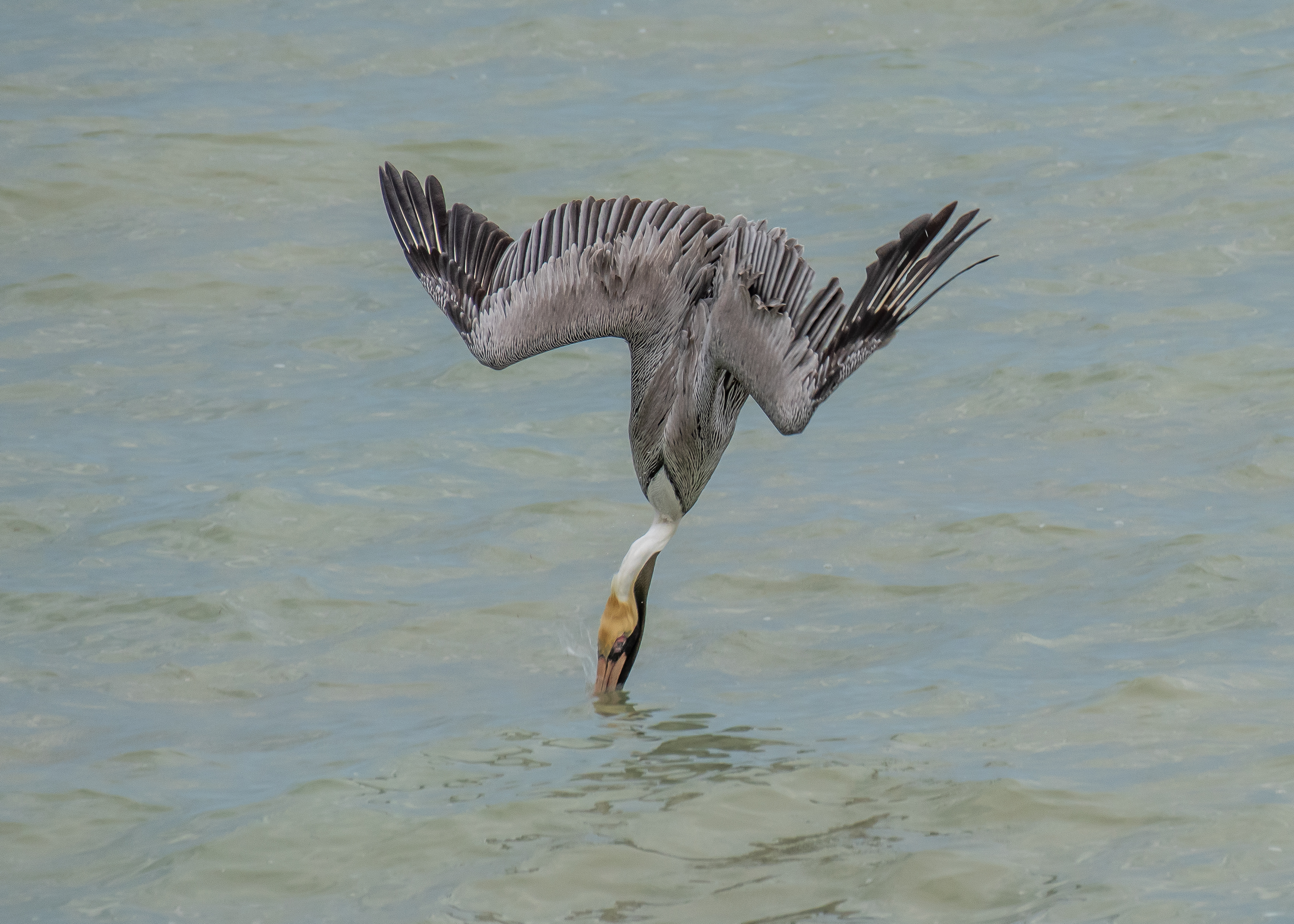
Brown pelican (Pelecanus occidentalis) diving into the water while hunting

Such birds may enter the water from flight, such as pelicans, gannets and tropicbirds; or they may dive from the surface of the water, such as the diving ducks, cormorants and penguins. It is theorized that they evolved from birds already adapted for swimming that were equipped with such adaptations as lobed or webbed feet for propulsion.

== Foot-propelled diving birds ==
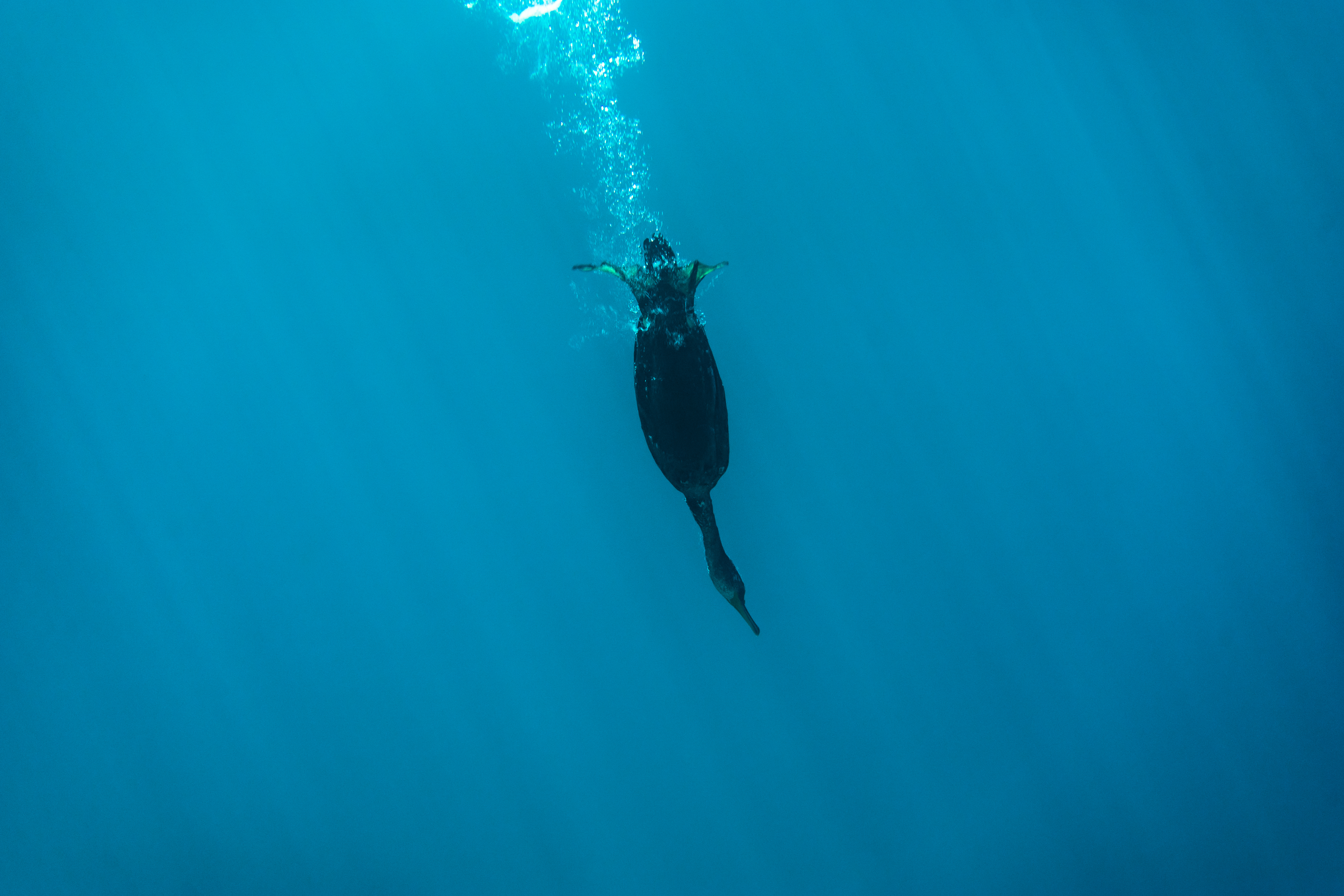
Great cormorant (Phalacrocorax carbo) diving

Some diving birds, for example the extinct Hesperornithes of the Cretaceous Period, propelled themselves with their feet. They were large, streamlined, and flightless birds with teeth for grasping slippery prey. Today, cormorants (family Phalacrocoracidae), loons (Gaviidae), and grebes (Podicipedidae) are the major groups of foot-propelled diving birds.

== Wing-propelled diving birds ==
Other diving birds are wing-propelled; penguins (Sphenisciformes), dippers (Cinclus), auks (Alcidae) and diving petrels (Pelecanoides). Also the extinct forms Plotopteridae and Mancallinae appears to have used their wings to propel themselves when diving.

== Plunge-diving birds ==
Plunge-diving is a special form of foraging that involves a transition from air to water. Plunge-diving birds are notable for their beaks, necks, and morphing wings. Plunge-diving birds generally have a higher beak angle ratio than others. Beak angle ratio is defined as the top angle divided by the side angle. When the top and side angles are similar together, high beak angle ratios result, while when the difference is greater, low beak angle ratios result. Plunge-diving birds' foraging behavior also affects the evolution of rhamphotheca and skeletal beak shape. Plunge-diving birds have narrower and thinner rhamphotheca, resulting in different beak shapes.

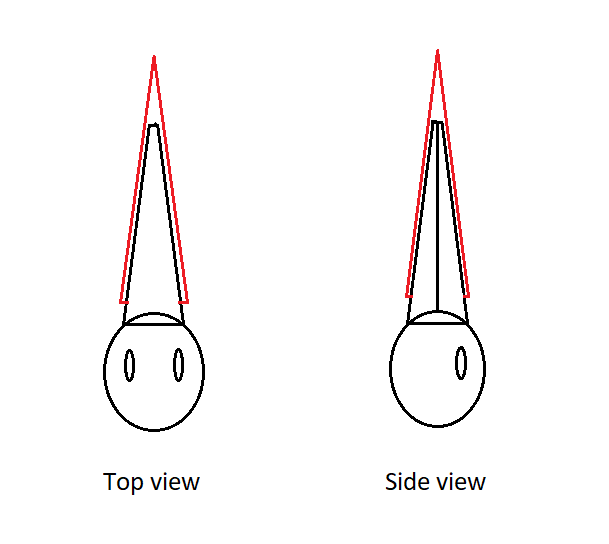
Beak angle

The neck of plunge-diving birds is also unique. Plunge-diving birds can dive from heights up to 45 m and reaching speed up to 24 m/s without injury. Their neck plays a big role when plunge-diving. Their neck muscle will contract during the impact process, and the tendons will apply tension to the bones as a stabilizing force during the dive. This allows them to be able to plunge-dive safely, having deeper dives and thereby increasing the volume of water accessible to the birds while surprising the prey. Plunge-diving birds dive less often than those who dive from the water's surface due to the mechanics of the dive.

Another unique feature of plunge-diving birds are their morphing wings. The morphing wing has the ability to change the wingspan in flight and adapt to various aerodynamic requirements or flight conditions. Different shapes of a bird's wing are important in determining the flight capabilities; they can affect aerodynamic performance and maneuverability. In the fully open condition, the morphing wing reaches the maximum surface area and has a 32% higher lift coefficient which to achieve high maneuverability at low speed. In the fully closed condition, the morphing wing would minimize the surface area and reduce the drag coefficient by 29.3%, from 0.027 to 0.021, to achieve high-speed flight.

== See also ==
- Flying submarine – Seaplane that can dive underwater
- Physiology of underwater diving – Adaptations of marine vertebrates to diving
