= Synsacrum =

Skeletal structure in some animals

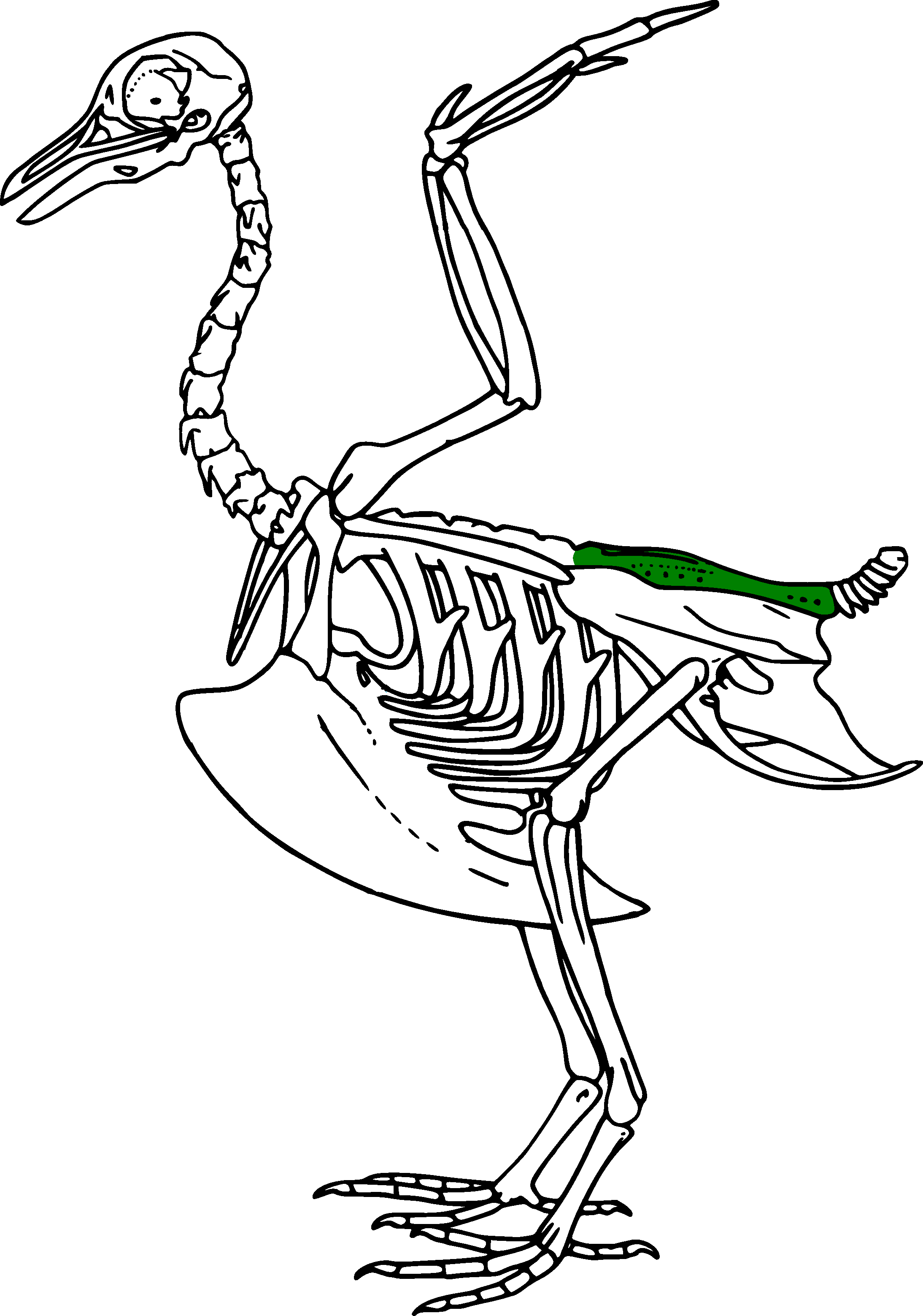
This stylised bird skeleton highlights the synsacrum

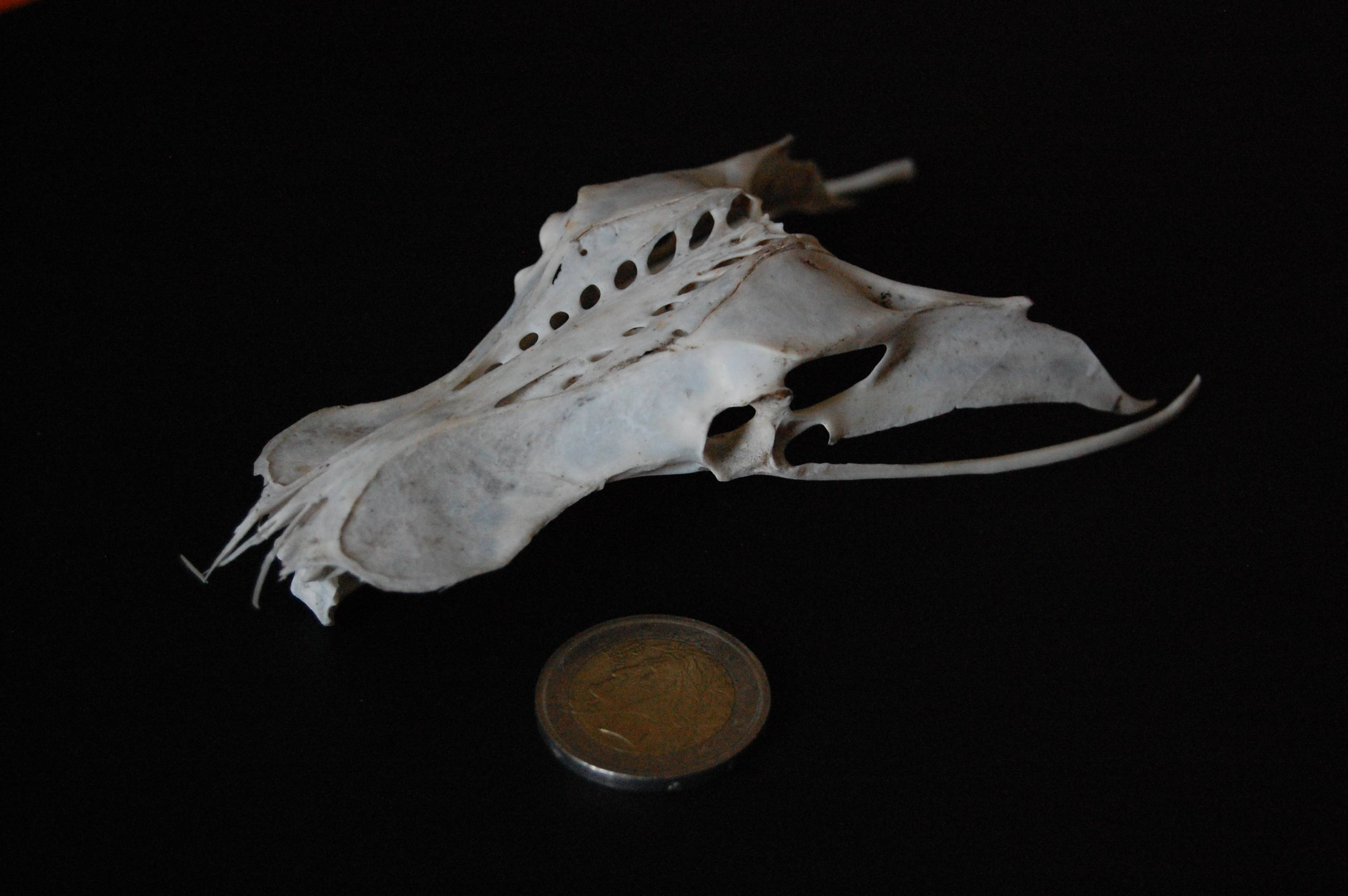
Pelvis of a Gull; formed by the Synsacrum (fused vertebrae placed centrally) and the two innominate bones either side

The synsacrum is a skeletal structure of birds and other dinosaurs, pterosaurs, as well as xenarthran mammals, in which the sacrum is extended by incorporation of additional fused or partially fused caudal or lumbar vertebrae. Some posterior thoracic vertebrae, the lumbar, sacral and a few anterior caudal vertebrae are fused to form a complex bone called synsacrum. In birds, inate bones are fused with the synsacrum to a greater or lesser extent, according to species, forming an avian pelvis. This forms a more extensive rigid structure than the pelvis of a mammal, fulfilling requirements for flight, locomotion and respiration. Posterior to the bird synsacrum there are a few free caudal vertebrae, the last of which is the pygostyle to which the long, stiff tail feathers are attached. The central section of the synsacrum is swollen to accommodate the glycogen body, an organ whose function is as yet unclear but which may be associated with balance.

In terms of external morphology, the synsacrum corresponds to the rump.
