= Megapaloelodus =

Megapaloelodus Temporal range: Late Oligocene–Early Pliocene

Scientific classification
- Kingdom: Animalia
- Phylum: Chordata
- Class: Aves
- Order: Phoenicopteriformes
- Family: †Palaelodidae
- Genus: †Megapaloelodus; A. H. Miller 1944

Species
- M. connectens Miller, 1944 (type); M. goliath Milne-Edwards, 1863; M. opsigonus Brodkorb, 1961; M. peiranoi Agnolin, 2009

Synonyms
- Megapalaelodus Wetmore 1951

Extinct genus of birds

Megapaloelodus is an extinct genus of stem flamingo of the family Palaelodidae. Megapaloelodus is primarily known from Miocene America, from South Dakota and Oregon in the north to Argentina in the south, but the species Megapaloelodus goliath was found in Europe. Additionally, one unnamed species was discovered in Miocene sediments from Namibia. Due to a lack of skull material, little can be said about the ecology of Megapaloelodus. Species of this genus are typically larger than those of Palaelodus and appear to have inhabited similar brackish lake environments. Additionally, they may have been capable of "locking" their legs in a standing position.

== History and naming ==
Megapaloelodus was named by American Alden H. Miller in 1944 on the basis of a fossil femur and tarsometatarsus collected from the lower Miocene Rosebud Formation of South Dakota. Recognizing similarities to fossils of Palaelodus, Miller described the material as a new genus of phoenicopteriform he named Megapaloelodus. Initially, Miller was under the impression that Megapaloelodus was a missing link between the basal Palaelodus and derived flamingos. In 1950 Loye H. Miller described the fragment of a tibiotarsus and an ulna from the late Miocene of California, also referring it to M. connectens. Miller notes that the California bones presents a sizable gap in both space and time while also not overlapping with any of the type material established six years prior. However, in the description he refers to the axiom "Things that differ in the same way from the same thing do not differ from each other." Through this he reasoned that, as the Californian fossil differs from Palaelodus in similar ways as the fossils from South Dakota, they could have belonged to the same species. Although this conclusion was acknowledged as being tentative, Miller further explained that it seemed more reasonable than to establish a new species on such fragmentary remains. In addition to further finds from California, a second species was described from Juntura, Oregon by Pierce Brodkorb, M. opsigonus. This species may have also occurred further south in Mexico. In 1983 Jacques Cheneval published a major revision of the palaelodids of Saint-Gérand-le-Puy. Besides agreeing with prior studies that synonymized many of the European species, he also transferred Palaelodus goliath to the genus Megapaloelodus. Czech paleontologist Jiří Mlíkovský disagreed with this assessment in 2002 and instead suggested that Megapaloelodus should be synonymized with Palaelodus. However, this taxonomic treatment of the genus as a whole has been met with criticism and is considered premature by other authors. In 2009 several specimens from Argentina previously only identified as an indetermined phoenicopterid were described as the species Megapaloelodus peiranoi.

The name Megapaloelodus combines the Ancient Greek word "mega" meaning "great" with a misspelling of the name Palaelodus, roughly translating to "ancient inhabitant of marshes", after the closely related genus primarily known from European deposits. The name was chosen to reflect the fact that the first discovered Megapaloelodus remains, belonging to M. connectens, appeared to have been larger than the already big Palaelodus goliath. This is rendered somewhat ironic as subsequent research has placed Palaelodus goliath in Megapaloelodus as well.

== Species ==
- M. connectens

The type species of Megapaloelodus, M. connectens, was first described from the late Arikareean Rosebud Formation of South Dakota. Later fossil discoveries also suggested its presence in the late Miocene Barstow Formation of San Bernardino County, California. The species name connectens was chosen by Alden H. Miller in the belief that this species bridged the gap between Palaelodus and extant flamingos.

- M. goliath

It is the earliest representative of Megapaloelodus, living from the Late Oligocene to the Middle Miocene, and is the only named species outside of the Americas. It was described based on several remains from France, with more material being later identified from Germany. While it was initially described as a species of Palaelodus, it was later transferred to Megapalaelodus by Cheneval. This has been called into question however, with some researchers arguing that the referral is largely dependent on the animal's size.

- M. opsigonus

A later species, M. opsigonus, was found in the Pliocene Juntura Formation at Juntura, Oregon. Brodkorb described the species as being smaller than Megapaloelodus goliath and Palaelodus crassipess (at times considered to simply be a large Palaelodus ambiguus), but larger than the other Palaelodus species. Hildegarde Howard also tentatively assigned material from the Miocene to Pliocene Almejas Formation of Cedros Island (Baja California) to this species. The species name means "born in a later age" in reference to its appearance during the Pliocene.

- M. peiranoi

The most recently described species, M. peiranoi was discovered in the strata of the Late Miocene Andalhualá Formation of Catamarca, Argentina. The holotype consists of a coracoid, sacrum and multiple wing bones, with a variety of other bones referred to the species as well. Unlike Palaelodus and modern flamingos, the forearm of M. peiranoi appears to have been short and robust rather than elongated. The notarium meanwhile appears to have been more similar to the basal Juncitarsus than to other phoenicopterids. Agnolin proposes that M. peiranoi may have been one of the more basal species of Megapaloelodus. It was named after Abel Peirano, a paleontologist who initially found and recovered the bones of this species.

Various scant remains possibly belonging to Megapaloelodus are also known from across America. For instance, some remains were found in the Sharktooth Hill Bonebed of Kern County (California), while others were discovered in the Ituzaingó Formation of Argentina prior to the description of P. peiranoi. One possible species of Megapaloelodus might have even been present in the Northern Sperrgebiet of Namibia during the Early Miocene. However this record is based on a partial humerus, which is not known from any other Megapaloelodus species. Subsequently, this assignment was made based on the fossils great size.

== Description ==
In many regards the bones of Megapaloelodus closely resembles those of Palaelodus. Both genera for instance share many characteristics of the tibiotarsus. Both have noticeable furrows along the edge of the pons supratendinous and lack the pits on the cranial surface that are noted for P. kurochkini (which may present a distinct genus of palaelodid). Megapaloelodus differs from its relatives through the pronounced tubercle located on the trochlea that articulates with the carpal bones, this tubercle is present as a rounded point that is located on the upper rim of the bone. The articulation point between the coracoid and the clavicle overhangs two distinct pits that are much shallower in Palaelodus and missing entirely in modern flamingos, yet also present in the early Adelalopus.

When compared to the same bones in other modern forms, "straight-legged" birds such as cranes and seriemas shows a tendency to flatten the profile of the internal condyle of the tibiotarsus. This has been associated with the tendency of these birds to hold their tibiotarsus and tarsometatarsus relatively straight against one another. In Megapaloelodus this is taken to an extreme, as the profile is not simply flattened but actually indented by a deep, rounded notch that is accompanied by a large, hooked process. A similar hook may have also been present on the profile of the external trochlea.

Fossils assigned to this genus are oftentimes identified based on their greater size relative to Palaelodus species, which are generally smaller than those of Megapaloelodus. There is however overlap between some of the species, for example between Palaelodus ambiguus and Megapaloelodus goliath that add to the doubts around the latter's genus designation. Megapaloelodus opsigonos likewise overlaps in size with the larger Palaelodus species. The Belgian Adelalopus, the oldest known palaelodid, is similar in size to Megapaloelodus and was described as slightly larger than M. goliath. Megapaloelodus species were generally similar in size to the greater flamingo.

== Phylogeny ==
Megapaloelodus is placed in the family Palaelodidae, a group of primarily Neogene stem-flamingos that are considered to be an important link between modern flamingos and grebes, which form the group Mirandornithes. Other members of this family include the more common Palaelodus and the early Adelalopus. Initially Megapaloelodus was thought to be an intermediate between Palaelodus and the groups modern relatives, but later research discovered that palaelodids instead formed a monophyletic sister group to phoenicopterids. The precise internal relationships between the individual species of this family is not known. Mayr and Smith point to various similarities between Megapaloelodus and Adelalopus, which is currently the oldest known member of this group. Within the genus, M. peiranoi has been suggested to be its most basal member due to some similarities with basal mirandornithes like Juncitarsus. The following phylogenetic tree depicts Mirandornithes as recovered by Torres and colleagues in 2015.

- Mirandornites
  - † Juncitarsus
  - - Podicipediformes
    - Phoenicopteriformes
      - † Palaelodidae
      - Phoenicopteridae
        - †Harrisonavis
        - - Phoenicopterus
          - Phoenicoparrus

== Paleobiology ==
Although the exact function of the pronounced notches and hooked processes on the leg bones of Megapaloelodus is not known, Miller mentions the possibility that they may have anchored powerful ligaments. According to him, a colleague suggested that this may have allowed these birds to "lock" their legs in an upright standing position while sleeping, thus stabilizing their resting posture.

It is possible that Megapaloelodus, much like many other phoenicopteriforms, inhabited lakes which at times may have been highly saline or brackish. The shallow lake that formed the sediments of the Barstow Formation may have been freshwater given the presence of freshwater molluscs and the absence of any salts in the deposits, but has been suggested to have undergone cycles of dry periods that concentrated the water. Still conditions are not fully understood, as the local climate may have been wetter than today to allow the presence of palm trees. In the French locality of Saint-Gérand-le-Puy, Megapaloelodus goliath is known to have inhabited a brackish lacustrine environment that underwent cyclical wet and dry periods. Here Megapaloelodus shared its environment with at least two other genera of flamingo. Palaelodus, which may be present in the form of several species, and the more derived flamingo Harrisonavis, which had already developed the curved beak the group is known for. The precise ecology of Megapaloelodus in this environment remains unknown due to the comparative lack of material, in particular that of the skull. Currently, the only known palaelodid with preserved cranial material is Palaelodus itself, which shows a straight bill very different from that of derived flamingos. It is thought to have fed on insect larvae and other aquatic invertebrates.
