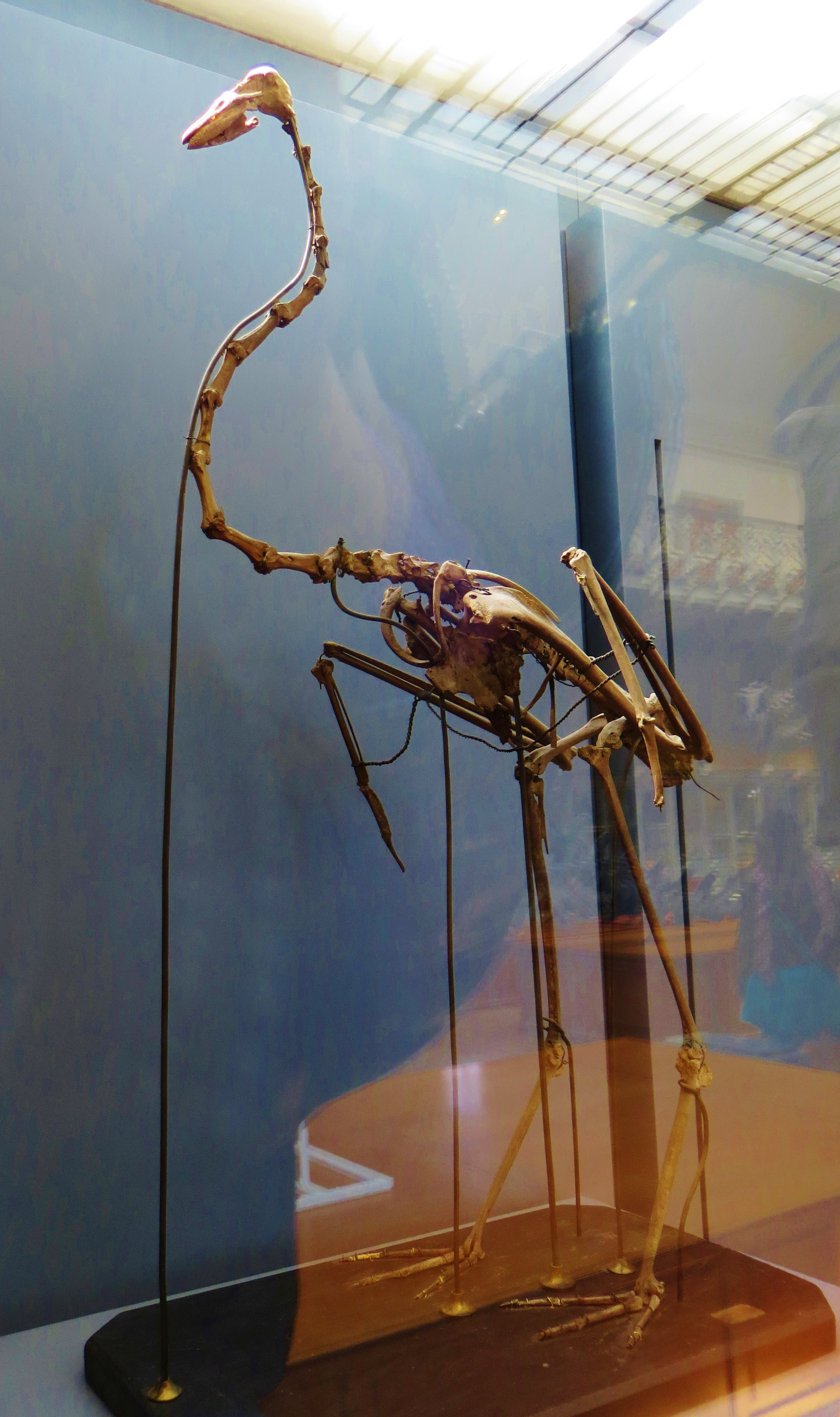
- Palaelodus ambiguus skeleton, Muséum national d'histoire naturelle, Paris

Scientific classification
- Kingdom: Animalia
- Phylum: Chordata
- Class: Aves
- Order: Phoenicopteriformes
- Family: †Palaelodidae
- Genus: †Palaelodus; Milne-Edwards, 1863

Species
- P. ambiguus Milne-Edwards, 1863 (type); P. gracilipes? Milne-Edwards, 1863; P. crassipes? Milne-Edwards, 1863; P. pledgei Baird & Vickers-Rich, 1998; P. wilsoni Baird & Vickers-Rich, 1998; P. aotearoa Worthy et al., 2010; P. kurochkini Zelenkov, 2013; P. haroldocontii Agnolín et al., 2025

= Palaelodus =

Palaelodus Temporal range: Oligocene–Miocene Possible Pleistocene records.

Extinct genus of birds

Palaelodus is an extinct genus of bird of the Palaelodidae family, distantly related to flamingos. They were slender birds with long, thin legs and a long neck resembling their modern relatives, but likely lived very different lifestyles. They had straight, conical beaks not suited for filter feeding and legs showing some similarities to grebes. Their precise lifestyle is disputed, with researchers in the past suggesting they may have been divers, while more recent research suggests they may have used their stiff toes as paddles for swimming while feeding on insect larvae and snails. This behavior may have been key in later phoenicopteriforms developing filter-feeding bills. The genus includes between five and eight species and is found across Europe, Australia, New Zealand, Asia and possibly South America. However some argue that most of the taxa named from Europe simply represent differently sized individuals of one single species. Palaelodus was most abundant during the Late Oligocene to Middle Miocene periods, but isolated remains from Australia indicate that the genus, or at least a relative, survived until the Pleistocene.

== History and naming ==
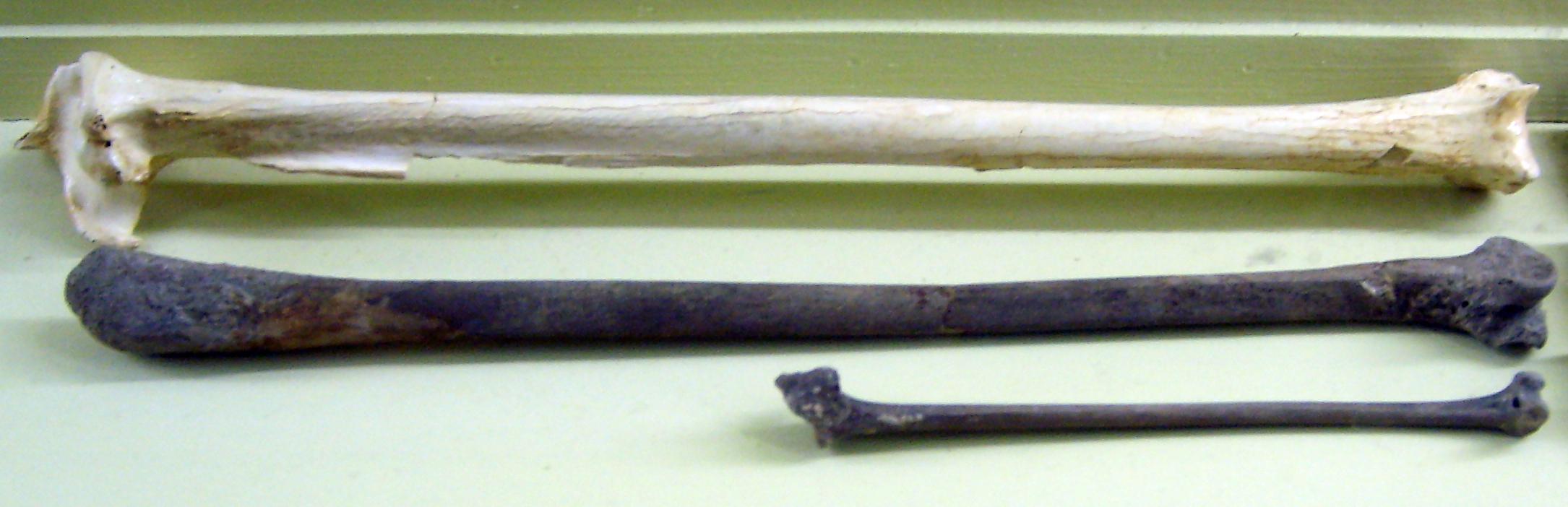
Tibiotarsi of Antigone cubensis, Propelargus edwardsi and Palaelodus gracilipes at the Museum für Naturkunde, Berlin.

The genus Palaelodus was first described by French scientist Alphonse Milne-Edwards in 1863 on the basis of fossils discovered in France's early Miocene deposits of the Saint-Gérand-le-Puy area. Milne-Edwards identified and named three distinct species: Palaelodus ambiguus (the type species), Palaelodus gracilipes and Palaelodus crassipes. In the years following this initial description, Milne-Edwards named two more species: Palaelodus minutus and Palaelodus goliath. In 1933 P. minutus was sunk into P. gracilipes by Lambrecht, a decision not immediately followed by other paleontologists like Brodkorb or Švec, but later accepted by Jacques Cheneval in 1983 during a major revision of the palaelodids of Saint-Gérand-le-Puy. Besides agreeing with the synonymity between P. gracilipes and P. minutus, Cheneval also placed P. goliath in the genus Megapaloelodus, an assessment followed by Heizmann & Hesse (1995). A more conservative number of species was suggested by Mlíkovský in 2002, who placed M. goliath back in Palaelodus, but in turn sunk all of the remaining European Palaelodus species into P. ambiguus, reasoning that they can only be differentiated by size and thus simply represent variation within the species. Although acknowledging that the species proposed by Milne-Edwards may indeed be simply differently sized members of a single taxon, Worthy and colleagues argue that the synonymity proposed by Mlíkovský is premature until a comprehensive comparison of the European material is conducted. Later publications likewise do not follow Mlíkovskýs proposed species model. Palaelodus remains were first recognized in Australia in 1982, but not described until 1998 when Baird and Vickers-Rich erected two new species, P. wilsoni and P. pledgei, based on fossils from the Lake Eyre Basin. Despite being well known from postcrania remains, unambiguous fossils of the skull were long unknown until largely complete crania were described by Cheneval and Escuillié in 1992. Two distal right tibiotarsi recovered in 2008 and 2009 from the Saint Bathans Fauna of the Bannockburn Formation, New Zealand, were described in 2010 by Worthy and colleagues as another new species, Palaelodus aotearoa, and Palaelodus kurochkini was described from remains dating to the Miocene of Mongolia. The most recently named species is P. haroldocontii from the Late Miocene of Argentina.

The name Palaelodus derives from the Ancient Greek "palaios" for "ancient" and "elodes" which means "inhabitant of marshes".

== Species ==
- P. ambiguus

Known from thousands of bones collected from Late Oligocene to Middle Miocene strata of France and Germany, P. ambiguus is one of the best known species of Palaelodus. Regions yielding P. ambiguus bones include Saint-Gérand-le-Puy (MN 2a, Aquitanian), the Mainz Basin and Nördlinger Ries (MN 6, Astaracian). Material from the Oligocene to Miocene Taubuté Basin of Sao Paulo State, Brazil, has also been tentatively assigned to this species. Probalearica problematica is considered synonymous with Palaelodus ambiguus.

- P. haroldocontii

P. haroldocontii is known from the late Miocene Las Flores Formation of central Argentina, known for its abundant avifauna. In terms of size P. haroldocontii is regarded as a large species in the range of most of the other Palaelodus species sans P. pledgei, P. gracilipes and P. crassipes. It was named for Argentinian journalist Haroldo Conti. It might be possible that the Taubuté Basin Palaelodus could also belong to this species rather than P. ambiguus; however, further research would be needed to confirm this.

- P. pledgei

A species that was described from a proximal right tarsometatarsus and a distal right tibiotarsus) collected from the Etadunna of Lake Palankarinna in the Lake Eyre Basin in South Australia. It, alongside P. wilsoni described in the same publication, lived from the Oligocene to Miocene (c. 26-24 mya). Among the two Australian forms, P. pledgei is the smaller taxon and the smallest recognized species of Palaelodus, even smaller than P. gracilipes from Europe. The species name derives from Neville Pledge, who at the time was curator at the South Australia Museum.

- P. wilsoni

A species described from several leg bones collected from the Etadunna Formation of Lake Palankarinna and named in the same 1998 paper as P. pledgei. Like the other Australian species, P. wilsoni lived from the Oligocene to Miocene (c. 26-24 mya). Several specimens from different localities are referred to this species in addition to the type material, including bones from the Namba Formation. It is the larger of the Australian species and approximately the size of the European P. ambiguus and P. crassipes. The name of this species is derived from the Wilson family that allowed fossil collectors access to their property. A single specimen from the Pleistocene Kutjitara Formation near Cooper Creek (roughly 0.2 mya) was also assigned to this species, however more recent research has left it doubtful whether or not the Pleistocene remains belong to P. wilsoni. Subsequently, they may have been those of a different species of Palaelodus or, given the enormous gap in the fossil record, a different genus all together.

- P. aotearoa

A species based on two stout distal tibiatarsi and a tentatively referred sternal fragment from the Early Miocene (19-16 mya) Bannockburn Formation of New Zealand's South Island. P. aotearoa was a medium sized palaelodid and substantially larger than the contemporary P. pledgei, the species that occurred in Australia around the same time. It was slightly smaller than P. wilsoni and in the same general size range as P. ambiguus. The specific epithet is a Māori language name for New Zealand.

- P. kurochkini

The first and currently only known species of Palaelodus from Asia, P. kurochkini was described on the basis of a single partial tibiotarsus found at the terminal Middle Miocene (MNU 7) Ooshin Formation in Mongolia. Several fossils are tentatively assigned to this species, including fragments of the carpometacarpus, a phalanx and a tarsometatarsus. P. kurochkini is a medium-sized member of its family, with the holotype being about the size of a modern American flamingo. Due to some traits differentiating it from both Palaelodus and Megapaloelodus, it may actually represent a distinct genus. Until more material is discovered however it's provisionally included in Palaelodus. It was named in honor of the late Prof. Evgeny Kurochkin.

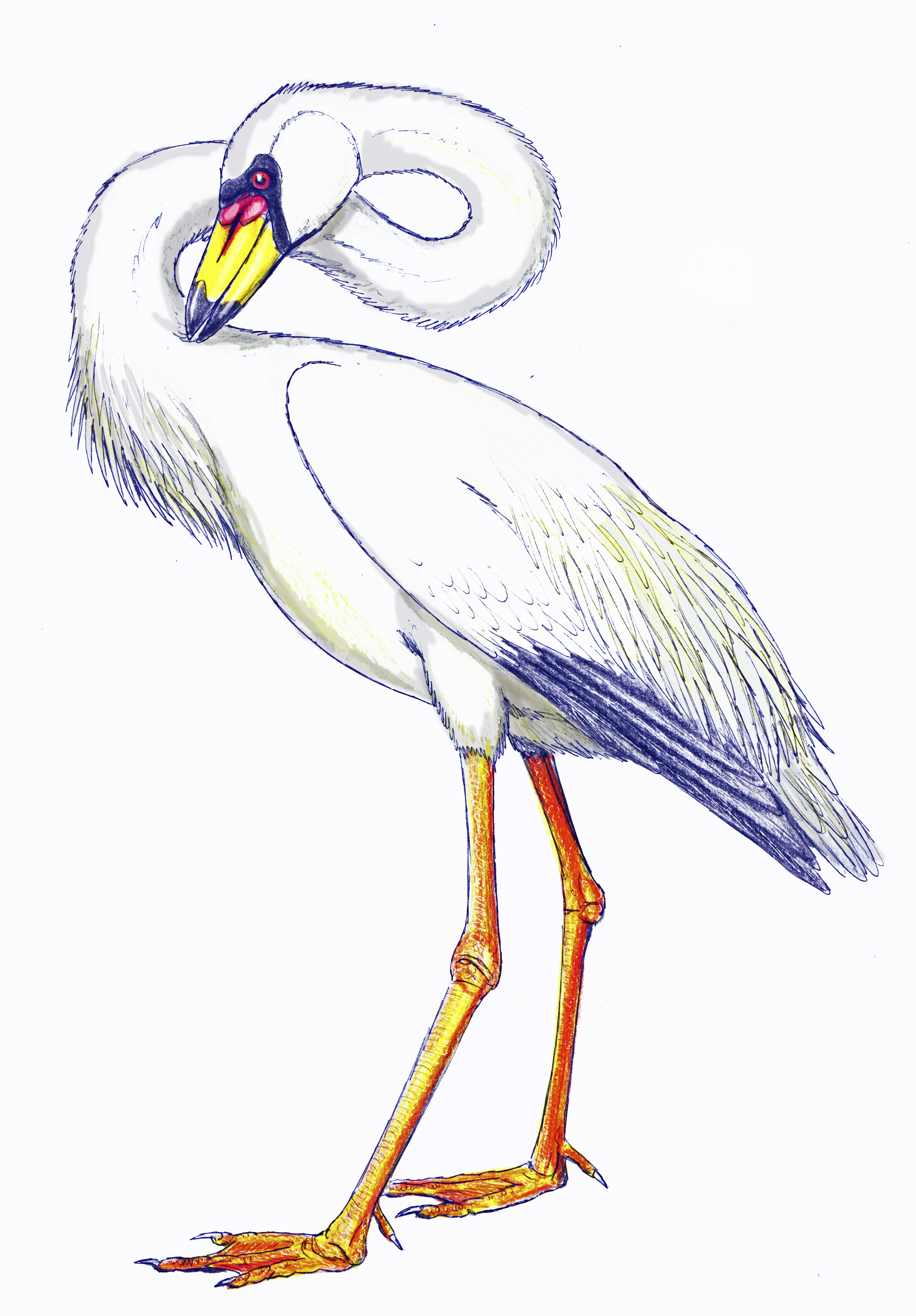
Live reconstruction of P. ambiguus

=== Disputed species ===
- P. gracilipes

A species named alongside P. ambiguus and P. crassipes from the Aquitanian of Saint-Gérand-le-Puy and also found in Nördlinger Ries (MN 6). According to Mlíkovský, this species only represents smaller individuals of the type species, but other researchers argue that declaring the two species synonyms, while not out of the question, would be premature without an extensive look into the available material.

- P. crassipes

A species named alongside P. ambiguus and P. gracilipes from the Aquitanian of Saint-Gérand-le-Puy and also found in Nördlinger Ries (MN 6) and the Steinheimer Basin (MN 7). According to Mlíkovský, this species only represents larger individuals of the type species. Other researchers however argue that declaring the two species synonyms would be premature until the European material is examined in greater detail.

Megapaloelodus goliath was originally described as a species of Palaelodus, but later moved to the American genus Megapaloelodus due to its more robust morphology separating it from the contemporary Palaelodus ambiguus. Still, Mlíkovský suggests that this species should be returned to its original designation. The crane Pliogrus germanicus is now considered to be a type of palaelodid, possibly in the genus Palaelodus.

== Description ==
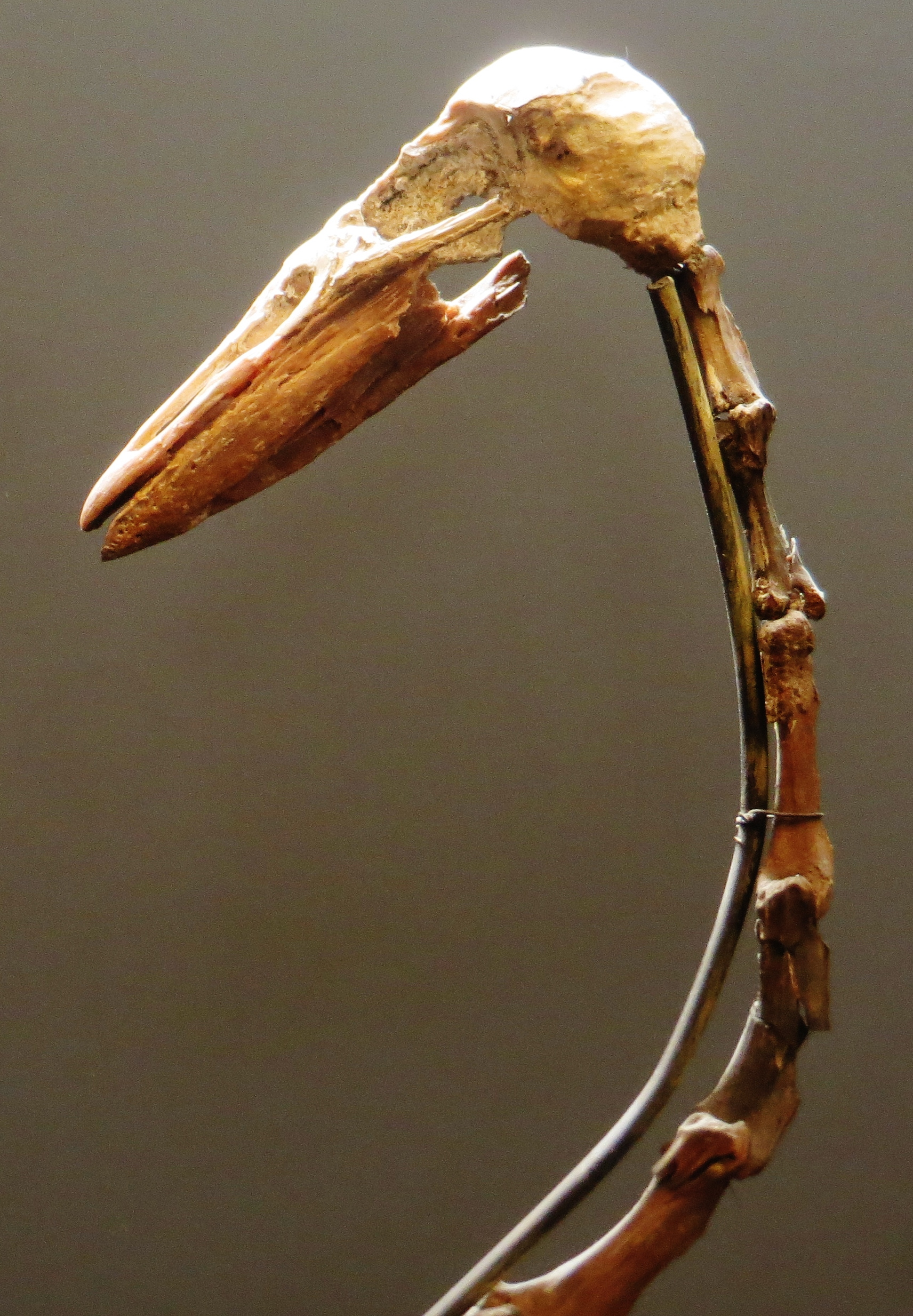
Skull and neck of P. ambiguus

The neurocranium of Palaelodus shares several ancestral traits with the skulls of modern grebes of the order Podicipediformes. Among its autapomorphic traits is the position and development of the fossae glandulae nasales, two depressions for the nasal glands situated between the orbits of the animal. This trait helps differentiate the skull of Palaelodus from the skulls of any other known birds. The temporal fossae form somewhat of an intermediary between grebes and flamingos, more pronounced than in the later but not as deep as in the former. The premaxilla superficially resembles that of cranes, making the bill of Palaelodus appear straight and highly distinct from the curved bills of modern flamingos.

The mandibular ramus is notably deep with an almost straight upper edge and a lower edge that bends and narrows only far behind the symphysis. The rami lack the spongy texture typically associated with flamingos and the upper rim of them is not widened either. Towards the back of the mandible an elongated fossa is found that is also unlike that seen in flamingos, instead resembling the condition observed in grebes. Towards the front of the mandible meanwhile there are distinct foramina, preceding a short but deep mandibular symphysis. The skull of Palaelodus also clearly shows the presence of salt glands.

Specimens from the Mainz Basin as well as Saint-Gérand-le-Puy both show that the notarium, a series of fused vertebrae of the shoulder girdle, consists of five vertebrae rather than the four seen in all extant mirandornithes. The notarium further differs in the orientation of the first vertebra, which in flamingos faces downwards, contributing to a marked kink in the spine of the animal that is not nearly as pronounced in Palaelodus. The first three vertebrae of the notarium all bear a ventral process, while flamingos only show ventral processes on one or two of them which are far less pronounced. In this condition Palaelodus again seems to show an intermediate condition between flamingos and grebes, as the later have well-developed ventral processes on all the vertebrae of the notarium. As the precise number of vertebrae prior to the notarium is unknown, Mayr assumes the same count as in flamingos with a similar division of the neck vertebrae based on bending properties. Based on this, the central and caudal cervicals appear largely similar to those of flamingos, being similarly elongated but lacking the foramina towards the front of the individual vertebrae. Regarding the cranial cervicals, some differences can be identified. The 7th or 8th appear more elongated relative to modern flamingos with a deeper crest formed by the spinous processes, while the known vertebrae thought to be closest to the head, the 4th or 5th, appear less elongated than in flamingos.

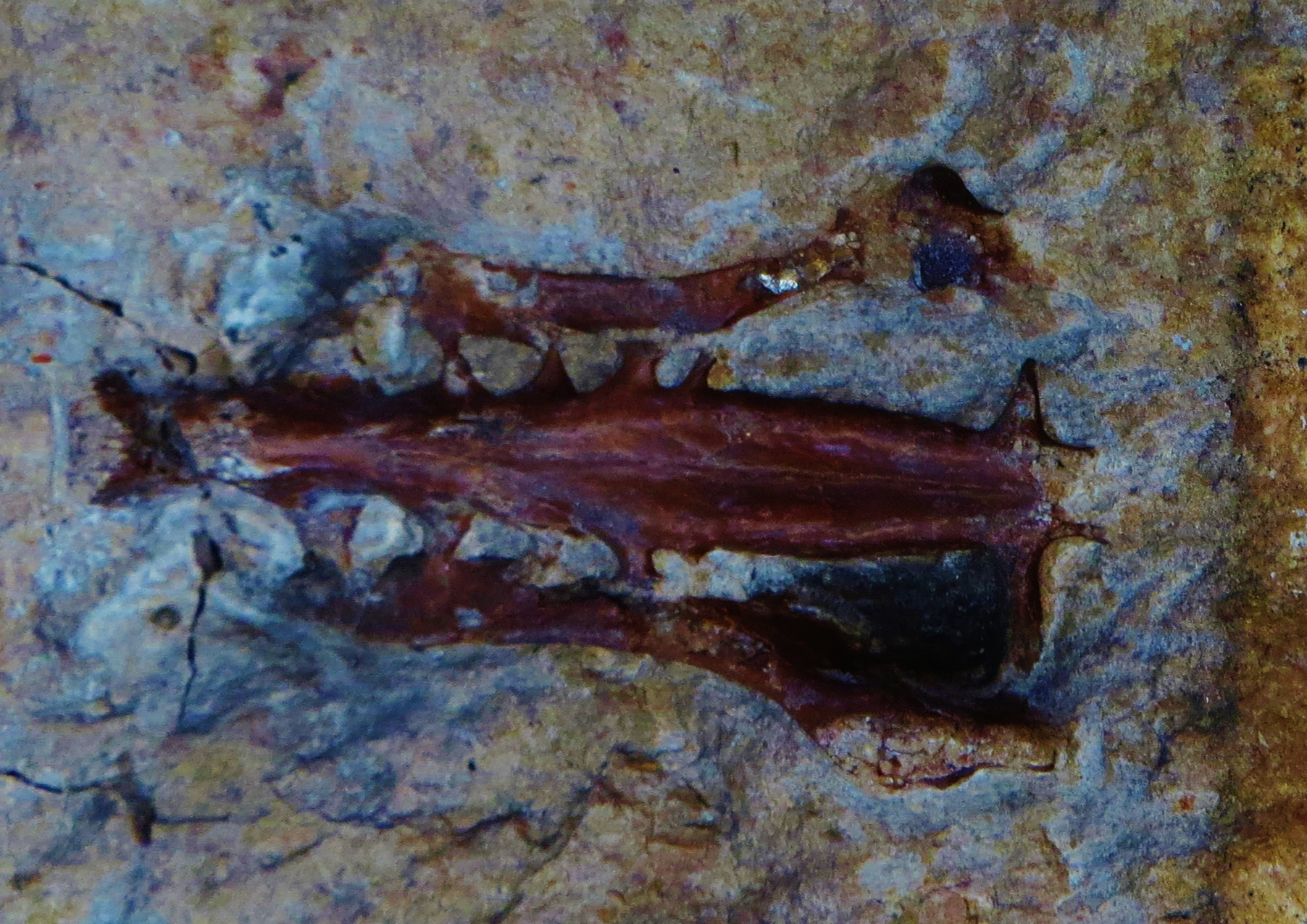
Palaeolodus ambiguus sacrum

The pedal phalanges, the bones that make up the middle toes, of Palaelodus are compressed mediolaterally unlike those of flamingos, deep and with weakly developed convex distal articulation points that lack a furrow. This later characteristic would impact the flexion of the toes and is associated with webbed feet used for locomotion in the water. Although this is also true for grebes to some extent, podicipediforms show dorsoventrally flattened toes, indicating that this is not an ancestral trait and was instead acquired independently in both lineages. The ungual phalanges could not be described by Mayr in his detailed analysis of Palaelodus material, however he notes that older figures seem to indicate that the toe tips were not flattened like in grebes or flamingos and instead show the state typical for other bird groups.

Although still relatively long, the legs of Palaelodus were not nearly as elongated as those of modern flamingos. In particular, the tarsometatarsus was notably shorter than the humerus while the opposite is true for phoenicopterids. The tarsometatarsus further differs from flamingos in that it is laterally compressed, more similar to what is seen in grebes. The pelvis also differs from flamingos, being more narrower than in the extant waders.

== Phylogeny ==
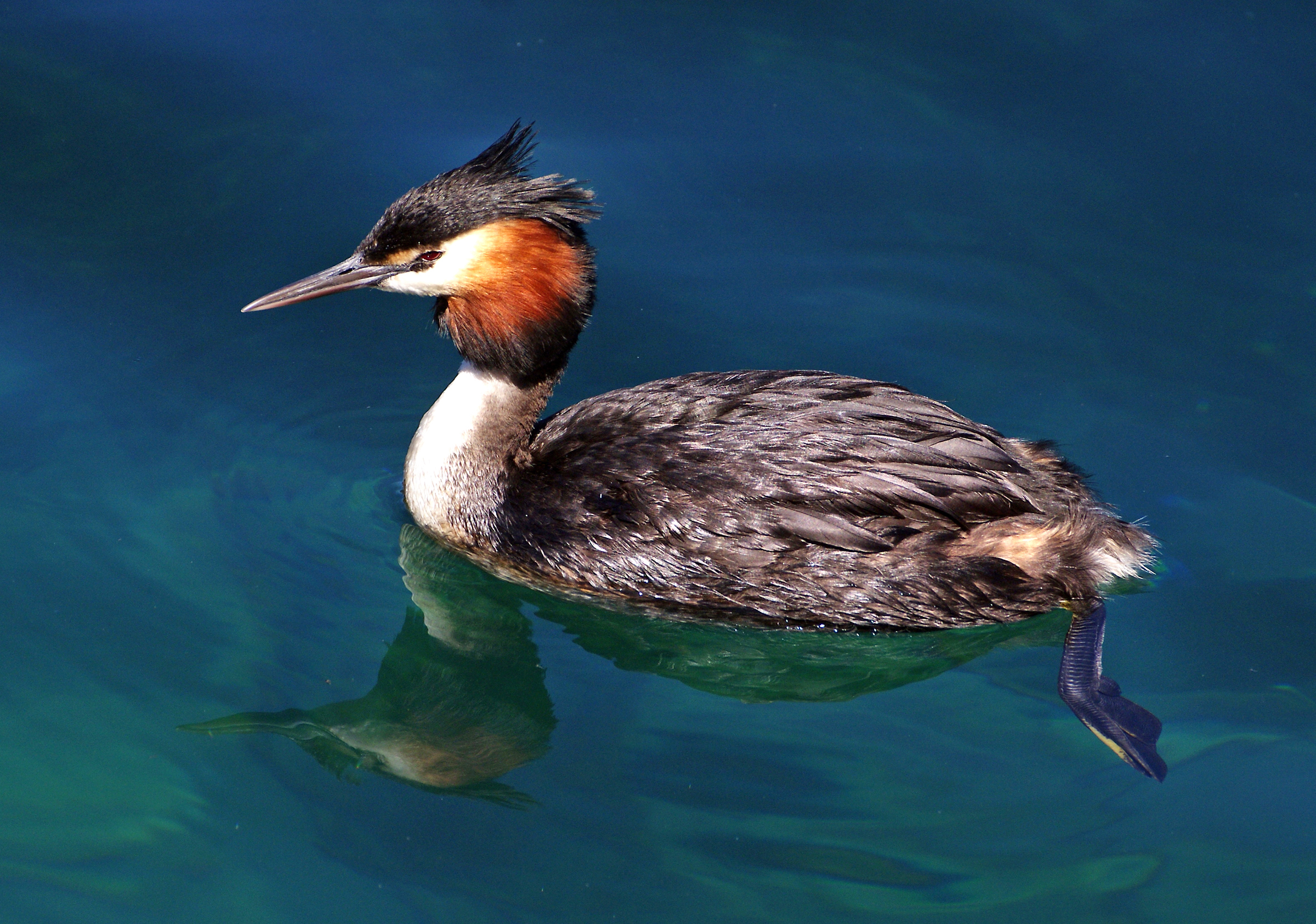
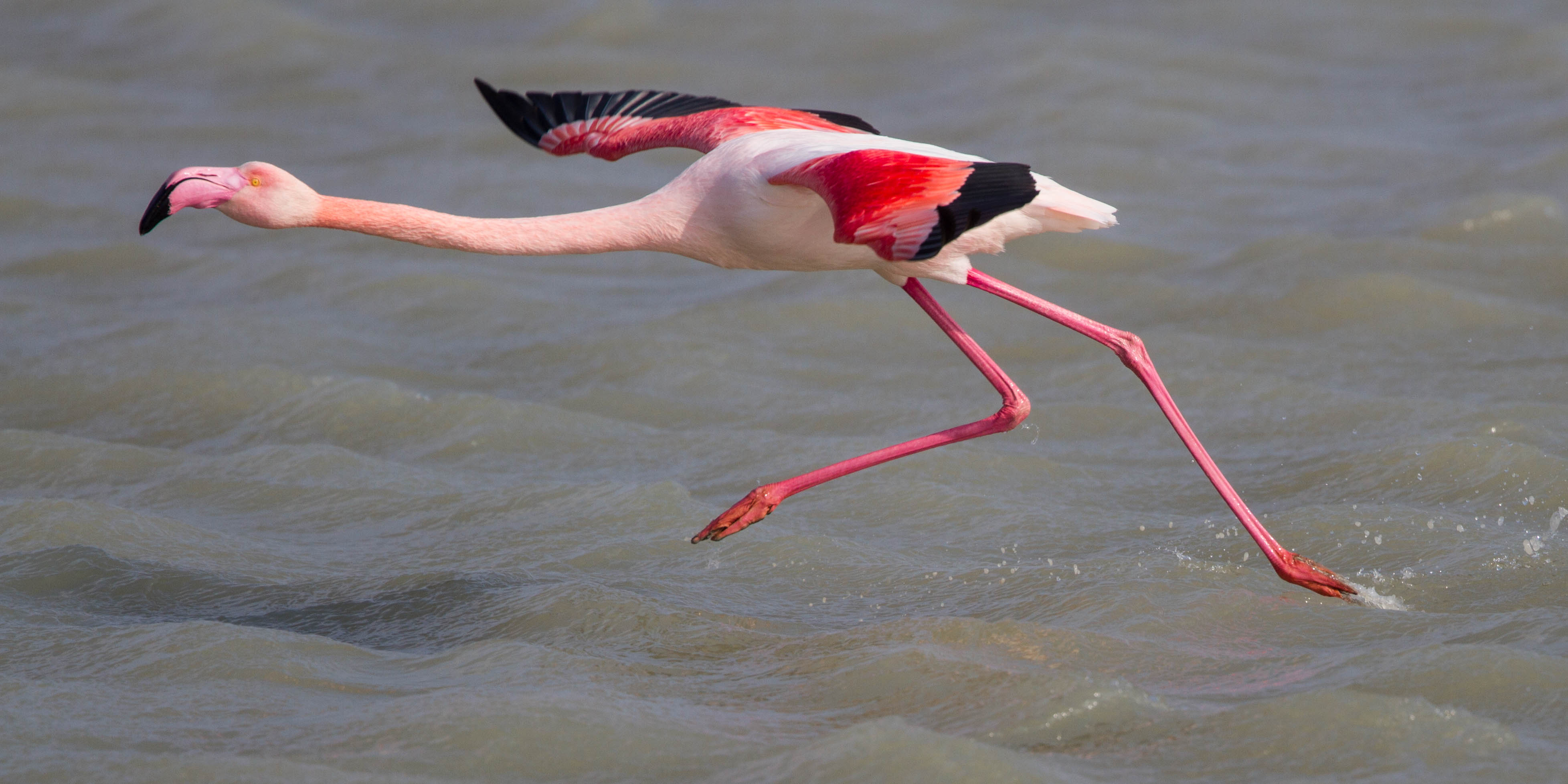
Palaelodids are thought to represent an intermediate between basal mirandornithes similar to grebes and flamingos

The family Palaelodidae is the sister taxon of modern flamingos, with both being placed in the order Phoenicopteriformes. Palaeolodids such as Palaelodus are considered to be an important link in understanding the relationship between flamingos and their next closest relatives, the diving grebes with which they from the clade Mirandornithes. This relationship is well supported by both molecular and morphological evidence and the Palaelodidae form a link between the two extant groups with cranial anatomy and general proportions similar to flamingos but legs akin to those of grebes. The following phylogenetic tree depicts Mirandornithes as recovered by Torres and colleagues in 2015.

- Mirandornites
  - † Juncitarsus
  - - Podicipediformes
    - Phoenicopteriformes
      - † Palaelodidae
      - Phoenicopteridae
        - †Harrisonavis
        - - Phoenicopterus
          - Phoenicoparrus

== Paleobiology ==
=== Locomotion ===
Due to its unique anatomy and intermediary position within mirandornithes, the exact ecology of Palaelodus is not entirely understood. Cheneval and Escuillié both suggest that Palaelodus may have been a diver using its webbed feet for propulsion, however this hypothesis has been questioned by the works of Mayr as well as Worthy and colleagues, both of whom suggest different alternatives. In Worthy et al. (2010) it is suggested that palaelodids were wading birds, more akin to flamingos, while publications by Mayr suggest a swimming lifestyle.

Some of the traits used to infer a diving lifestyle were noted to be also present in flamingos while a pneumatised humerus, as present in Palaelodus, is entirely unknown in divers. Worthy and colleagues point out that, while having laterally compressed tibiotarsi may be a trait shared with diving birds, no bird with such a lifestyle features the same degree of limb elongation as present in Palaelodus. They counter that the compression, as well as other traits of the hindlimbs, could just as well be adaptions to more easily wade through deeper water. Mayr meanwhile specifically points to several traits that according to him support a swimming lifestyle. The compression of the toes is unlike what is seen in any modern wading bird, while the decreased ability to flex the toes suggests the use of the webbed feet as stiff paddles. The distinctly narrower pelvis also points towards a different way of life than that of flamingos.

=== Feeding ===
Cheneval and Escuillié proposed that the deep mandible of Palaelodus may have housed an enlarged tongue similar to that of flamingos and that these birds may have shown the first signs of becoming filter feeders. Although not directly disputing the presence of an enlarged tongue, Mayr points out that the bill of Palaelodus lacked the widened rim that holds the keratinous lamellae that allow flamingos to filter water. Subsequently, even if a thick tongue was present, Palaelodus would likely not have been able to filter feed in the same manner as adult flamingos. Instead the bill shows greater similarity to those of juvenile flamingos, which have not yet developed this mechanism. Furthermore, the enlarged fossae on the sides of the mandibular ramus indicate that movement of the head played a greater role in foraging than it does for flamingos, pointing to a more conventional method of feeding. Besides the anatomy of the mandible, the way the spine is formed is another indicator that palaelodids differed in ecology from flamingos. Flamingos feed while standing with their necks lowering at a right angle, likely aided by the kink in the spine prior to the shoulder girdle. As this kink is not nearly as pronounced in Palaelodus, they likely assumed a different position while feeding. This also matches the fact that the bill lacks the typical hooked shape of the flamingo bill.

Fossils of Palaelodus are exclusively known from lacustrine environments and the presence of salt glands indicates that regardless of the details of their diet, they must have foraged in saline or at least brackish waters like flamingos. The large number of Palaelodus remains found in certain localities indicates that areas inhabited by this genus were rich in their favored food items. Milne-Edwards proposed that this could contain the larvae of caddisflies and snails, which were particularly abundant at Saint-Gérand-le-Puy. Caddisflies are in fact so common in these early Miocene strata that their casings make up part of the local limestone. It is therefore possible that Palaelodids and related genera were specialised in feeding on small invertebrates and subsequently set the groundwork for the more derived filter feeding apparatus of phoenicopterids.

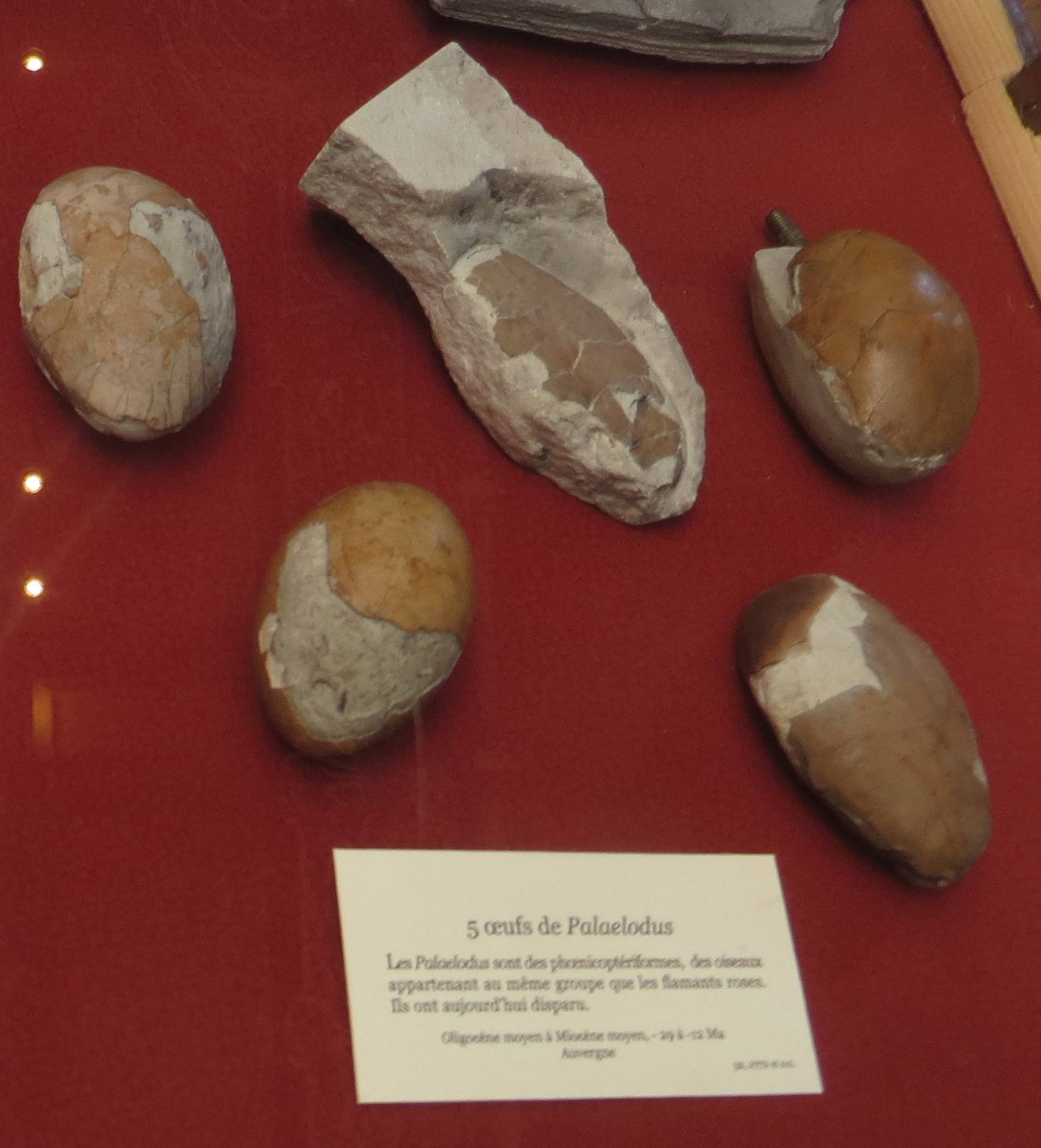
Eggs of Palaelodus from France

Social behavior may have varied between species. Worthy and colleagues argue that the discovery of thousands of bones in France could indicate that the European Palaelodus species may have lived in large flocks like modern flamingos. Species from Australia and New Zealand meanwhile may have been less social based on the fact that only few bones are known across multiple localities. This case is made partially in light of the palaelodid remains from New Zealand, where fossil ducks are found in abundance likely due to flocking behavior, yet the remains of phoenicopteriforms are rare.

=== Paleoenvironment ===
The genus is known to have inhabited saline and brackish lakes and was especially abundant in the Oligocene to Miocene sediments of Europe, where between two and four species may have coexisted. However, this great species diversity depends on whether or not M. goliath is found to nest within Palaelodus and whether or not Milne-Edwards species only represent a single taxon. In Neogene Australia Palaelodus species greatly profited from the availability of salt lakes in the Lake Eyre Basin, where the two recognized species shared their habitat with more derived species of flamingos such as Phoenicopterus novaehollandiae. The presence of juvenile specimens at the Australian lake deposits furthermore shows that these birds bred and nested in these localities. In New Zealand P. aotearoa was found in what is now the Bannockburn Formation, the sediments of the 5,600 km^{2} (2,200 sq mi) paleo-Lake Manuherikia which was fed by a river delta. The avifauna of this lake was dominated by anseriforms, but also featured other birds associated with bodies of water like wading birs, cranes, rails, tubenoses, herons and gulls. Several factors indicate that the environment P. aotearoa was deposited in was heavily affected by wave activity and currents within the lake. The environment that preserves the remains of P. haroldocontii in Argentina has been interpreted as a river system featuring floodplains and lagoons as well as an ephemeral lake, matching the types of biomes inhabited by other species of this genus.

The extinction of Palaelodus may be locally related to the disappearance of the aforementioned salt lakes, as evidenced by the fate of the Australian palaelodids and crown flamingos after the drying of Central Australia's lakes and possibly the extinction of Palaelodus in Argentina following an arid pulse known as the "Age of Austral Plains".
