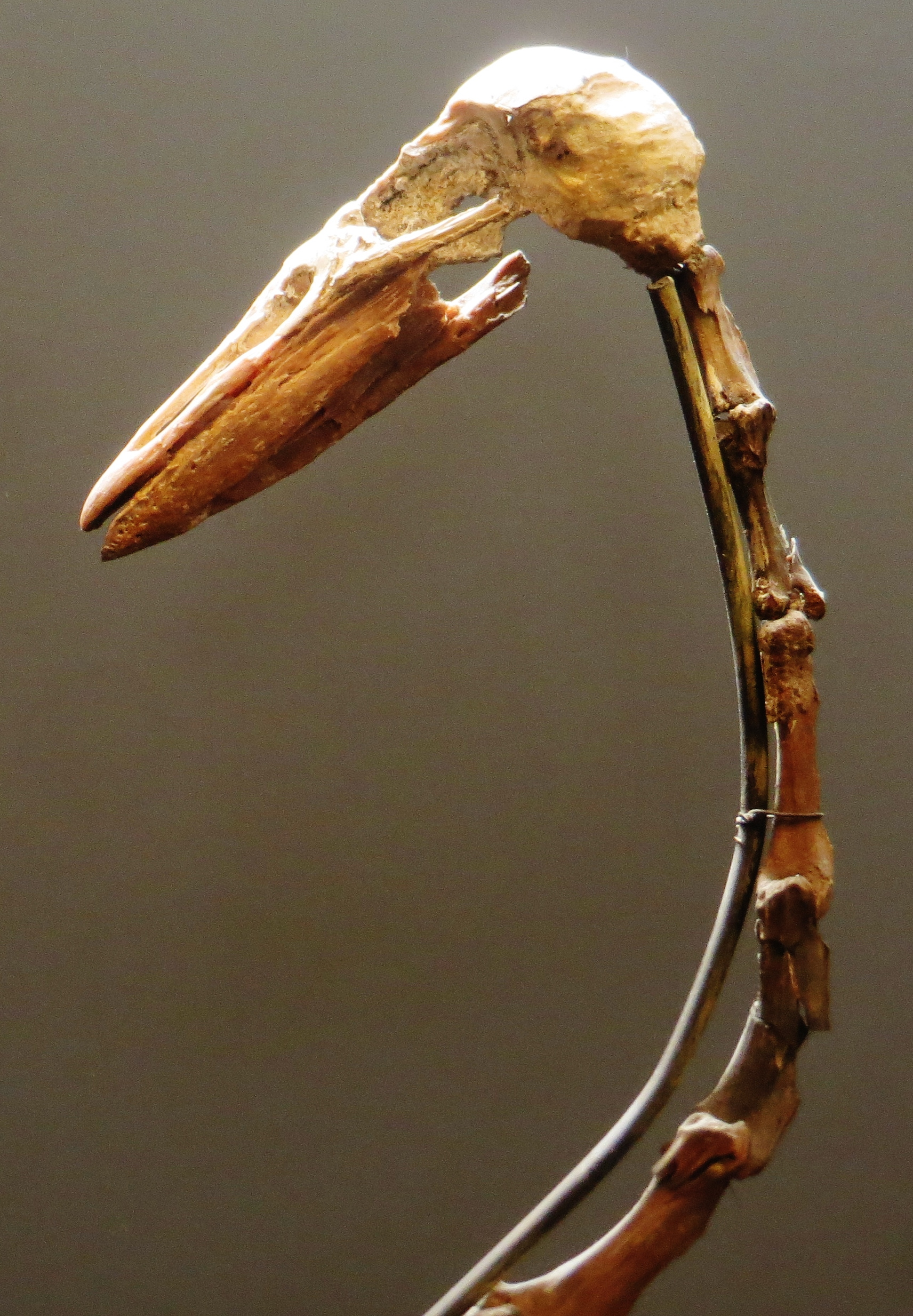
- Skull and neck of Palaelodus ambiguus

Scientific classification
- Kingdom: Animalia
- Phylum: Chordata
- Class: Aves
- Order: Phoenicopteriformes
- Family: †Palaelodidae; Stejneger, 1885

Type species
- Palaelodus ambiguus

Genera
- †Adelalopus; †Megapaloelodus; †Palaelodus

= Palaelodidae =

Palaelodidae Temporal range: Early Oligocene–Pleistocene

Extinct family of birds

Palaelodidae is a family of extinct birds in the group Phoenicopteriformes, which today is represented only by the flamingos. They were widespread during the Neogene, with fossil remains found on all continents other than Antarctica. The oldest remains referred to this group appeared in the fossil record during the Oligocene in Egypt and Belgium, before palaelodids reached their peak diversity during the Miocene. Following this the group declined in the early Pliocene before going extinct on most continents. However, remains found near Cooper Creek in the Lake Eyre Basin indicate that palaelodids managed to survive in Australia until the Pleistocene. Currently three genera are recognized by scientists: Adelalopus, Palaelodus and Megapaloelodus. Most fossil remains stem from Europe and have been assigned to the type species, Palaelodus ambiguus. Due to the fragmentary nature of most of these species, little is known about their ecology. They appear to have preferred brackish lakes and lagoons. Palaelodus has previously been thought to be a wader or diver, but recent research indicates that they were better suited for swimming and possibly fed on insect larvae and other aquatic invertebrates. At least Megapaloelodus appears to have adaptations for "locking" their legs in a standing position.

== History of discovery ==
The first palaelodid remains were discovered during the middle of the 19th century in the region around Saint-Gérand-le-Puy in France. These remains were described by French scientist Alphonse Milne-Edwards who recognized several, in his mind distinct, forms of birds that he included in the new genus Palaelodus, a name he derived from the Ancient Greek words "palaios" (ancient) and "elodus" (inhabitant of marshes). Milne-Edwards initially named three species; P. ambiguus, P. gracilipes and P. crassipes; before returning later and establishing two more species, P. minutus and P. goliath. However most of these species would eventually come to be recognized as likely having belonged to a single form displaying variation in size among individuals. Approximately 20 years after the first description of Palaelodus, Leonhard Stejneger established the family Palaelodontidae after having misinterpreted the original etymology. This would eventually be amended by Howard, who changed it to Paloelodidae, and even later by Brotkorb who introduced the current spelling, Palaelodidae. During the 1940s and 1950s remains similar to the ones from Europe would come to be discovered in the western United States, leading to the establishing of the genus Megapaloelodus by Alden H. Miller. Although only known from a few fragmentary bones, Miller remarked that the American material appeared significantly larger than that of the European Palaelodus goliath and subsequently chose to reflect this in the genus name (although Miller misspelled Palaelodus in the process). An additional form, Megapaloelodus opsigonus, also known from fragmentary remains was named around 20 years later by Pierce Brodkorb. The 1980s saw a major revision of the European species, with Jacques Cheneval working of older work and synonymizing much of the French material into a single species while also transferring P. goliath into Miller's Megapaloelodus. The range of this family received a significant boost when fossil material of these birds was discovered in the early Oligocene of Africa and the Oligocene to Miocene of Australia. Another significant find was the discovery of unambiguous skull remains, first described by Cheneval and Escuillié in 1992. Another potential revision was suggested in 2002 by Jiří Mlíkovský, who proposed that Palaelodus and Megapaloelodus should be lumped into a single genus. This was however met with criticism and not widely accepted. The same year as Mlíkovský's suggested revision, Mayr and Smith described Adelalopus (an anagram of Palaelodus), an entirely new genus of palaelodid from the early Oligocene. The 2000s and 2010s also saw the description of multiple new species in the established genera.

== Species ==
Genus	Species	Age	Location	Notes
Adelalopus	Adelalopus hoogbutseliensis	Early Oligocene	Belgium	The oldest known palaelodid.
Megapaloelodus	Megapaloelodus connectens	Miocene	USA	The type species of Megapaloelodus.
Megapaloelodus	Megapaloelodus goliath	Oligocene-Miocene	France Germany	M. goliath was originally described as a species of Palaelodus. Its referral to Megapaloelodus is uncertain.
Megapaloelodus	Megapaloelodus opsigonus	Early Pliocene	USA Mexico	The youngest species of Megapaloelodus.
Megapaloelodus	Megapaloelodus peiranoi	Miocene	Argentina	M. peiranoi is thought to be the basalmost species of Megapaloelodus.
Palaelodus	Palaelodus ambiguus	Oligocene-Miocene	France Germany Brazil?	The type species of Palaelodus. Two other species, P. gracilipes and P. crassipes are thought to simply be smaller and larger individuals of this species respectively. It is the best understood species of palaelodid, known from thousands of individual bones. It is also the only species known from skull material.
Palaelodus	Palaelodus aotearoa	Early Miocene	New Zealand	A medium-sized species of Palaelodus.
Palaelodus	Palaelodus haroldocontii	Late Miocene	Argentina	A large sized species that may also include the Brazilian material previously assigned to P. ambiguus.
Palaelodus	Palaelodus kurochkini	Middle Miocene	Mongolia	P. kurochkini shows several features that might indicate that it should be placed in its own, distinct genus.
Palaelodus	Palaelodus pledgei	Oligocene-Miocene	Australia	The smallest species of palaelodid.
Palaelodus	Palaelodus wilsoni	Oligocene-Pleistocene?	Australia	Fragmentary remains from Cooper Creek might indicate that this species survived until the Pleistocene.

The genera Probalearica as well as the species "Grus" miocenicus and Pliogrus germanicus were all initially described as cranes, but were later found to represent members of the Palaelodidae.

=== Range ===
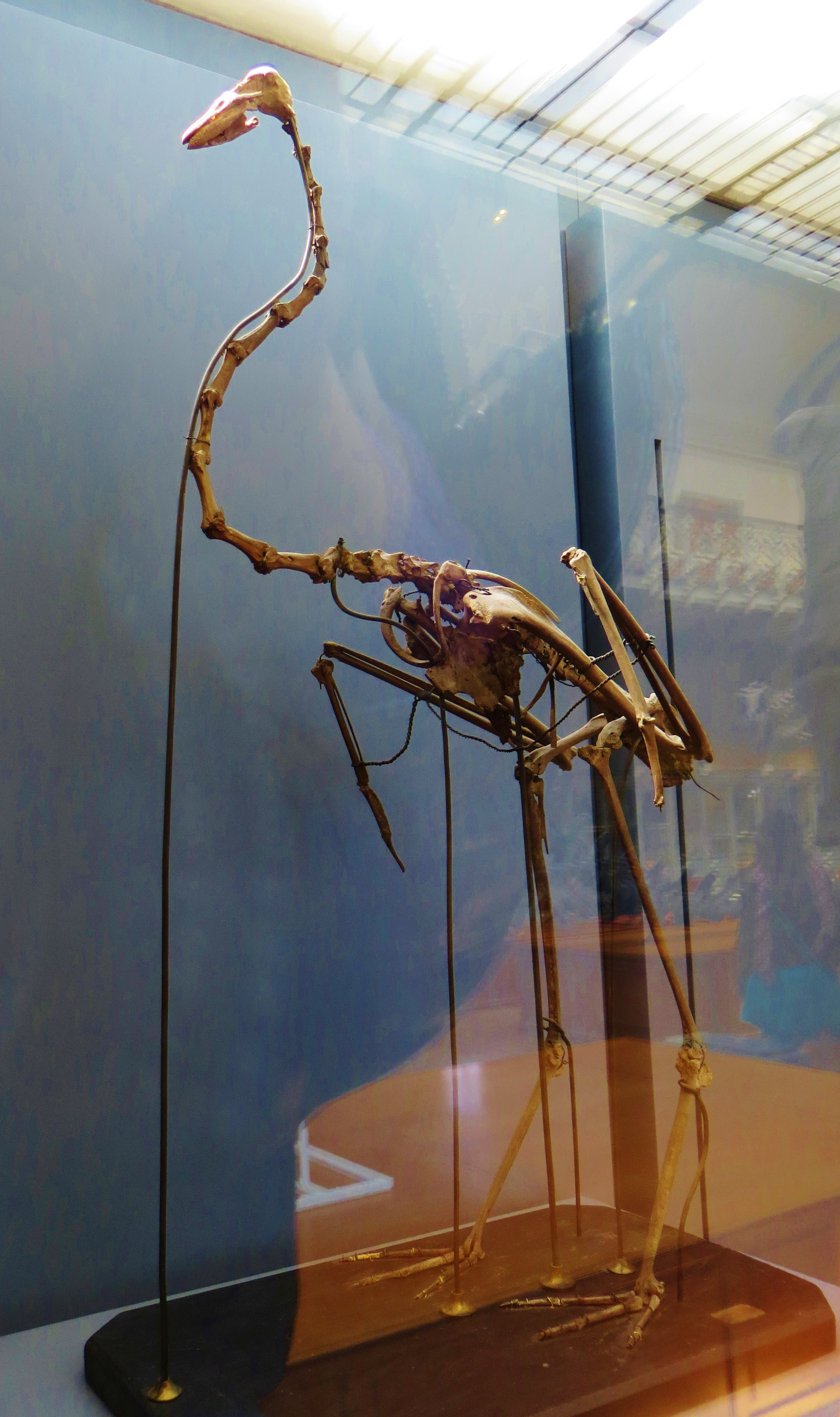
Palaelodus ambiguus skeleton

Palaelodids were a successful group of bird found across all continents except for Antarctica, with their diversity being the greatest during the Miocene period.

- Eurasia

The most extensive record of the family can be found in Europe, beginning with Adelalopus in the early Oligocene of Hoogbutsel, Belgium. While this genus is currently only found in one locality, the younger Palaelodus appear to have been much more widespread, being found in the form of thousands of bones in Saint-Gérand-le-Puy, France, and multiple localities in Germany including the Mainz Basin, Nördlinger Ries and the Steinheimer Basin. Megapaloelodus remains were also found in Saint-Gérand-le-Puy, the Steinheimer Basin and Nördlinger Ries. Other fossils have been discovered in Bohemia in the Czech Republic and Romania. Records in Asia are more sparse, with only a single described species known from the Middle Miocene Ooshin Formation in Mongolia.

- America

America primarily yielded remains of the large genus Megapaloelodus, which is chiefly known from formations of the west coast. This includes fossils from Oregon's Juntura Formation and California's Barstow Formation and the Sharktooth Hill Bonebed. Further inland fossils were found in the Rosebud Formation of South Dakota. These fossils mostly date to the Miocene, with the exception of the material from Oregon which suggests an early Pliocene age. Further south Megapaloelodus was found in the Miocene to Pliocene Almejas Formation of Cedros Island (Baja California). In South America Megapaloelodus fossils were found in the Andalhualá and Ituzaingó Formation of Argentina while material assigned to Palaelodus cf. ambiguus have been identified from Brazil's Taubuté Basin. However, this material could also belong to Palaelodus haroldocontii, which was described from material from Argentina's Las Flores Formation.

- Africa

While there are no described species from Africa, remains are still known from multiple localities. Two differently sized types have been recovered from the early Oligocene Jebel Qatrani Formation of Fayum, Egypt. A possible species of Megapaloelodus was found in the early Miocene Northern Sperrgebiet of Namibia.

- Oceania

Three species of Palaelodus are currently accepted from Australasia. Two of these were present in the Oligocene to Miocene Etadunna and Namba Formation within the Lake Eyre Basin. While the third was found in New Zealand's Bannockburn Formation, corresponding to the early Miocene in age. While palaelodid remains are primarily known from these Neogene localities, isolated remains were also discovered in the much younger Kutjitara Formation, indicating that the group may have survived until 0.2 mya.

== Description ==
Broadly speaking palaelodids resemble their modern relatives, the flamingos, in proportions. They had long legs and elongated necks. Despite these similarities, the two groups still differed in how these features were expressed or in how well they were developed. The neck for example lacks the pronounced kink where the vertebrae of the neck connect to those of the notarium and the tarsometatarsus is shorter than the humerus unlike in flamingos. Additionally, the limb bones are laterally flattened which is closer to the condition seen in grebes. The toes share this flattening and are limited in how much they can flex. The anatomical features responsible for the later are additionally associated with the presence of webbed feet, lending credence to the hypothesis that they were divers or swimmers. However, while grebes feature similar adaptations, the details of the flattening suggests that both groups evolved these traits independently from one another. Skull material is only known from a single species, Palaelodus ambiguus, and features a straight, conical bill very much unlike the curved bills of their modern relatives. Although it is uncertain if other palaelodids would have the same head shape, at least P. ambiguus appears to mix traits of grebes with those of flamingos. Matching with their preference for brackish water, P. ambiguus confirms that at least some species within the family had salt glands.

Palaelodids generally fall within the size range of modern species of flamingo. Palaelodus is considered to be the smallest genus in the family, with the smallest species being Palaelodus pledgei. P. kurochkini, which is described as medium-sized for its genus, has been said to be the size of an American flamingo. Larger Palaelodus species overlap with small species of Megapaloelodus, such as M. goliath and M. opsigonos. M. connectens and Adelalopus were both noted to be larger than M. goliath, the former reaching a size similar to a large male greater flamingo and the later being said to have been slightly larger than M. goliath.

== Phylogeny ==
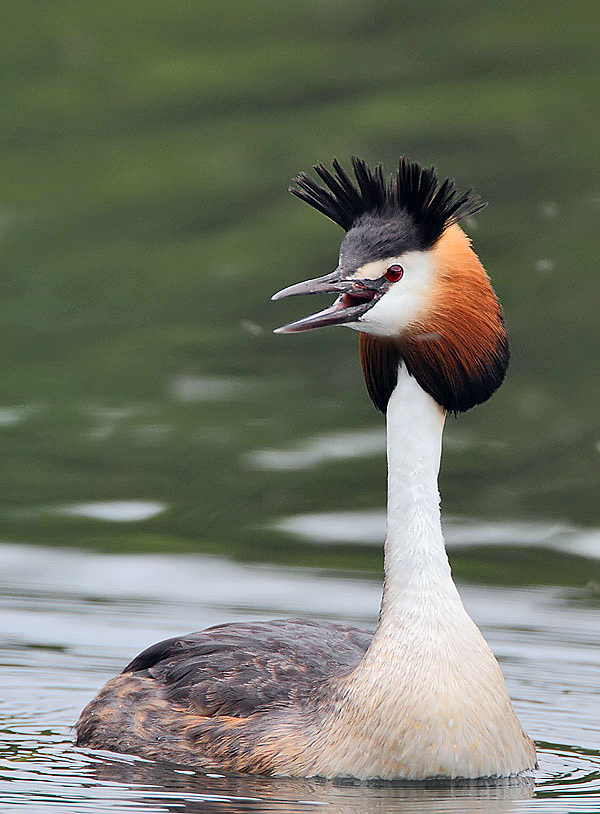
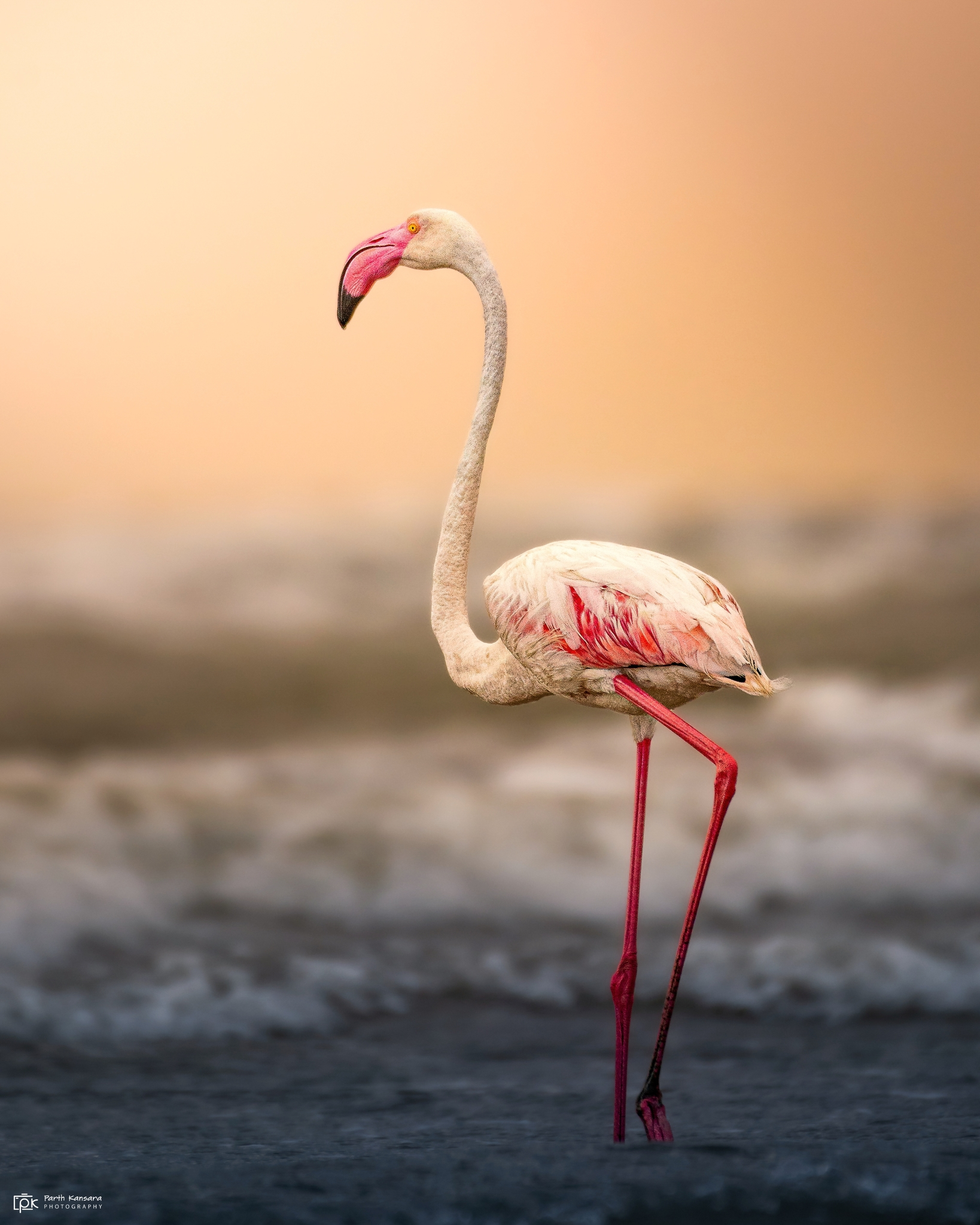
Palaelodids are most closely related to modern flamingos, linking them to the diving grebes

The Palaelodidae is a family within the clade Phoenicopteriformes, which includes the modern flamingos of the Phoenicopteridae. Together with grebes they form the clade Mirandornithes. The relationship between these groups is well supported by morphological and molecular data respectively, with palaelodids being the sister family to flamingos and forming an important link between the two extant families. Based on Palaelodus, these birds displayed general proportions similar to flamingos but legs akin to those of grebes. The precise internal relationships in this family are not well understood. Adelalopus appears to have been the oldest member of the group and shares similarities with the later Megapaloelodus. Among the species of Megapaloelodus, M. peiranoi is thought to be the basalmost member due to its resemblance to some early mirandornithes, specifically Juncitarsus. The following phylogenetic tree depicts Mirandornithes as recovered by Torres and colleagues in 2015.

- Mirandornites
  - † Juncitarsus
  - - Podicipediformes
    - Phoenicopteriformes
      - † Palaelodidae
      - Phoenicopteridae
        - †Harrisonavis
        - - Phoenicopterus
          - Phoenicoparrus

== Paleobiology ==
=== Paleoenvironment ===
Many of the rock units that yielded palaelodid remains are thought to have represented shallow lakes or similar environments at the time the bird fossils were deposited. Furthermore, many of these are believed to have been either occasionally or permanently brackish or even saline, indicating that these animals had habitat preferences similar to modern flamingos. The genus Adelalopus for instance appears to have inhabited the shores of a lagoon in what is now Belgium. In a 1989 study Jacques Cheneval analysed the bird species of the type locality of Saint-Gérand-le-Puy, finding that over half of the identified taxa show a preference for brackish conditions while freshwater exclusives appear to have been absent. This was later supported by studies that proposed that the locality underwent cyclical dry and wet seasons, with the salinity of the lake changing through the evaporation of water. This appears to have been an attractive environment for early phoenicopteriforms, given the presence of vast numbers of Palaelodus and more rarely Megapaloelodus and Harrisonavis. Additionally, the discovery of juvenile birds and eggs suggests that palaelodids also bred there. Another similar environment was present in the Lake Eyre Basin, which is thought to have supported salt lakes throughout much of the Neogene and early Quaternary. These localities mirror those of Europe in preserving not just the remains of juvenile palaelodids but also the fossils of more derived flamingos that seemingly coexisted with their more basal relatives. In the case of Australia specifically, this included Phoenicopterus novaehollandiae and Phoeniconotius eyerensis at Lake Palankarinna.

However, palaelodids show some additional range beyond brackish lakes and lagoons. The Jebel Qatrani Formation, where two indetermined palaelodids were discovered, is thought to represent a mix of tropical lowland swamp and marshland supported by a series of river channels that empty into the Tethys Ocean. Palaelodus aotearoa from New Zealand inhabited paleo-Lake Manuherikia, which preserves a rich fauna of water fowl and even the remains of crocodiles. Worthy and colleagues describe the environment as a large lake fed by a river delta that was highly affected by wave activity and currents within the lake itself. The Northern Sperrgebiet of Namibia also preserves the presence of freshwater without signs of saline lakes like those inhabited by the European and Australian taxa. The Barstow Formation also likely represented a freshwater rather than brackish environment.

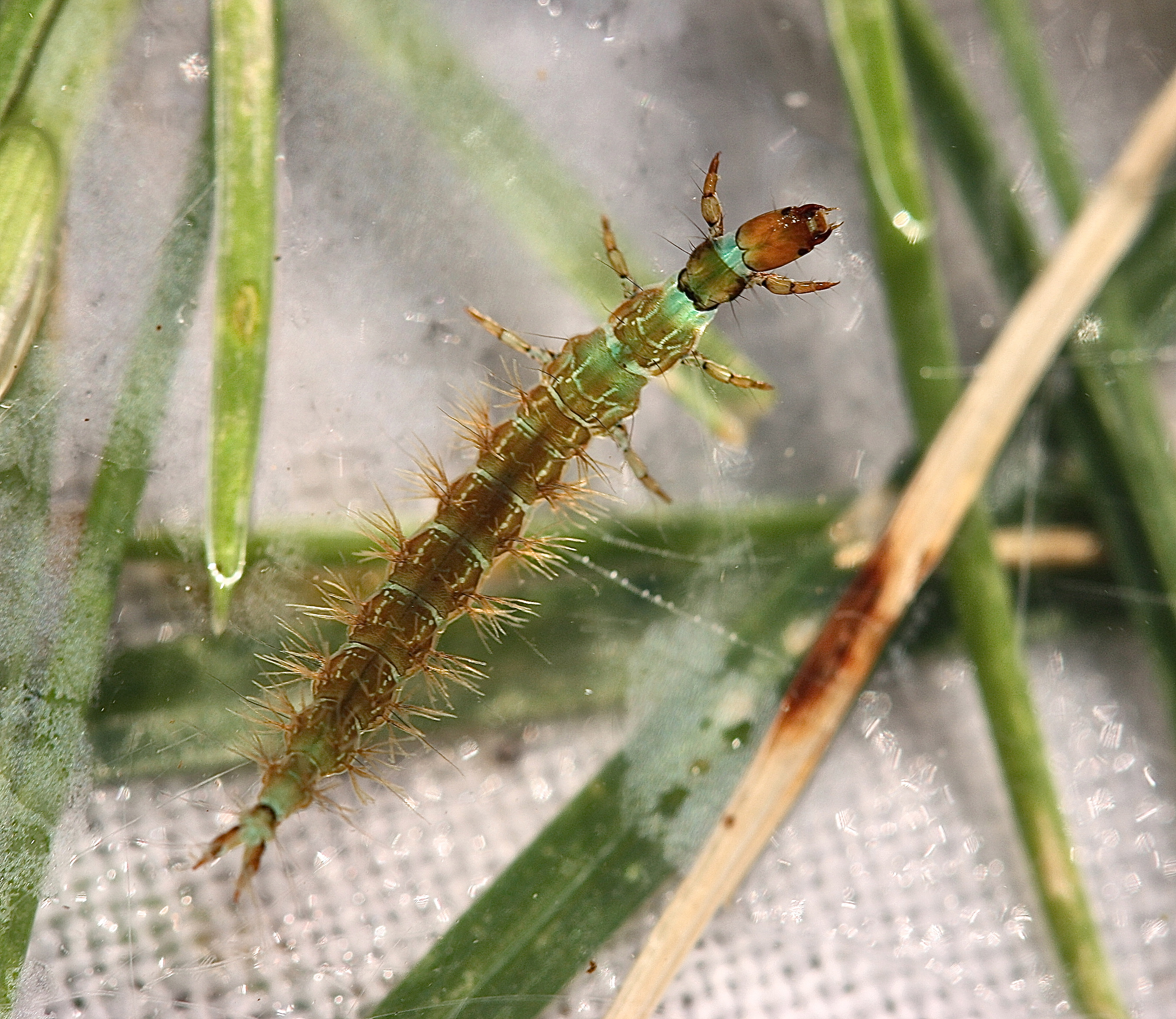
Palaelodids may have fed on caddisfly larvae and other small invertebrates

=== Locomotion and feeding ===
Little is known about the precise habits of most palaelodids given the lack of substantial fossil material outside of Palaelodus ambiguus. Subsequently, most of what has been proposed for this group is based on said species. Palaelodids lack several of the adaptations found in flamingos that help them in their filter feeding lifestyle, such as the curved jaw, attachment point for keratinous lamellae and the absence of the pronounced kink in the spine prior to the shoulder girdle. The absence of these features all point towards the fact that they had a notably different way of feeding despite their affinity for similar environments. One possibility that has been suggested is that palaelodids fed on various aquatic invertebrates, specifically snails and caddisflies. The later are known to have been especially abundant in the French deposits, where their casings make a substantial contribution to the local limestone. It is possible that the modern filter-feeding apparatus of flamingos evolved from this or a similar feeding method.

Their precise way of life has also been the subject of much debate. Earlier research on P. ambiguus, primarily the works of Cheneval and Escuillié, proposed that they may have been leg-propelled divers. More recently this hypothesis has been called into question, partially due to the fact that no diving bird possesses limbs as elongated as what was present in palaelodids. Worthy and colleagues suggest a wading lifestyle, arguing that the compressed and elongated limbs may have aided in wading more easily through deep water. Mayr on the other hand proposes a swimming lifestyle, pointing towards the reduced ability of the toes to flex being unsuited for wading. In his hypothesis the webbed feet and compressed toes would be more suited to work as propulsion while swimming. Given its more fragmentary nature, Megapaloelodus has been subject to less speculation regarding its lifestyle. Miller notes that the bones of the lower leg appear to have a mechanism that could "lock" them in place. This could help stabilize the bird while standing in a position without moving.
