= Adelalopus =

Adelalopus Temporal range: Rupelian

Scientific classification
- Kingdom: Animalia
- Phylum: Chordata
- Class: Aves
- Order: Phoenicopteriformes
- Family: †Palaelodidae
- Genus: †Adelalopus; Mayr & Smith, 2002

Type species
- Adelalopus hoogbutseliensis Mayr & Smith, 2002

Genus of birds

Adelalopus is an extinct genus of palaelodid bird from the lowermost Oligocene of Belgium. It is the oldest member of its family and the largest known palaelodid from Europe, slightly larger than Megapaloelodus goliath. It contains a single species, Adelalopus hoogbutseliensis.

== History and naming ==
The remains of Adelalopus were discovered at the locality of Hoogbutsel, Belgium, approximately 30 km (19 mi) east of Brussels and are stored at the Museum of Natural Sciences of Belgium. The type specimen IRScNB Av 71 consists of an incomplete furcula, parts of a coracoid, a scapula, the distal end of an ulna and the shaft of a radius as well as an incomplete tarsometatarsus. A second specimen (IRScNB Av 72) is referred to the genus, consisting of the extremitas omalis of the left coracoid. The same element is present for the right coracoid in the holotype. All material included in the type specimen is considered to be from a single individual based on the proximity of the bones, their size and their similar surface texture. The referred coracoid was found in a different box, but may potentially have belonged to the same individual as well.

The name Adelalopus is an anagram of Palaelodus, a relative of the genus. The species name references the type locality.

== Description ==
The furcula has a wide U-shape and on the caudal surface of the extremitas sternalis there is a marked depression like in Palaelodus. Unlike in Palaeolodus however the center of this element contains a deep and elongated cavity, which is regarded as one of the genus' diagnostic features. The apophysis of the wishbone is larger and better developed than in modern flamingos but incomplete. The coracoid is similar to that of Megapaloelodus, with the facies that articulates with the clavicle overhanging two pits separated from each other by a bulge. These same bits are weak in Palaelodus and missing entirely in modern flamingos. The medial and lateral sides of the cotyla scapularis are not sharply differentiated and the foramen for the supracoracoid nerve is well-developed and elliptical like in basal-anseriforms and phoenicopteriforms. The scapula is short with a slender shaft similar to Palaeolodus. The incomplete nature of the ulna makes comparison difficult, but it generally resembles what is expected from palaelodids and modern flamingos. Although fragmentary, the tarsometatarsus is diagnostic. Its cross section is rectangular like in modern flamingos and not compressed like in other palaelodids. The distal vascular foramen is larger and longer than in either palaelodids or phoenicopterids and in this state more closely resembles the Eocene bird Juncitarsus, which has been recovered as either a basal member of Mirandornithes or a stem-Phoenicopteriform. The trochlea of the second digit faces plantar like typical for the group and was positioned higher than the trochlea of the following two toes. As seen in Palaelodus, this trochlea was located further up than in modern flamingos.

Adelalopus is slightly larger than Megapaloelodus goliath, making it one of the largest members of the Palaelodidae. The individual bones are identical in size to the extant coscoroba swan from South America.

== Paleoecology ==
The Hoogbutsel locality where the remains of Adelalopus were found is thought to represent what was once the shore of a lagoon. With the locality being considered to be early Oligocene in age, Adelalopus would be among the earliest known palaelodids. The function of the deep cavity located on the furcula is not known, it is however thought to be too large to be a simple pneumatic foramen and too small to enclose a tracheal loop.
