= Harrisonavis =

Harrisonavis Temporal range: Chattian-Aquitanian28–13 Ma

Scientific classification
- Kingdom: Animalia
- Phylum: Chordata
- Class: Aves
- Order: Phoenicopteriformes
- Family: Phoenicopteridae
- Genus: †Harrisonavis; Kashin, 1978

Type species
- Phoenicopterus croizeti Gervais, 1852

Genus of birds

Harrisonavis is an extinct genus of flamingo that lived during the Late Oligocene and Early Miocene periods in what is now France. Despite being one of the oldest known members of the flamingo family, it already shows a skull remarkably similar to that of the modern greater flamingo. Although generally similar, it subtly differs in the curvature of the bill and the size of the ventral keel of the maxilla, both signs that Harrisonavis was not yet as adapted towards filter feeding as modern species are. Harrisonavis inhabited brackish lakes alongside the more basal Palaelodidae. It contains the single species Harrisonavis croizeti, first described in 1852.

== Discovery and naming ==
Harrisonavis was first reported in 1852 by paleontologist Paul Gervais on the basis of a nearly complete skull which showed a similar morphology to modern flamingos of the genus Phoenicopterus. Due to this superficial similarity, it was assumed that the fossils belonged to an extinct species of said genus, then named Phoenicopterus croizeti. Although the type material was only poorly described by Gervais and later lost, other fossils of skull material would eventually be found, specifically the rostral halves of both upper and lower bill. Harrison and Walker, who described one of said bill fragments in 1976, considered the fossils to be distinct enough to warrant a new genus, Gervaisia. Unbeknownst to them however, the name Gervaisia was already occupied by a species of millipede. Kashin renamed the genus to Harrisonavis in 1978. Another upper bill was figured by Olson and Feduccia and assigned to a juvenile individual in 1980, but not described in detail. Eventually, another In 2015, another skull (specimen ML StG 203bis) was described from Saint-Gérand-le-Puy. This skull consisted of most of the cranium and the adjacent caudal region of the bill, making it the first cranial material since the lost type material.

== Description ==
The known fossil material of Harrisonavis broadly agrees with the morphology seen in modern Phoenicopterus species with their large and compact bills, setting it apart from both Phoenicoparrus and Phoeniconaias with their smaller, bulbous bills and the contemporary Palaelodus, a phoenicopteriform with a straight, pointed beak. The nares of Harrisonavis are elongated, but more similar to those of modern flamingos than to those of Palaelodus, in which the nares take up much of the bill. In Harrisonavis the nares stand out due to their proximity to the point where the bill begins its downward curvature, extending beyond the beginning of the curvature and almost approaching the inflection point. The frontal bones also resemble modern flamingos, with high ridges just behind the nares and shallow fossae just above the orbits.

The upper bill, much like that of Phoenicopterus, is broad and shallow, not spoon-shaped as in the lesser flamingo. Like in modern flamingos, the region before the nares leading up to the tip is lined with foramina, however uniquely the bone itself is mostly solid and not reticulated like in extant taxa. This trait is consistent across both the juvenile bill illustrated by Olson and Feduccia and the bill of an older individual described by Cheneval. The maxillary keel, located on the underside of the upper bill, is more similar to Phoenicopterus, if even shallower than seen in either the modern species or the extinct genus Leakeyornis. Both ML StG 203bis as well as previously recovered bill material show that the keel forms two ridges which eventually broaden and flatten until forming a single ridge that extends to the tip of the bill. The overall shape of the bill is subject to change as the animal grows, as shown by the upper bill material. The juvenile remains show a much shallower curvature, while in adults the bill curves more abruptly.

The lower bill shows a strong dorsal curvature matching the way that the upper bill curves downward with ridges on the sides typical for flamingos. As expected for members of its family, the lower bill is much deeper than the upper and strongly mediolaterally compressed. When put together with the upper bill, it becomes noticeable that the silhouette of Harrisonavis' bill was much less curved overall than in any modern flamingo, which matches the narrower maxillary keel. In size the upper bills FSL 442292 and NMB MA 9594 both indicate a size similar to the modern greater flamingo.

== Phylogeny ==
The anatomy of the skull indicates that Harrisonavis lies outside the crown-group of flamingos, which diverged during the Pliocene to Pleistocene. Although previous publications have argued that the similarities between Harrisonavis and Phoenicopterus indicate that the two were more closely related to one another than to the deeper billed Phoenicoparrus and Phoeniconaias, Torres and colleagues argue that the similarity is due to the plesiomorphic state of the bill seen in Phoenicopterus. This shows that the general feeding ecology of Phoenicopterus was already developed by the Late Oligocene and saw very little change until today, with the other modern flamingo genera simply showing an even greater specialisation and increased filtering efficiency towards small organisms like diatoms.

- Mirandornithes
  - † Juncitarsus
  - - Podicipediformes
    - Phoenicopteriformes
      - † Palaelodidae
      - Phoenicopteridae
        - †Harrisonavis
        - - Phoenicopterus
          - Phoenicoparrus

== Ecology ==
The close resemblance to modern flamingo species indicates that Harrisonavis was already a filter feeding animal. In modern taxa its the ventral surface of the upper bill as well as the margins of the lower bill that hold the keratinous lamellae that allow flamingos to filter water in search of prey, while the deep lower bill also holds the enlarged tongue of these birds. The fact that the keel of Harrisonavis is much shallower than in modern species, as well as the shallower, less curved lower bill, supports the idea that the filtering mechanism in this genus was not yet as well developed as in the flamingos of today. Specifically, the curvature of the bill may have meant that Harrisonavis held its head more vertically while filtering, as opposed to the upside-down position assumed by modern flamingos. Although the articulation of the lower bill was also found to differ, with the reduction of certain muscles impacting the way the head could be held during feeding and display, it is not yet clear how great the effect would have been exactly.

Cheneval used Harrisonavis as well as other fossil birds recovered at Saint-Gérand-le-Puy in an attempt to reconstruct the environment of the area. With over half of the fossil birds analysed by Cheneval preferring brackish water and no exclusively freshwater species present, he concludes that the area was likely covered by brackish water. Later research found that Saint-Gérand-le-Puy was a complex of lacustrine environments undergoing repeated change between wet and dry conditions, causing brackish conditions through evaporation, as indicated by Hydrobia gastropods. Harrisonavis shared this environment with palaeolodids including Megapaloelodus and Palaelodus.
