= Agnopterus =

Agnopterus Temporal range: Late Eocene to Early Miocene

Scientific classification
- Kingdom: Animalia
- Phylum: Chordata
- Class: Aves
- Order: Phoenicopteriformes
- Family: †Agnopteridae; Lambrecht, 1933
- Genus: †Agnopterus; Milne-Edwards, 1869

Type species
- †Agnopterus laurillardi Milne-Edwards, 1869

Species
- †A. laurillardi Milne-Edwards, 1869; †A. hantoniensis Lydekker, 1891; †A. turgaiensis Turgarinov, 1940; †A. sicki Alvarenga, 1990

Extinct water bird

Agnopterus is an extinct genus of stem-flamingo phoenicopteriform with fossil material from France, as well as possibly England, Kazakhstan, and Brazil. The holotype specimen for type species A. laurillardi is an incomplete distal tibiotarsus from Late Eocene gypsum from Paris; a coracoid, humeri, a scapula and perhaps a proximal femur have been recovered from Late Eocene to Early Oligocene of England to a possible second species, A. hantoniensis. Two additional species from the Late Oligocene-Early Miocene have been named as well. A. turgaiensis of Kazakhstan (distal tibiotarsus and distal humerus) and A. sicki of Brazil (distal end of tibiotarsus). While all four species are considered to be close to the ancestry of flamingos, their exact relationships and placement as members of Agnopterus is uncertain.
