= Almejas Formation =

Geologic formation in Mexico

- Stratigraphic range: Messinian-Zanclean; ~7.2–3.6 Ma
- Type: Formation

Lithology
- Primary: Sandstone
- Other: Conglomerate

Location
- Region: Baja California
- Country: Mexico

The Almejas Formation is a geologic formation in Mexico. It preserves fossils dating back to the Late Miocene to Early Pliocene of the Neogene period.

== Fossil content ==
Various fossils have been found in the formation:

=== Mammals ===
- Aivukus cedrosensis
- Albireo whistleri
- Balaenoptera sp.
- Denebola brachycephala
- Dusignathus santacruzensis
- Parapontoporia pacifica
- Piscolithax boreios
- Piscolithax tedfordi
- aff. Plesiocetus sp.
- Praekogia cedrosensis
- Thalassoleon mexicanus

=== Birds ===
- Cerorhinca minor
- Mancalla cedrosensis
- ?Megapaloelodus opsigonus
- Morus sp.
- Puffinus tedfordi
- ?Synthliboramphus sp.

=== Fishes ===
- Carcharodon cf. carcharias
- Carcharhinus sp.
- Megalodon

== See also ==
- List of fossiliferous stratigraphic units in Mexico
