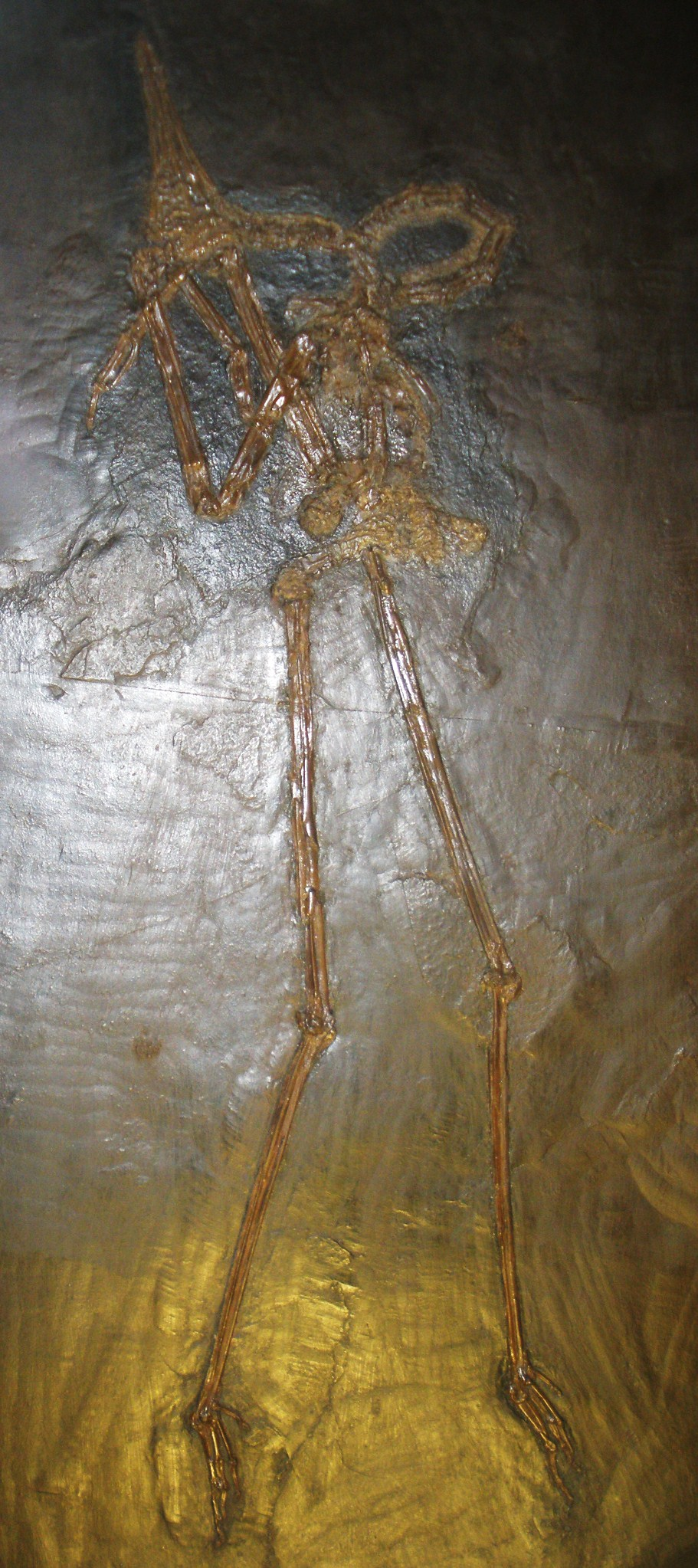
- Fossil specimen of J. merkeli from Messel, Museo di Storia Naturale

Scientific classification
- Kingdom: Animalia
- Phylum: Chordata
- Class: Aves
- Clade: Mirandornithes
- Genus: †Juncitarsus; Olson & Feduccia, 1980

Species
- †Juncitarsus gracillimus Olson & Feduccia, 1980 †Juncitarsus merkeli Peters, 1987

= Juncitarsus =

Juncitarsus Temporal range: Ypresian–Lutetian

Extinct genus of birds

Juncitarsus is an extinct genus of wading birds from the Eocene of the United States and Germany. Though previously considered a flamingo, it is likely outside of Phoenicopteridae, possibly a basal member of the Mirandornithes (neither Phoenicopteriformes or Podicipediformes).

== History ==
A small set of bones were collected in 1946 and 1947 by Charles Lewis Gazin, Franklin L. Pearce, and George F. Sternberg at a locality in the Bridger Formation of Wyoming. These bones were sent to be studied by Alexander Wetmore, though he could not identify the species. It was not until 1980 that they were named by Storrs L. Olson and Alan Feduccia. The nominate species was named J. gracillimus with the nomenclature meaning "slender reed ankle". A second species, J. merkeli from Germany was named in 1987 by Stefan Peters.

== Description ==
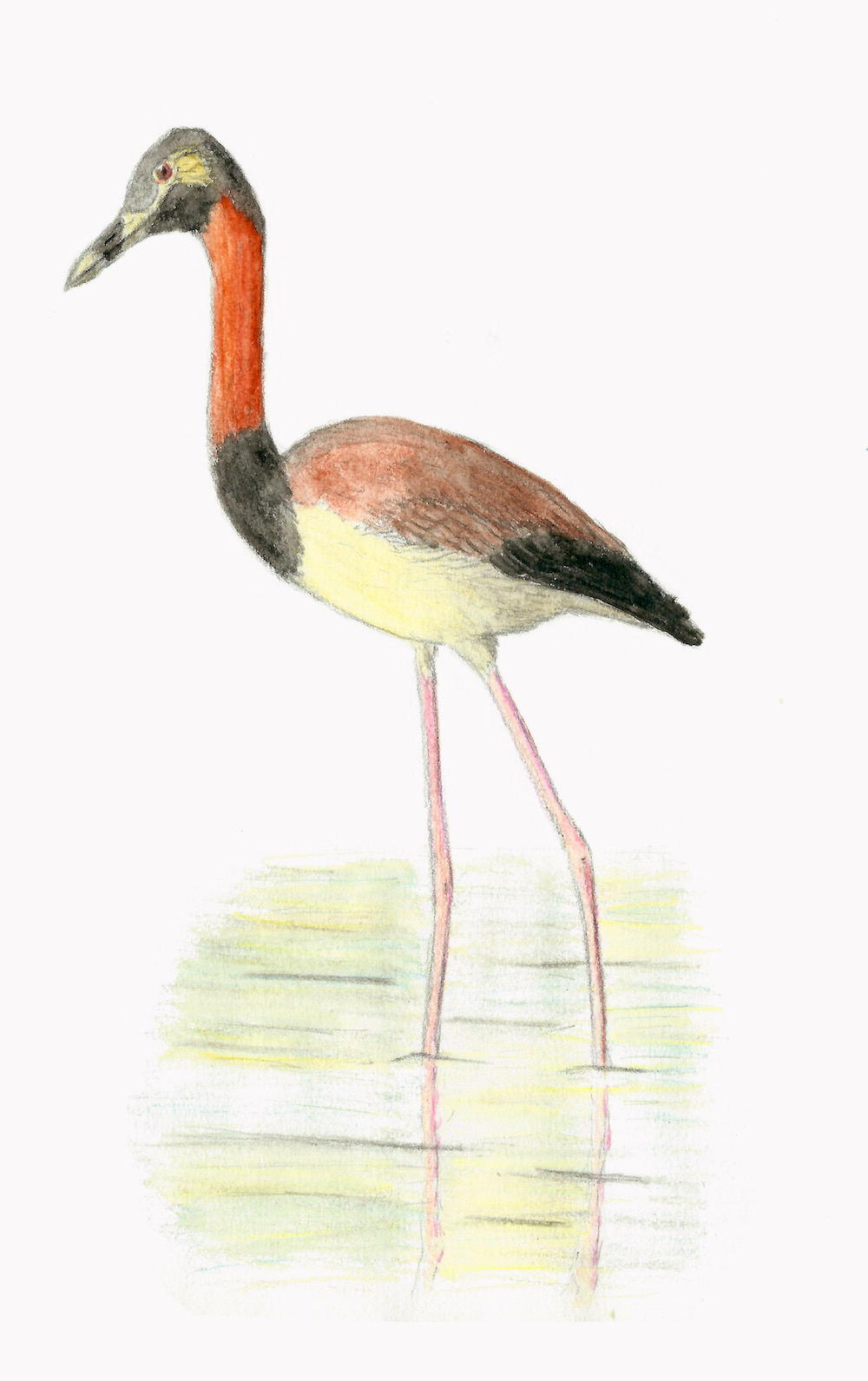
Life restoration of J. merkeli

The remains of J. gracillimus belong to at least three adult or nearly adult birds and one chick, which at the time of death could not fly. Different sizes of bones may indicate sexual dimorphism. In the holotype (USNM 244318), the left tarsometatarsus is almost completely preserved; only a small inner part of the proximal section is missing. One right tarsus includes only the proximal section, the other - the proximal section and fragments of the head of the joint (lat. trochlea). The distal section of the right tarsus, fragments of the left tibiotarsus without a tarsus, the distal section of the right tibiotarsus, the anterior part of the left scapula, and an unfused frontal bone were preserved in a young specimen. In addition, the distal part of the right femur, fragments of the humerus and ulna, some phalanges of the fingers and vertebrae have been preserved.

Based on the more completed J. merkeli (SMF A 295), the genus was a long-legged bird with a long, slender bill as seen in stilts.

== Classification ==
Olson and Feduccia had originally classified Juncitarsus as the earliest known member of the flamingo family Phoenicopteridae, though due its overall similarity to the family Recurvirostridae that authors suggested a kinship between flamingos and the avocets and stilts. This resulted in classifying flamingos as members of the shorebird order Charadriiformes. However this is not currently supported by recent lines of morphological and molecular evidence as flamingos related to grebes in the clade Mirandornithes. In light of this, Juncitarsus has been considered to be a basal mirandornithean. The following phylogenetic tree depicts Mirandornithes as recovered by Torres and colleagues in 2015.

- Mirandornithes
  - †Juncitarsus
  - - Podicipediformes
    - Phoenicopteriformes
      - †Palaelodidae
      - Phoenicopteridae
        - †Harrisonavis
        - - Phoenicopterus
          - Phoenicoparrus

== Paleobiology ==
Juncitarsus is known from both the Bridger Formation of Wyoming and the Messel Pit of Germany dating from the Ypresian to the Lutetian stages of the Eocene epoch. Based on the available evidence, Juncitarsus was a colonial species of wading bird. Despite this wading lifestyle, this is actually a derived featured for this genus in respect to later mirandornitheans as it is believed this was required independently between Phoenicopteriformes and Juncitarsus. This is due the hypothesis that the common ancestor of grebes and flamingos was that of a swimming waterbird and not a wader. Furthermore Juncitarsus lacks some of the derived features that are seen in extant mirandornitheans.
