= Tibiotarsus =

Leg bone in birds

Pigeon skeleton; numbers 10 and 11 indicates the tibiotarsus

The tibiotarsus is the large bone between the femur and the tarsometatarsus in the leg of a bird. It is the fusion of the proximal part of the tarsus with the tibia.

A similar structure also occurred in the Mesozoic Heterodontosauridae. These small ornithischian dinosaurs were only distantly related to birds and the similarity of their foot bones is best explained by convergent evolution.

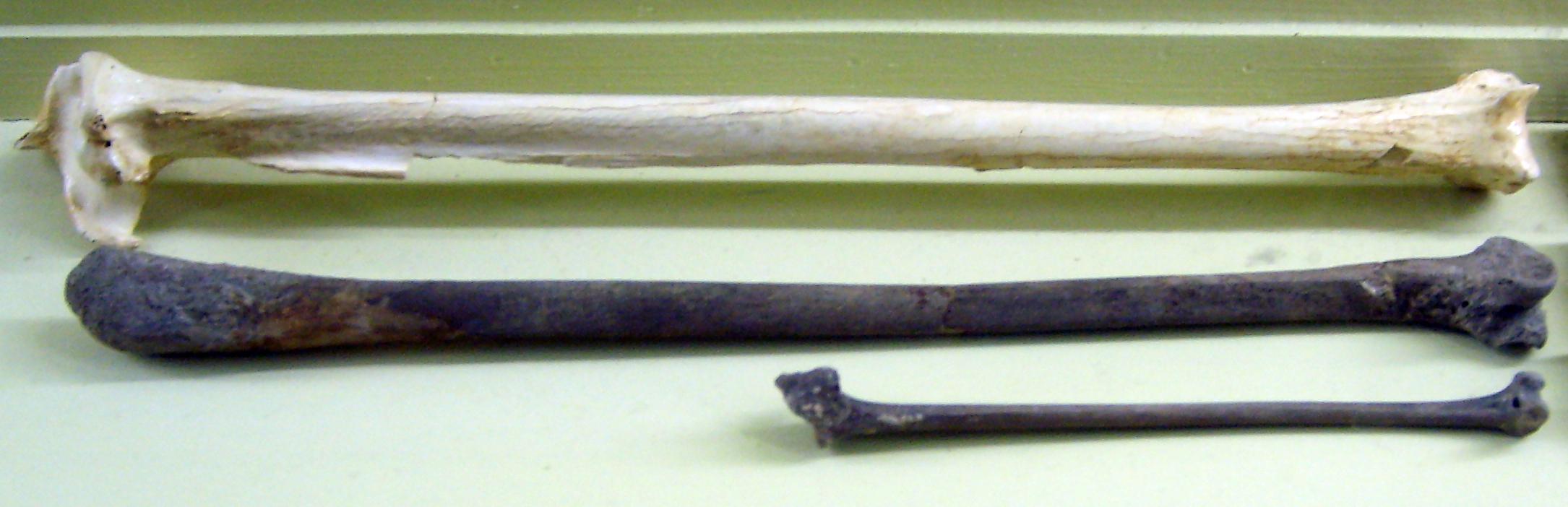
Tibiotarsi of Grus cubensis, Propelargus edwardsi, and Palaelodus gracilipes at the Museum für Naturkunde, Berlin

== See also ==
- Bird anatomy
