= Notarium =

Anatomical structure in birds and pterosaurs

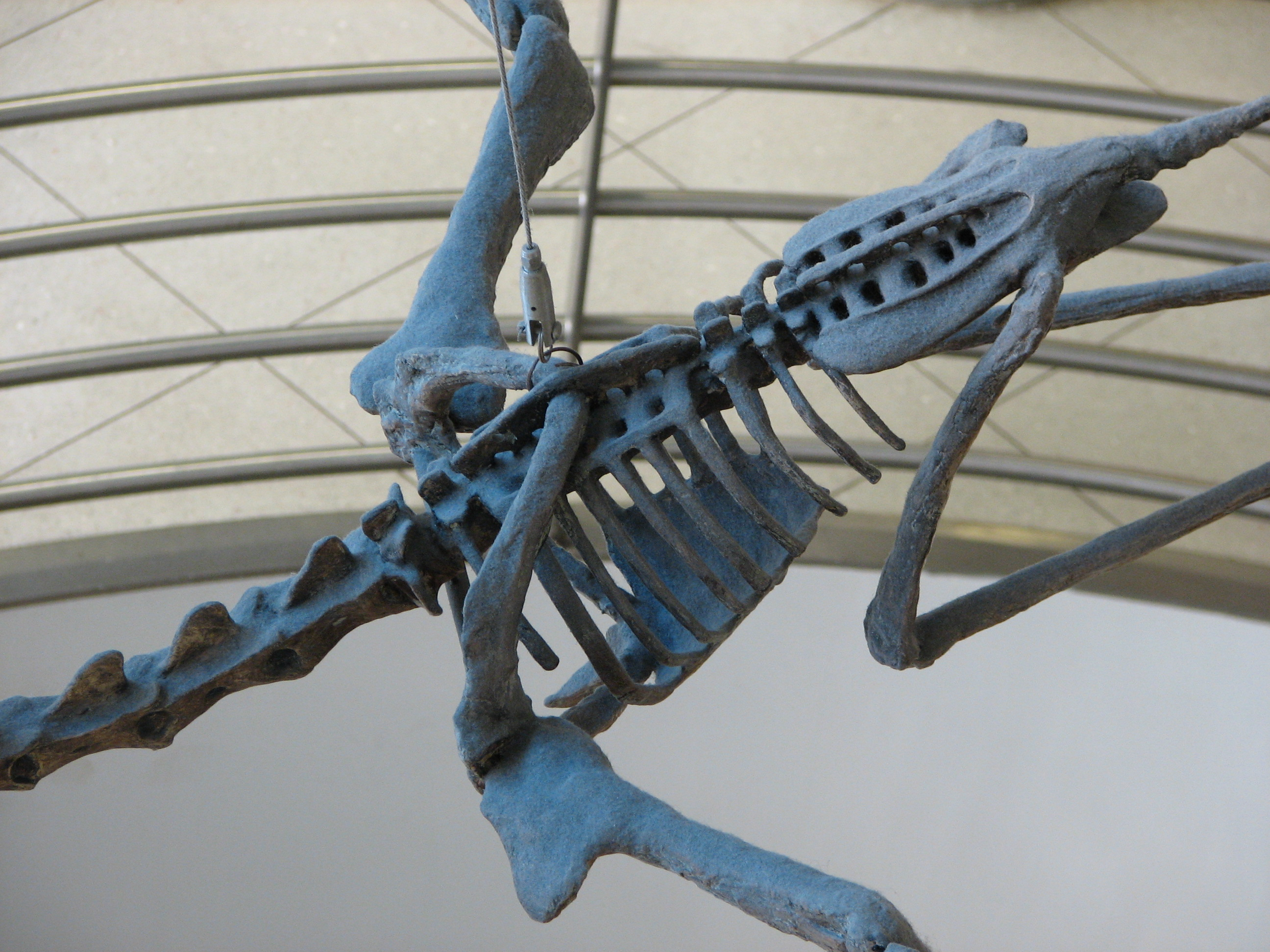
Skeleton of a mounted Pteranodon, showing the notarium between the shoulder blades

Notarium or os dorsale is a bone consisting of the fused vertebra of the shoulder in birds and some pterosaurs. The structure helps brace the chest against the forces generated by the wings. In birds, the vertebrae are only in contact with adjacent vertebrae and ribs, while in some pterosaurs the notarium articulates with the scapula. This joint is unique among tetrapods, as in no other taxa is there a direct connection between the pectoral girdle and vertebral column (though in species with clavicles, the clavicle articulates with the sternum, which in turn is connected to the vertebrae via the ribs, allowing an indirect connection).

Among birds, notarium is found among Galliformes, Columbidae, Tinamidae, Podicipedidae, Phalacrocoracidae, Threskiornithidae, Phoenicopteridae, Falconidae, Gruidae, Aramidae, Psophiidae, Rhinochetidae, Eurypygidae, Mesitornithidae, Pteroclididae, Opisthocomidae and Steatornithidae. It contains 2-6 vertebrae. It probably evolved at least 10 times independently in birds.
