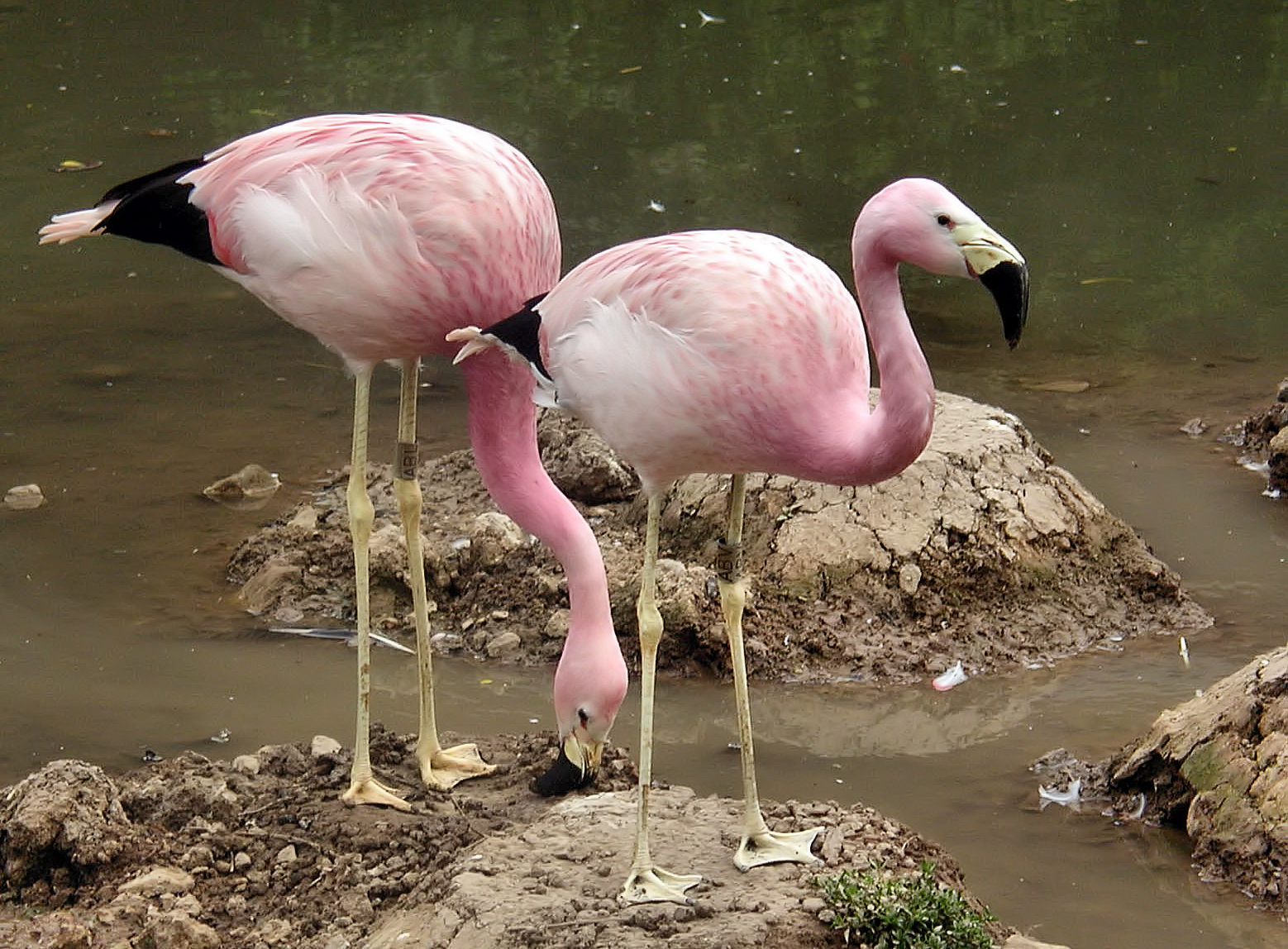
- Andean flamingo (Phoenicoparrus andinus)

Scientific classification
- Kingdom: Animalia
- Phylum: Chordata
- Class: Aves
- Order: Phoenicopteriformes
- Family: Phoenicopteridae
- Genus: Phoenicoparrus; Bonaparte, 1856

Type species
- Phoenicopterus andinus Philippi, 1854

Species
- Phoenicoparrus andinus; Phoenicoparrus jamesi

Synonyms
- Phoeniconaias

= Phoenicoparrus =

Genus of birds

Phoenicoparrus is a genus of birds in the flamingo family Phoenicopteridae. First established by Charles Lucien Bonaparte in 1856, it contains two species.

== Evolution ==
While it is hard to track where the Phoenicoparrus originally came from, there is evidence that it originated in the New World where it split from the other lesser group and into its own genus. The base of the genus is hypothesized to have started with the Andean species. The Phoenicoparrus split from the group around 2.56 million years ago and its two comprising species later split from 0.5-2.5 million years ago. Phoenicoparrus is identified from the rest of its evolutionary group because it is a part of the deep-keeled group, however it is its own genus because both Andean and James's lack a hind toe.

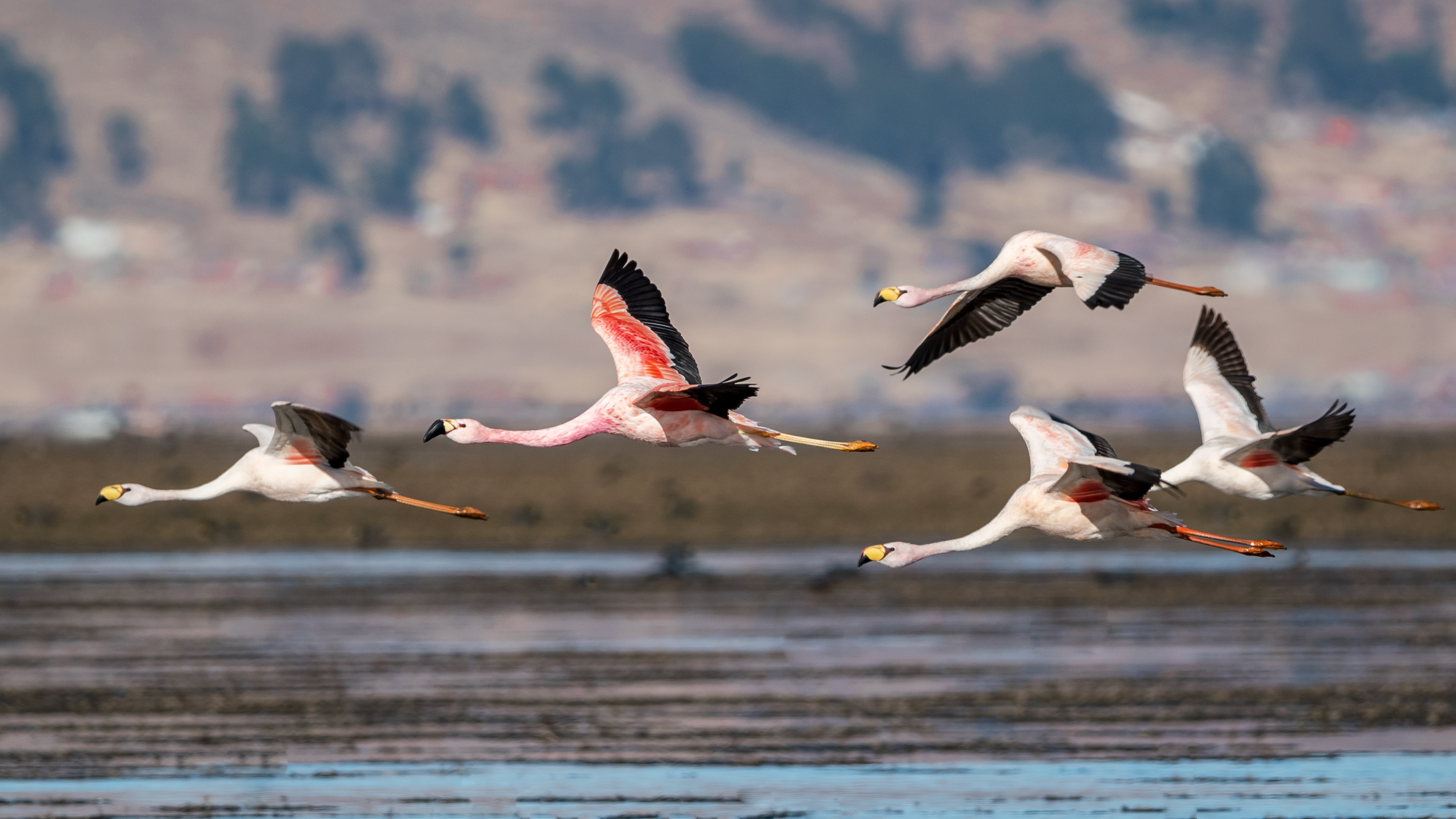
Andean flamingo (center) amidst a flock of James's flamingos

== Diet and Habitat ==
Phoenicoparrus chicks are fed filtered secretions from their parents for the first 4-7 weeks of life. The parents are able to filter sediments from the saline concentrated lakes in the wetlands they typically inhabit. Chicks tend to have higher amounts of arsenic and iron in their bodies, and excessive concentrations can be dangerous. Adults, particularly females, have lower amounts of iron in their bodies because the shells they produce for the chicks have high iron concentrations. Phoenicoparrus are said to eat diatoms and vegetation such as algae because of the deep-keel of their beaks suited for filtration. Both species feed their chicks through crop halocrine secretions that contain a larger amount of lipids than proteins, and it contains some amount of carbohydrates. While both species do not get sucrose in their diets from their parents when they are younger, a lack of sucrose in the body can sometimes be fatal. These species can be found in habitats in southern South America, such as northern Chile.

== Species ==
Genus Phoenicoparrus – Bonaparte, 1856 – two species
Common name	Scientific name and subspecies	Range	Size and ecology	IUCN status and estimated population
Andean flamingo	Phoenicoparrus andinus (Philippi, 1854)	southern Peru to northwestern Argentina and northern Chile	Size: Habitat: Diet:	VU
James's flamingo	Phoenicoparrus jamesi (Sclater, PL, 1886)	Peru, Chile, Bolivia, and Argentina	Size: Habitat: Diet:	NT

== Behavior ==
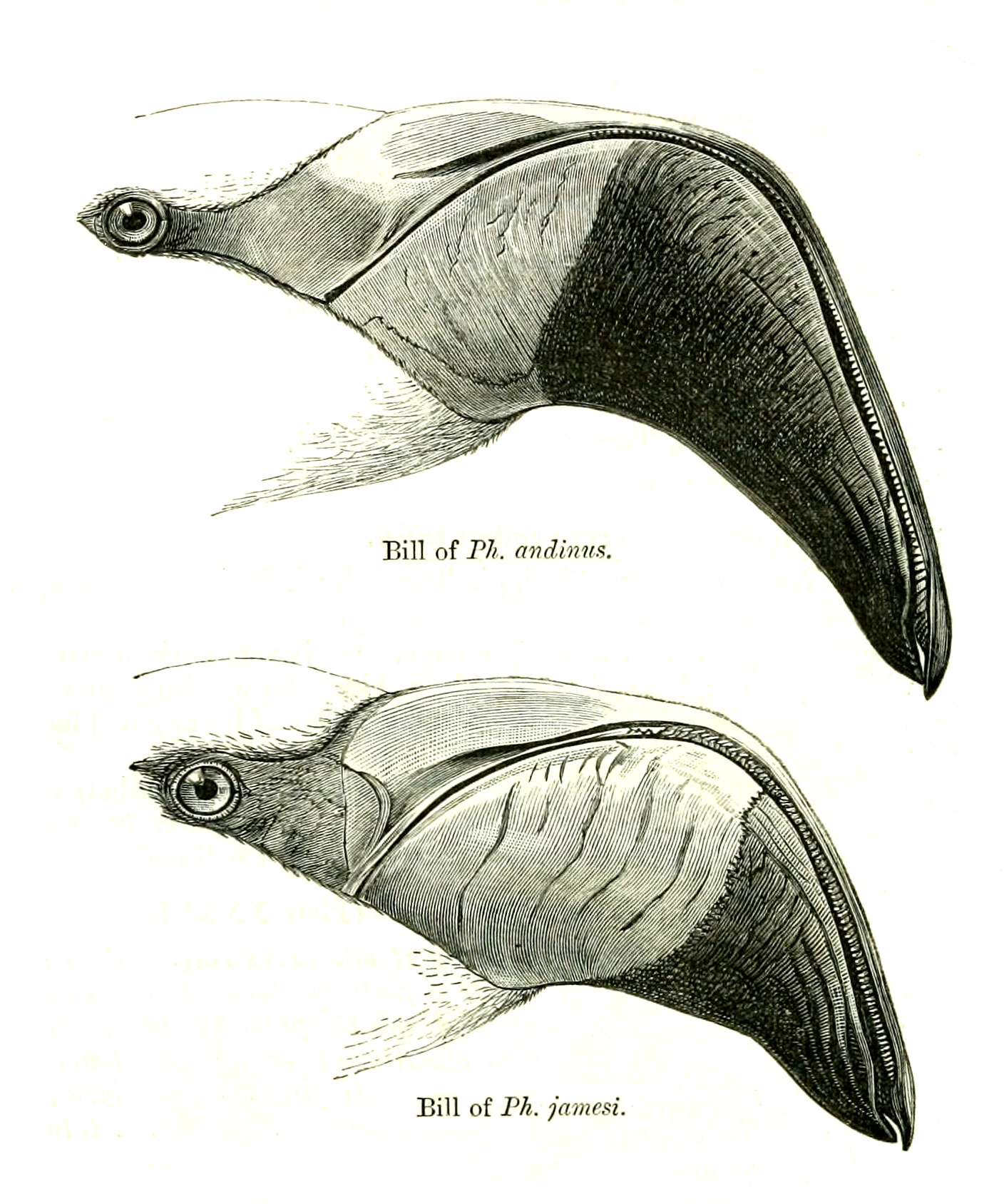
Andean flamingo (top) and James's flamingo (bottom)

Phoenicoparrus spends a majority of its time feeding, but it also spends time moving around, breeding, and cleaning itself. The flamingos are nomadic and tend to choose their habitat based on abundance of food and the waters characteristics. Phoenicoparrus presence and behavior can be affected by human activity such as pollution, mining, illegal hunting, and the collection of eggs. These activities lead to the birds leaving the area or even leaving their nests. The flamingos are also affected by the surface area of the water. The flamingos are present more when the water is high than when the water is low. While Andean and Jame's flamingos comprise the genus Phoenicoparus, both species tend to build nests away from the other respective species. Both species spend the largest amount of their time preening and resting.

== Conservation ==
Phoenicoparrus jamesi is currently considered near threatened while Phoenicoparrus andinus is considered vulnerable. Some techniques that work for protecting the Andean and James's flamingos is to stop poaching, protect their habitat, and educating the public and conserving the flamingos.
