= Saint-Gérand-le-Puy =

- Commune
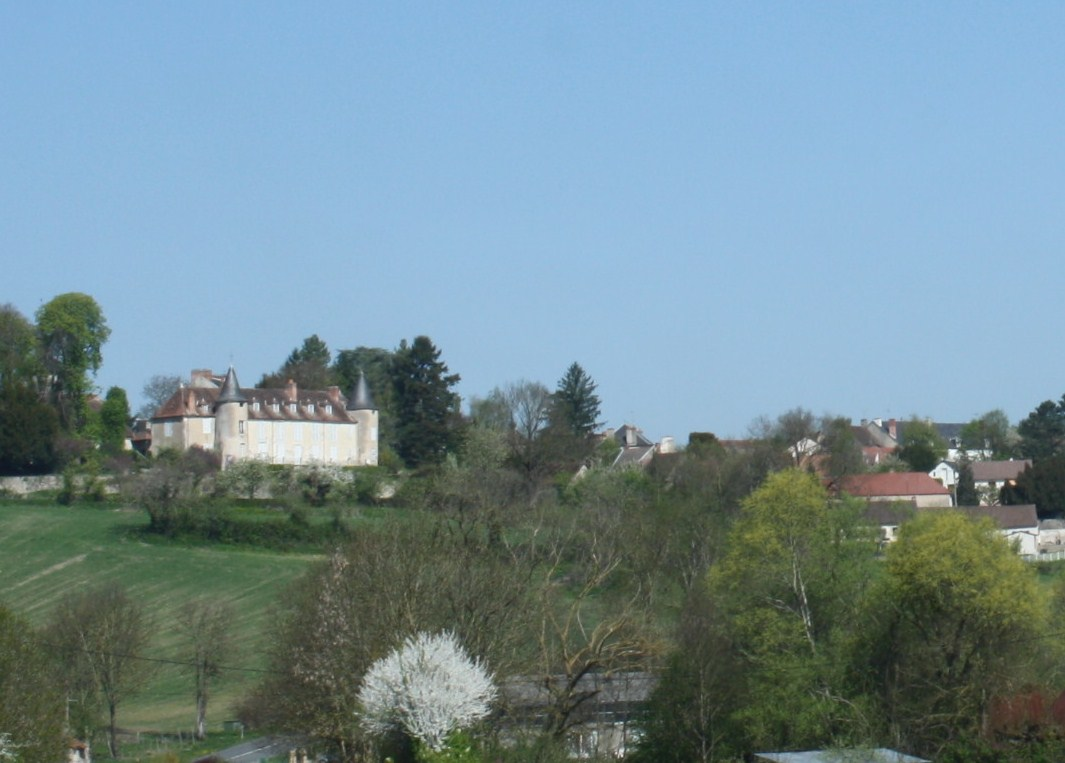
- The chateau and other buildings in Saint-Gérand-le-Puy
- Location of Saint-Gérand-le-Puy
- Location within France Location within Auvergne-Rhône-Alpes
- Coordinates: 46°15′31″N 3°30′46″E
- Country: France
- Region: Auvergne-Rhône-Alpes
- Department: Allier
- Arrondissement: Vichy
- Canton: Saint-Pourçain-sur-Sioule

Government
  - Mayor (2026–32): Frédéric Perraut
- Area^{1}: 19.55 km^{2} (7.55 sq mi)
- Elevation: 325 m (1,066 ft)
- Highest elevation: 359 m (1,178 ft)
- Lowest elevation: 268 m (879 ft)
- Population (2023): 963
  - Density: 49.3/km^{2} (128/sq mi)
- Time zone: UTC+01:00 (CET)
  - Summer (DST): UTC+02:00 (CEST)
- INSEE/Postal code: 03235 /03150
- ^{1} French Land Register data, which excludes lakes, ponds, glaciers > 1 km^{2} (0.386 sq mi or 247 acres) and river estuaries.

Saint-Gérand-le-Puy (French pronunciation: [sɛ̃ ʒeʁɑ̃ lə pɥi]; Occitan: Sant Geran del Puèi) is a commune in the Allier department in Auvergne-Rhône-Alpes in central France.

== Geography ==
Much of the local rock is limestone common in the Auvergne, known as indusial, because of the cases, or indusiae, of the larvae of Phryganea (resembling caddis-flies), which have been encrusted, as they lay, by hard travertine (a white or light-coloured concretionary limestone, usually hard and semi-crystalline, deposited from water holding lime in solution).

The area is rich in fossils, notably birds from the Miocene era. See, for example, Cheneval J (1984), Les oiseaux aquatiques (Gaviiformes à Ansériformes) du gisement aquitanien de Saint-Gérand-le-Puy (Allier} (The aquatic birds (Galliformes to Anseriformes) of the aquitanian deposits of Saint-Gérand-le-Puy (Allier}.

== History ==
A Roman road runs by the town. It was a fortified village in the Middle Ages, deriving strategic importance from its location on the route from Moulins to Lyon.

The town was a stop on the pilgrimage to Santiago de Compostela – a local cross marking the way is shown at .

It belonged to the seigneurie of Montluçon at the beginning of the 13th century but when the le Bourbonnais (part of the Massif Central essentially co-terminous with the modern Allier) became a Duchy in 1327 it passed into of the hands of the Bourbons.

During the French Revolution it was known as Puy-Redan. In 1832, Saint-Étienne-de-Ciernat and Saint-Étienne-du-Bas were joined to the commune and, in 1833, Saint-Allyre-de-Valence followed.

== Administration ==
List of successive mayors

- 1991–2026: Xavier Cadoret (before his naturalization: Karim Kadouri)
- 2026–incumbent: Frédéric Perraut

== Population ==
Historical population
Year	Pop.	±% p.a.
1968	1,143	—
1975	1,121	−0.28%
1982	1,018	−1.37%
1990	1,064	+0.55%
1999	1,029	−0.37%
2007	997	−0.39%
2012	1,014	+0.34%
2017	993	−0.42%
2023	963	−0.51%
Source: INSEE

Its inhabitants are known as Saint-Gérandais in French.

== Sights ==
- The 11th-century Romanesque Church of St Julien
  - Its tower is shown at:;
- Château of Saint-Gérand: The manor is 15th-century;
- Manor of Gondailly is 15th-century with 19th-century reconstruction;
- A dodecahedral washhouse is under restoration;
- The James Joyce Museum is located in a room adjoining the town library.

== Notable people ==
- Alphonse Milne-Edwards (1836–1900), French mammalogist and ornithologist
- James Joyce (1882–1941), Irish novelist and poet

=== The Joyce connection ===
In December 1939, James Joyce, his wife, Nora, and son, Giorgio, made an extended visit to the town to see Giorgio's son, Stephen, a pupil at the bilingual school there. In February 1940, they were visited by Samuel Beckett.

After Easter, they moved for a few months to Vichy, some 20 km (12 mi) away, to see their friend Valery Larbaud. Personal problems, and the imminent German occupation, persuaded them to move to their final port of call, neutral Switzerland, where they arrived on 14 December 1940.

The memory of Joyce has been celebrated for many years in Saint-Gérand-le-Puy, in particular with "le Jour d'Ulysse".

== See also ==
- Communes of the Allier department
