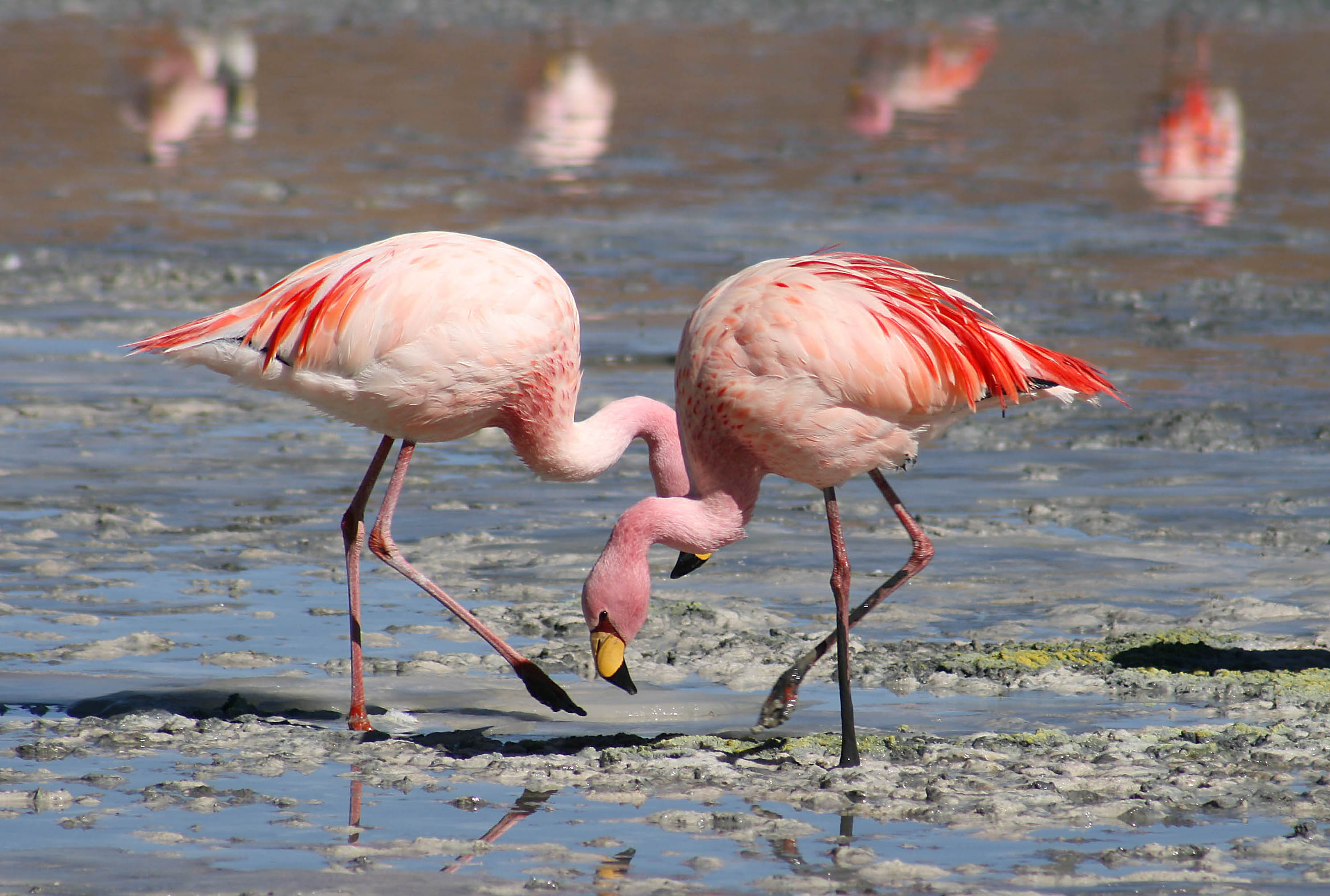
- James's flamingos (Phoenicopterus jamesi)

Scientific classification
- Kingdom: Animalia
- Phylum: Chordata
- Class: Aves
- Clade: Mirandornithes
- Order: Phoenicopteriformes; Fürbringer, 1888

Subclades
- †Agnopterus?; †Juncitarsus?; †Kashinia?; †Scaniornis?; †Palaelodidae; Phoenicopteridae

= Phoenicopteriformes =

Phoenicopteriformes Temporal range: Eocene to recent 50–0 Ma

Order of birds

Phoenicopteriformes /fiːnɪˈkɒptərɪfɔːrmiːz/ is a group of water birds which comprises flamingos and their extinct relatives. Flamingos (Phoenicopteriformes) and the closely related grebes (Podicipedidae) are contained in the parent clade Mirandornithes.

- Neoaves
  - Mirandornithes
    - Phoenicopteriformes
      modern flamingos
    - Podicipediformes
      grebes
  - ... other neoavians ...

== Fossil record ==
Flamingos and their relatives are well attested in the fossil record, with the first unequivocal member of the Phoenicopteridae, Elornis, known from the late Eocene epoch.

=== Relation to extinct palaelodids ===
The Palaelodidae – an extinct family of peculiar "swimming flamingos" – are believed to be the closest relatives of the modern flamingos, with the extinct genus Juncitarsus slightly more primitive than the clade which contains flamingos and grebes (Mirandornithes).

The foot and wing anatomy of fossil palaelodids suggests that they were surface-swimming birds, rather than grebe-like divers as was proposed in the past. Whether swimmers or divers, that both primitive phoenicopteriforms and their closest relatives, the grebes, were highly aquatic, indicates that the entire clade Mirandornithes evolved from aquatic, probably swimming ancestors.

== Etymology ==
The name comes from Ancient Greek φοῖνιξ (phoînix), meaning "crimson", πτερόν (pterón), meaning "feather", and Latin formes, meaning "form".
