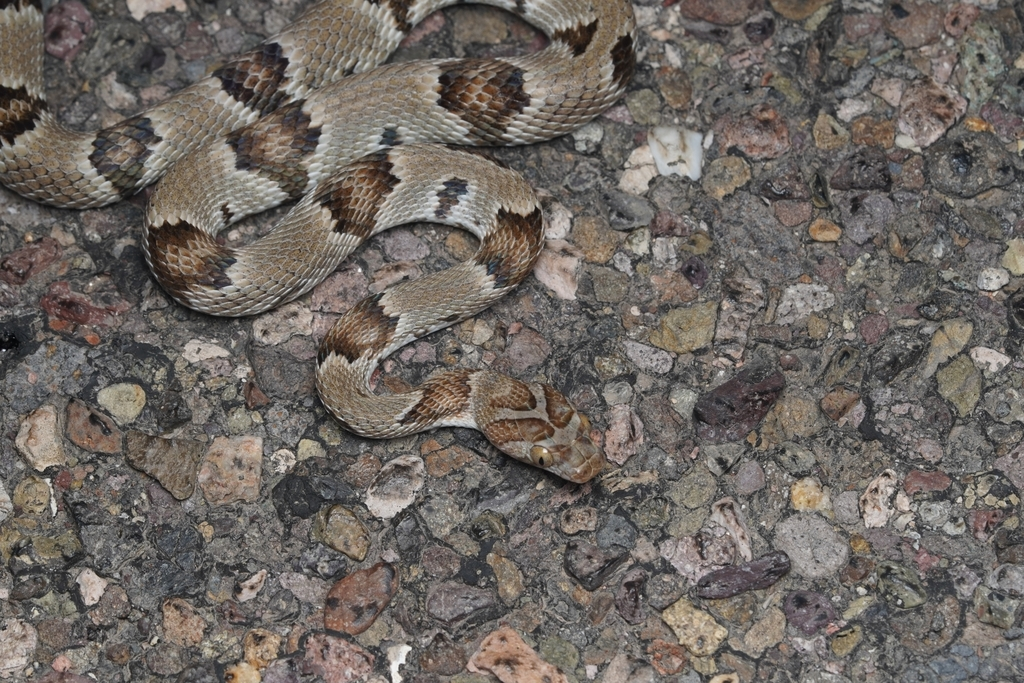
- Sonoran lyre snake in Southwestern USA

Conservation status
- Least Concern (IUCN 3.1)

Scientific classification
- Kingdom: Animalia
- Phylum: Chordata
- Class: Reptilia
- Order: Squamata
- Suborder: Serpentes
- Family: Colubridae
- Genus: Trimorphodon
- Species: T. lambda

Binomial name
- Trimorphodon lambda Cope, 1886
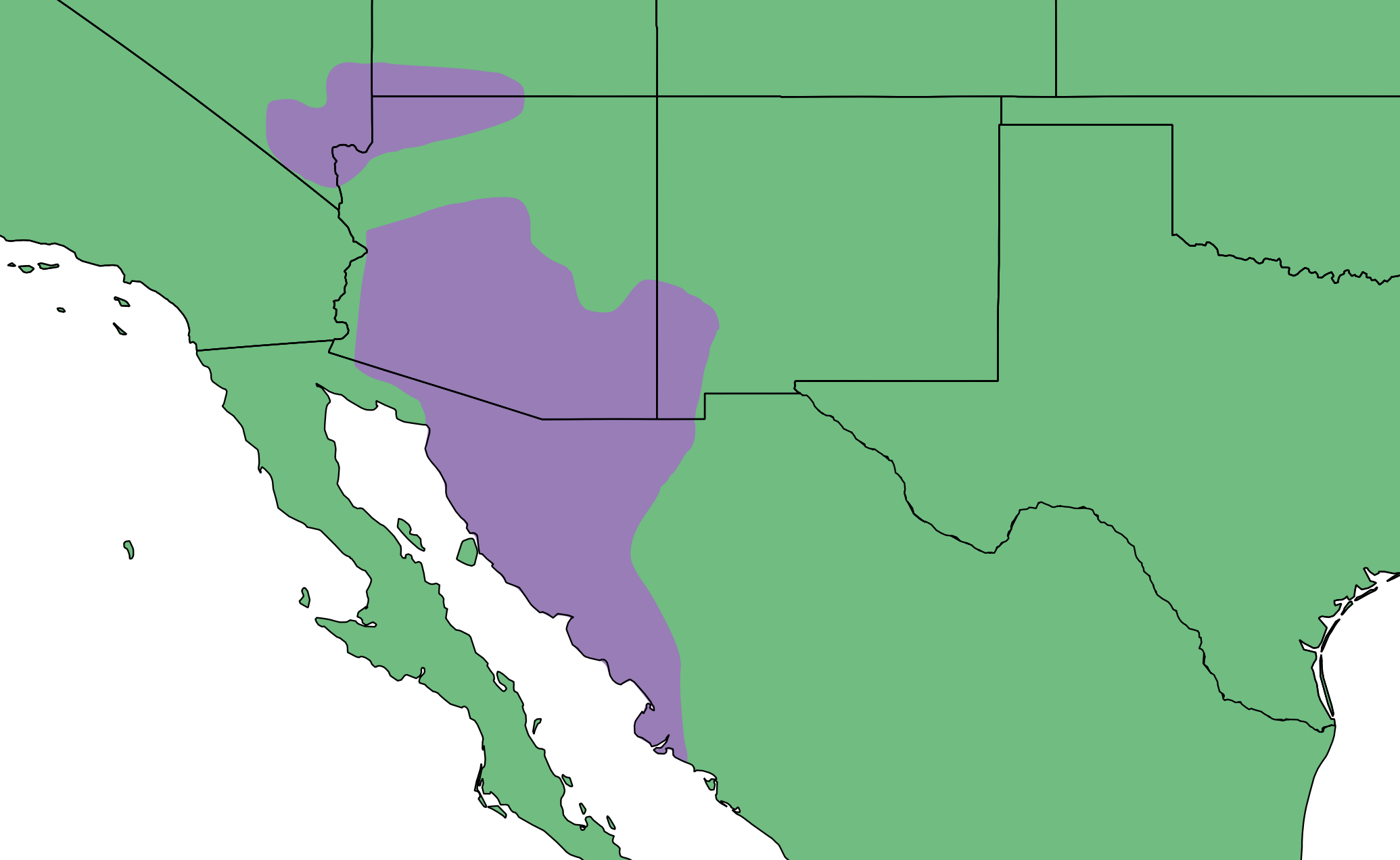

= Trimorphodon lambda =

Species of snake

Trimorphodon lambda, the Sonoran lyre snake, is a species of rear-fanged snake in the family Colubridae. Native to the southwestern United States and northwestern Mexico, the species is best known for the distinctive V-shaped or lyre-like marking on the top of its head. Previously classified as a subspecies of the western lyre snake (Trimorphodon biscutatus), it is now widely recognized as a distinct species.

== Taxonomy and etymology ==
The generic name, Trimorphodon, is derived from Greek and translates to "three-shaped teeth". This refers to the distinct variations of teeth found in the upper jaw: long and recurved front teeth, shorter middle teeth, and elongated, grooved fangs located at the rear of the mouth.

The specific epithet, lambda, refers to the prominent chevron-shaped mark on the snake's head, which resembles the uppercase Greek letter lambda (Λ).

Historically, T. lambda was considered a subspecies of Trimorphodon biscutatus (However, modern multivariate statistical analyses of geographic variation and phylogenetic studies resulted in the elevation of the Sonoran lyre snake to full species status.

== Description ==
The Sonoran lyre snake is a medium to large, slender snake. Snout-to-vent length (SVL) generally ranges from 23 to 88 cm (9 to 34 in), with maximum total lengths occasionally exceeding 1 meter (39 in). It features a broad, flat head that is highly distinct from its comparatively slim neck, and its large eyes possess vertical pupils, characteristic of many nocturnal or crepuscular reptiles.

The snake's ground coloration is typically pale gray, tan, or light brown. Its back is patterned with 18 to 31 dark brown saddles or blotches that feature pale edges and light, divided centers. These dorsal saddles are widest at the midline and taper as they extend down the snake's sides. The tail typically exhibits an additional 8 to 17 blotches. The underside is generally tan, pale yellow, or light gray, with scattered dark flecks near the edges. In addition to the defining "lambda" mark on the crown of the head, individuals usually exhibit a dark bar stretching across the snout between the eyes.

== Distribution and habitat ==
The geographic range of Trimorphodon lambda covers portions of the American Southwest and northwestern Mexico. In the United States, it is found throughout Arizona, southern Nevada, southwestern Utah, southern New Mexico, and in extreme southeastern California along the Colorado River. In Mexico, its range extends into the states of Sonora and northwestern Chihuahua.

Sonoran lyre snakes are heavily associated with rocky environments. They are typically found in rocky canyons, hillsides, and arroyos up to elevations of about 2,250 m (7,380 ft). The species inhabits a variety of biomes, including Mojave Desert scrub, Sonoran and Chihuahuan desert scrub, semidesert grasslands, and pinyon-juniper woodlands.

Highly secretive by nature, they are most often found sheltering deep inside rock crevices or beneath large boulders. The species exhibits a degree of arboreality; they are adept climbers capable of navigating steep, rocky cliffs and occasionally scaling trees or shrubs to seek shelter or prey.

== Behavior and ecology ==
=== Diet ===
Trimorphodon lambda is primarily nocturnal. The bulk of its diet consists of lizards, which it actively hunts among rocks and crevices. However, as an opportunistic predator, it will also consume small mammals (including mice and bats), nestling birds, and occasionally other small snakes.

=== Venom ===
As a rear-fanged (opisthoglyphous) species, the Sonoran lyre snake is venomous. Its venom is relatively mild and specifically adapted to immobilize the small, agile lizards and mammals that comprise its diet. To humans, the venom is generally considered harmless; a bite from a lyre snake may cause mild, localized pain and swelling, but it is not medically significant. Due to the rear placement of the fangs, the snake must typically "chew" on its target to effectively envenomate it.

=== Reproduction ===
The Sonoran lyre snake is oviparous (egg-laying). Breeding typically occurs in the spring, often coinciding with increased activity during seasonal rains. Females will lay a clutch of 7 to 20 eggs during the summer months. The eggs incubate in hidden, protected environments and hatch in late summer to early fall.

== Conservation status ==
Currently, the IUCN Red List assesses Trimorphodon lambda as a species of Least Concern. The population is considered stable, owing to its expansive geographic range, presumed large population size, and relatively remote, rocky habitats that are generally isolated from heavy human development.
