= Jan Thiel Lagoon, Curaçao =

Saline wetland on Curaçao in the Dutch Caribbean

Coordinates: 12°05′26″N 68°53′02″W

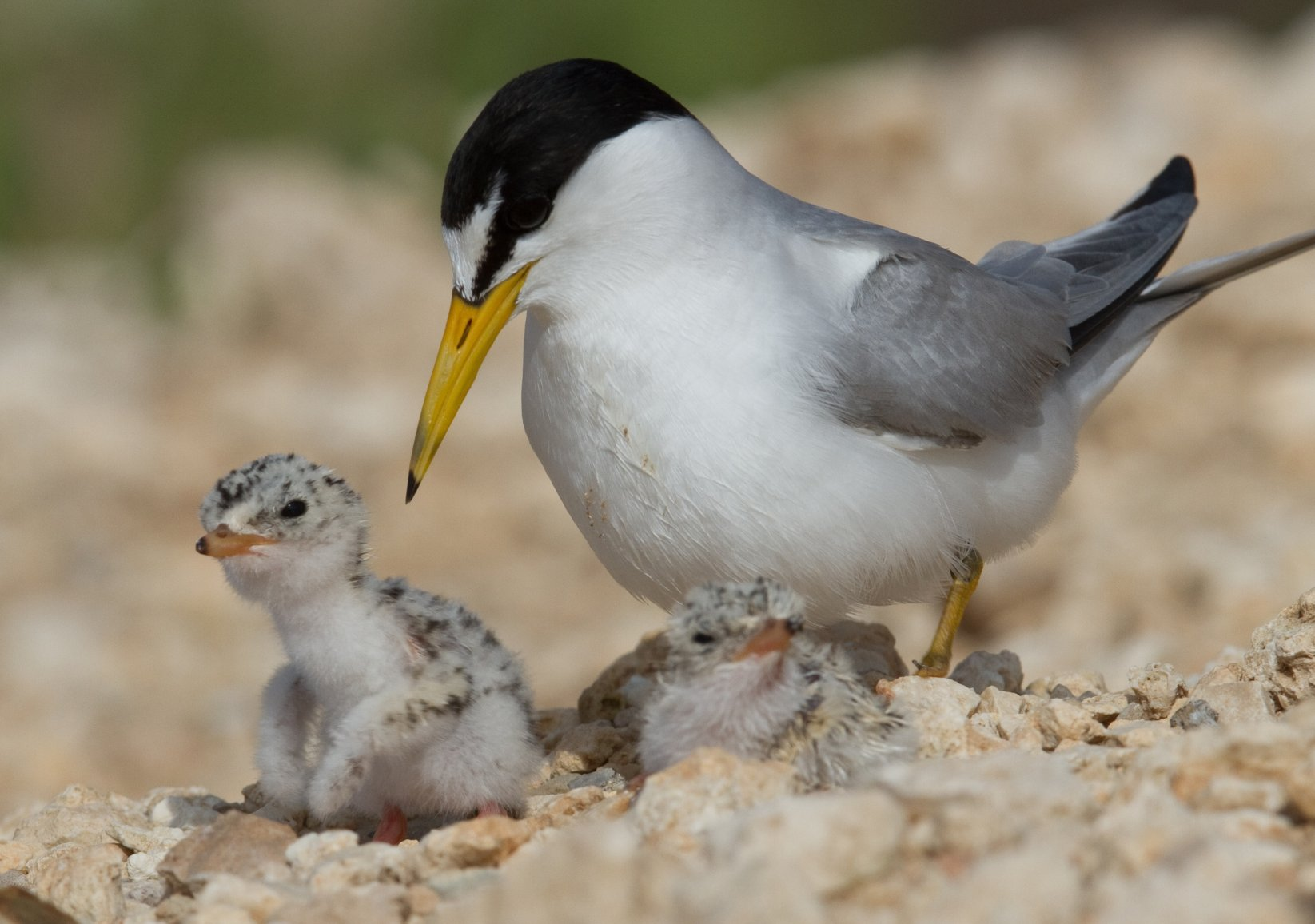
Least terns breed at the lagoon

Jan Thiel Lagoon is an 80 ha area of hypersaline lagoons, surrounded by woodland, on the southern coast of Curaçao, a constituent island nation of the Kingdom of the Netherlands in the Dutch Caribbean. It is adjacent to the capital, Willemstad. The site, comprising the lagoons, woodland and adjacent coastal waters, has been identified as a 432 ha Important Bird Area by BirdLife International. Birds for which the site was designated include breeding colonies of least and common terns. It is also an important foraging area for American flamingos.
