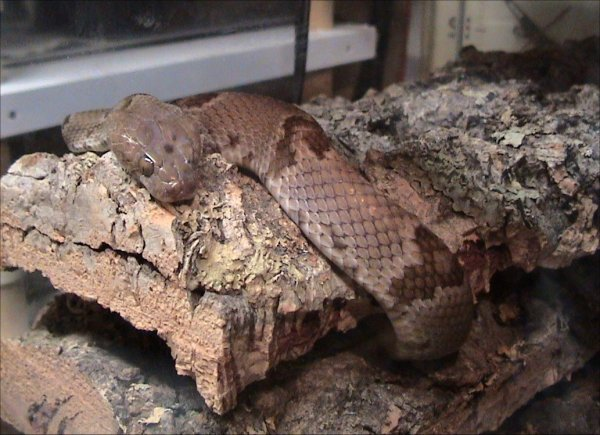

Conservation status
- Least Concern (IUCN 3.1)

Scientific classification
- Kingdom: Animalia
- Phylum: Chordata
- Class: Reptilia
- Order: Squamata
- Suborder: Serpentes
- Family: Colubridae
- Genus: Trimorphodon
- Species: T. vilkinsonii

Binomial name
- Trimorphodon vilkinsonii Cope, 1886

Synonyms
- Trimorphodon vilkinsonii Cope, 1886; Trimorphodon upsilon Günther, 1895; Trimorphodon biscutatus vilkinsonii — Gehlbach, 1971; Trimorphodon lambda vilkinsoni — Werler & Dixon, 2000; Trimorphodon vilkinsonii — Wallach et al., 2014

= Texas lyre snake =

Species of snake

The Texas lyre snake (Trimorphodon vilkinsonii) is a species of mildly venomous, rear-fanged snake in the family Colubridae. The species is endemic to the southwestern United States and adjacent northern Mexico.

== Etymology ==
The epithet vilkinsonii is in honor of amateur American naturalist Edward Wilkinson, who collected the first specimen near the city of Chihuahua.

== Geographic range ==
T. vilkinsonii is found in the United States in the Big Bend region of Texas and southern New Mexico, and in Mexico in northeastern Chihuahua.

== Habitat ==
The preferred natural habitats of T. vilkinsonii are desert and rocky areas.

== Description ==
The Texas lyre snake is a medium-sized snake, attaining a total length (including tail) of approximately 1 meter (39 inches) at adult size. It is brown, tan or gray with 17-24 dark brown blotches down the back. It has large eyes with vertical pupils. The common name, "lyre snake", refers to a distinctive V-shaped pattern on the head which resembles the shape of a lyre. However, this particular subspecies (T. b. vilkinsonii ) has no V mark on the head.

== Behavior ==
Lyre snakes of the genus Trimorphodon are nocturnal, spending most of their time hiding in rock crevices, emerging to feed mainly on lizards, and also on small rodents, frogs, bats and birds. Their venom is not considered to be harmful to humans. Also, if their venom is not fatal to their prey, they may kill by constriction.

== Conservation ==
The Texas lyre snake was formerly listed as Threatened in Texas, but was removed from the list in 2020. This species is secretive and often difficult to find, but is seemingly common throughout its habitat, much of which is in protected or private land.

== Reproduction ==
Lyre snakes are oviparous, laying about a dozen eggs per clutch.
