= Trimorphodon paucimaculatus =

Scientific classification
- Kingdom: Animalia
- Phylum: Chordata
- Class: Reptilia
- Order: Squamata
- Suborder: Serpentes
- Family: Colubridae
- Genus: Trimorphodon
- Species: T. paucimaculatus

Binomial name
- Trimorphodon paucimaculatus Taylor, 1936

Species of snake

Trimorphodon paucimaculatus, the Sinaloan lyre snake, is a species of snake of the family Colubridae.

The snake is found in Mexico.
