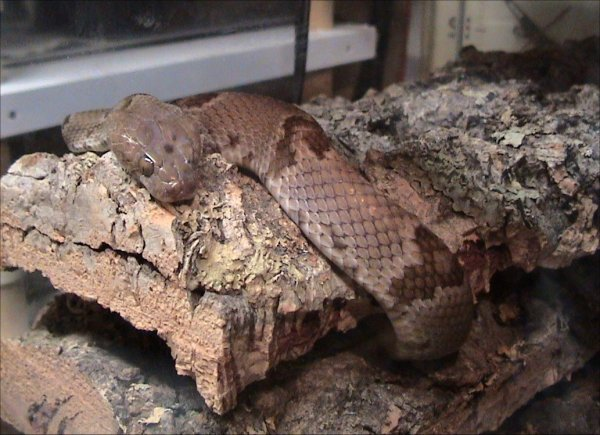
- Texas Lyre Snake, Trimorphodon biscutatus vilkinsonii

Scientific classification
- Kingdom: Animalia
- Phylum: Chordata
- Class: Reptilia
- Order: Squamata
- Suborder: Serpentes
- Family: Colubridae
- Subfamily: Colubrinae
- Genus: Trimorphodon; Cope, 1861

Synonyms
- Eteirodipsas, Lycodon

= Trimorphodon =

Lyre Snakes

Genus of snakes

Trimorphodon is a genus of mildly venomous, rear-fanged, colubrid snakes. They are commonly known as lyre snakes, named after the distinctive V-shaped pattern on their head that is said to resemble the shape of a lyre. In Mexico, they are commonly called "víbora de uña," or "nail viper." The word Trimorphodon is a combination of three Greek words, 'tri' - three, 'morph' - shape, and 'odon' - teeth, which refers to the three distinct kinds of teeth that lyre snakes have: recurved anterior teeth; shorter middle teeth, and large grooved fangs at the rear of the jaw. There are seven distinct species in the genus Trimorphodon.

== Range ==
Trimorphodon biscutatus ranges throughout the southwestern United States, from Texas to California as well as into northern Mexico. Trimorphodon tau ranges through most of Mexico, and down into Central America, in Guatemala, El Salvador, Honduras, Nicaragua, and as far south as Costa Rica. They are primarily found in rocky crevices and outcroppings.

== Description ==
Lyre snakes usually grow to about 1m at adult size. They have a broad head with a narrow neck and large eyes with vertical pupils. They are tan or brown in color, with distinctive black or dark brown bands that have lighter colored borders.

== Behavior ==
Trimorphodon species are primarily nocturnal, and feed on lizards, rodents and even bats. They are a very secretive species, and excellent climbers. They live inside rock crevices and canyon walls where humans cannot easily find them, which makes research difficult.

== Reproduction ==
They are oviparous, laying clutches of 10 or more eggs. Hybridization between species is not unknown in the areas where their range overlaps.

== Speed ==
There is no information on this category.

== Venom ==
Their venom is not considered to be dangerous to humans.

== Species ==
- Western lyre snake, Trimorphodon biscutatus (Duméril, Bibron & Duméril, 1854)
- Sonoran lyre snake, Trimorphodon lambda Cope, 1886
- Baja California lyre snake, Trimorphodon lyrophanes (Cope, 1860)
- Sinaloan lyre snake, Trimorphodon paucimaculatus Taylor, 1938
- Central American lyre snake, Trimorphodon quadruplex (Smith, 1941)
- Mexican lyre snake, Trimorphodon tau Cope, 1870
  - Trimorphodon tau latifascia (Peters, 1869)
  - Trimorphodon tau tau Cope, 1870
- Texas lyre snake, Trimorphodon vilkinsonii (Cope, 1886)
