= Edward Wilkinson (naturalist) =

Edward Wilkinson (1846–1918) was an American naturalist and museum curator.

== Life ==
He was born in Mansfield, Ohio; his father was the Rev James Wilkinson and his mother Jane Wilkinson. His early career was as a sheetmetal worker. He was interested in natural history from a young age but had no formal training in the subject, gaining in competence as he devoted his leisure time to the study.

Wilkinson fought in the American Civil War between 1861 and 1865 before returning to his original occupation. In 1873, an opportunity arose to visit Mexico, where he joined his brother who was a mining engineer in Batopilas, Chihuahua. He stayed there for two years, working with his brother but also spending much time collecting specimens of the indigenous flora and fauna. He sent about five hundred reptile specimens to the herpetologist Edward Drinker Cope.

In 1875, Wilkinson returned to Mansfield because of his mother's state of health. Here he collected cultural, historic, military and scientific objects of interest from early settlements in Ohio. He made a shorter trip to Mexico in 1885, where he made extensive collections of items of interest to be found in the vicinity of Chihuahua. By 1891, with an additional contribution from Dr. J.R. Craig, he had amassed a sufficiently large collection to establish the Mansfield Memorial Museum of which he became curator. This was his full-time occupation for the next fourteen years, and he catalogued, arranged, identified and displayed the exhibits, building most of the display cases and cabinets himself. He retired from this post in 1905 and died in 1918. The museum is still in existence and houses collections of Native American relics, artifacts from Africa and Asia, military objects, and natural history items.

The Natural History Museum, London houses a collection of Spermatophytes made by Wilkinson.

The Texas lyre snake (Trimorphodon biscutatus vilkinsonii), a subspecies of the western lyre snake (Trimorphodon biscutatus), is a colubrid snake that was named in Wilkinson's honor by Edward Drinker Cope in 1866. Wilkinson had collected the first specimen in Chihuahua. Some authorities consider it to be a species (Trimorphodon vilkinsonii) in its own right.
