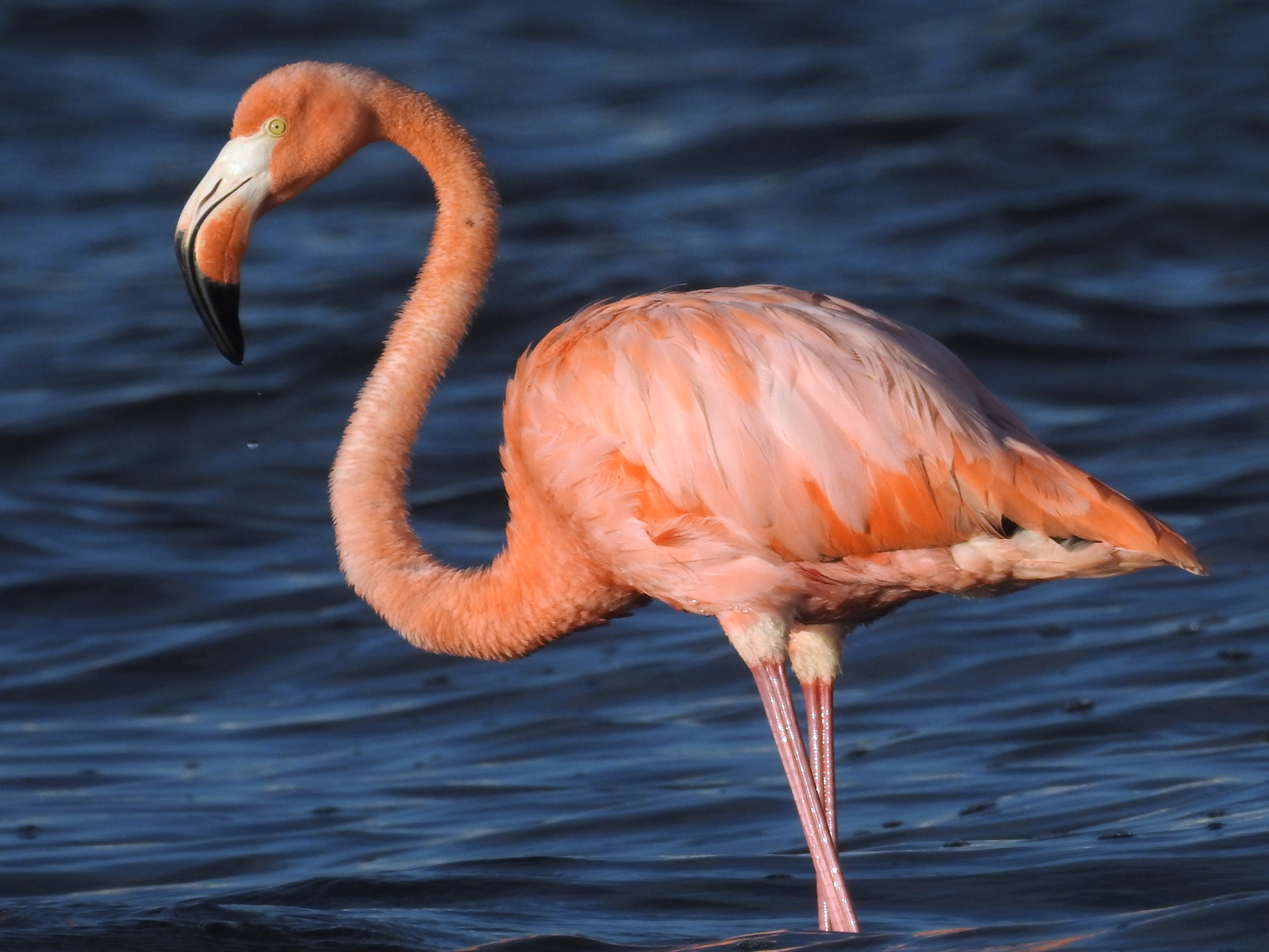
- Adult at Clearwater Beach, Florida
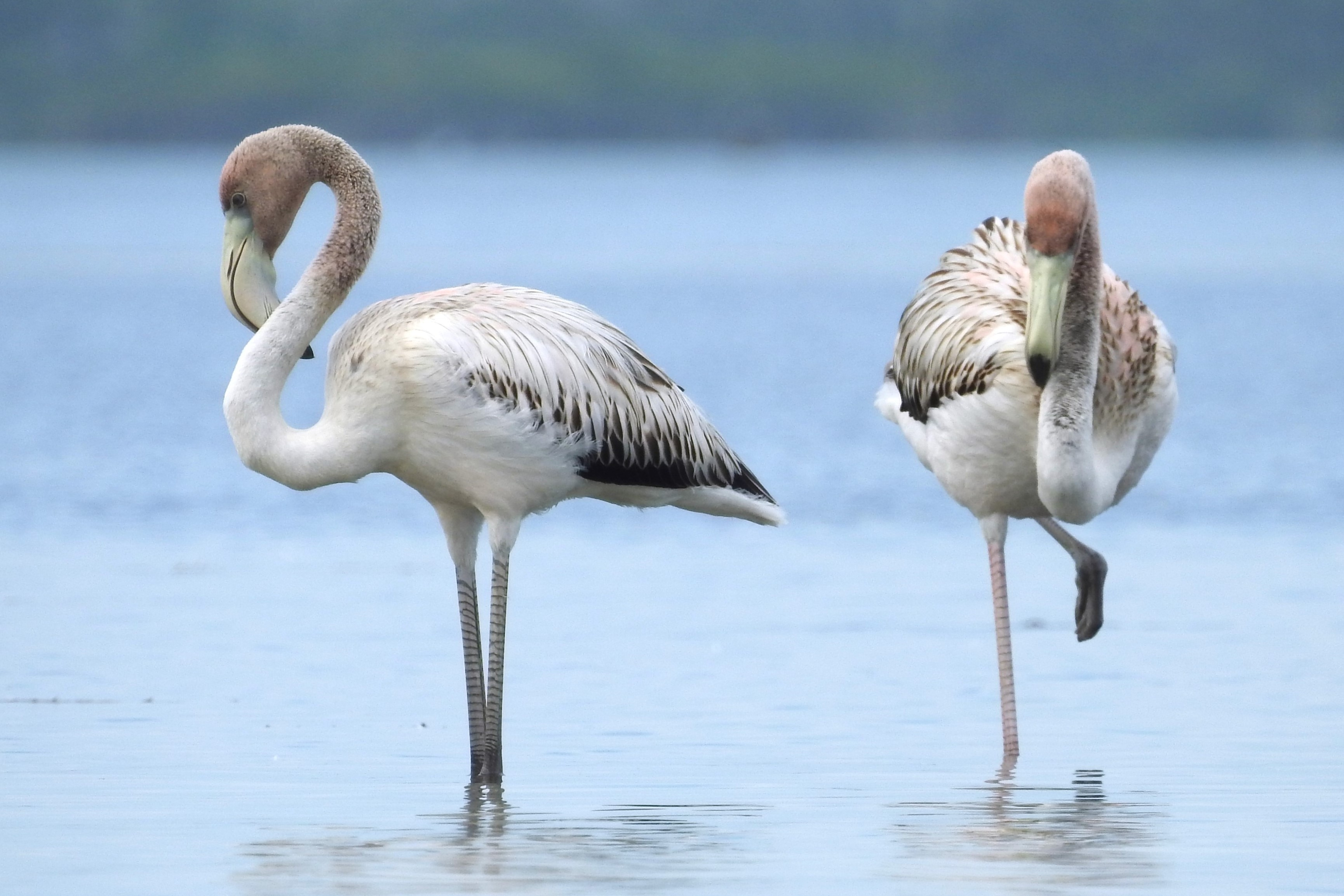
- 2 juveniles at Cape Canaveral, Florida

Conservation status
- Least Concern (IUCN 3.1)
- CITES Appendix II

Scientific classification
- Kingdom: Animalia
- Phylum: Chordata
- Class: Aves
- Order: Phoenicopteriformes
- Family: Phoenicopteridae
- Genus: Phoenicopterus
- Species: P. ruber

Binomial name
- Phoenicopterus ruber Linnaeus, 1758
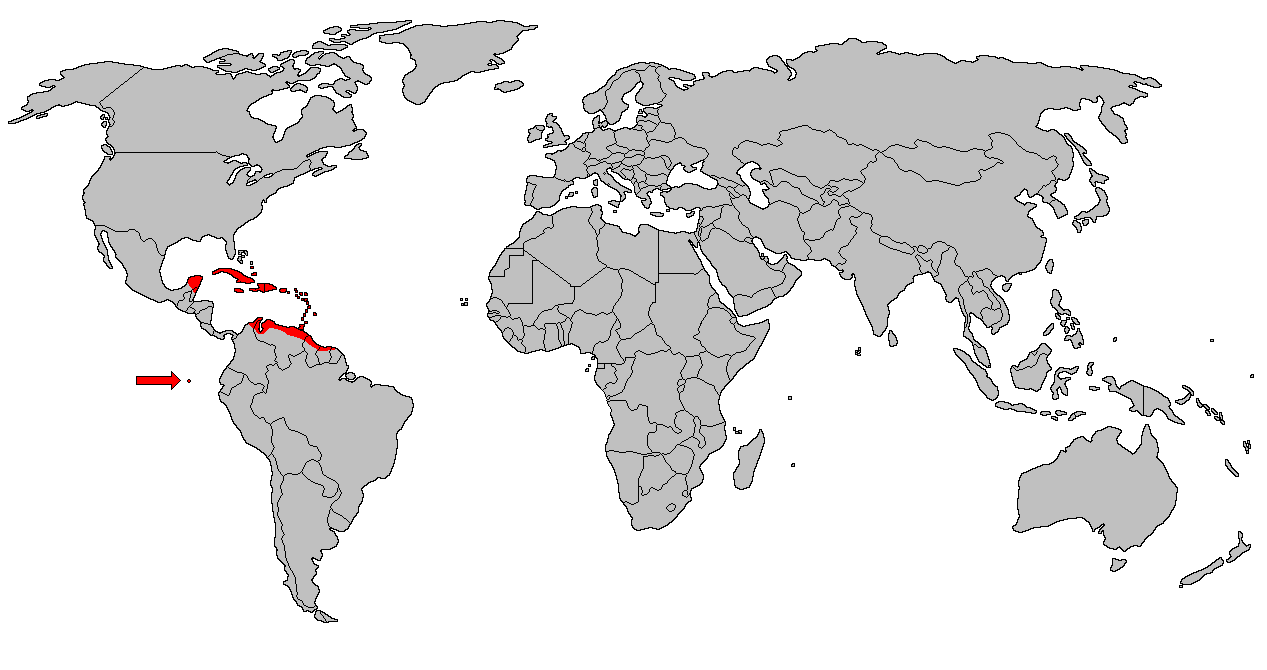
- current range

Synonyms
- Phoenicopterus ruber ruber

= American flamingo =

Species of bird

The American flamingo (Phoenicopterus ruber) is a large species of flamingo native to the West Indies, northern South America (including the Galápagos Islands) and the Yucatán Peninsula. It is closely related to the greater flamingo and Chilean flamingo, and was formerly considered conspecific with the greater flamingo, but that treatment is now widely viewed (e.g. by the American and British Ornithologists' Unions) as incorrect due to a lack of evidence. It is also known as the Caribbean flamingo, although it is also present in the Galápagos Islands. It is the only flamingo that naturally inhabits North America.

It is a cultural icon for the U.S. state of Florida, where it was formerly abundant in the southernmost regions, although it was largely extirpated by 1900 and is now only an uncommon visitor with a few small, potentially resident populations.

== Taxonomy ==
The American flamingo was formally described in 1758 by the Swedish naturalist Carl Linnaeus in the tenth edition of his Systema Naturae under the current binomial name Phoenicopterus ruber. Linnaeus cited earlier authors including the English naturalist Mark Catesby who in 1729–1731 had described and illustrated the flamingo found on the Bahamas islands. Linnaeus specified the type locality as "Africa, America, rarius in Europe" but the locality was restricted to the Bahamas by the German ornithologist Hans von Berlepsch in 1908. The genus name Phoenicopterus is the Latin word for a flamingo. The specific epithet ruber is Latin meaning "red". The greater flamingo (Phoenicopterus roseus), that is widespread in the Old World, was formerly treated as a subspecies of the American flamingo. Molecular phylogenetic studies have shown that the two taxa are each other's closest relatives.

Two subspecies are recognised:

- P. r. ruber Linnaeus, 1758 – Caribbean to northeast Brazil
- P. r. glyphorhynchus Gray, GR, 1869 – Galápagos Islands

== Distribution ==
The American flamingo breeds in South America (in the Galápagos Islands of Ecuador, coastal Colombia and Venezuela, and northern Brazil), in the West Indies (Trinidad and Tobago, Cuba, Jamaica, Hispaniola (the Dominican Republic and Haiti), The Bahamas, the Virgin Islands, and the Turks and Caicos Islands), and tropical and subtropical areas of continental North America (along the northern coast of the Yucatán Peninsula in Mexico, and formerly southern Florida in the United States). It is a vagrant to Puerto Rico, Anguilla, Barbados, Honduras, and (following its extirpation) Florida, although some Florida populations are now thought to be year-round residents. The population in the Galápagos Islands differs genetically from that in the Caribbean; the Galápagos flamingos are significantly smaller, exhibit sexual dimorphism in body shape, and lay smaller eggs. They are sometimes separated as Phoenicopterus ruber glyphorhynchus.

Marine biologists say that, although flamingos are native to the tropical south of the U.S., hurricanes have been known to drive flocks of flamingos north, leading to rare sightings in Kentucky, New York, Ohio, Pennsylvania and Virginia. Most of the birds return to where they came from, but occasionally, one breaks off from a flock so that there are examples of a flamingo hanging out by itself for years.

Its preferred habitats are similar to those of its relatives: saline lagoons, mudflats, and shallow, brackish coastal or inland lakes. An example habitat is the Petenes mangroves ecoregion of the Yucatán.

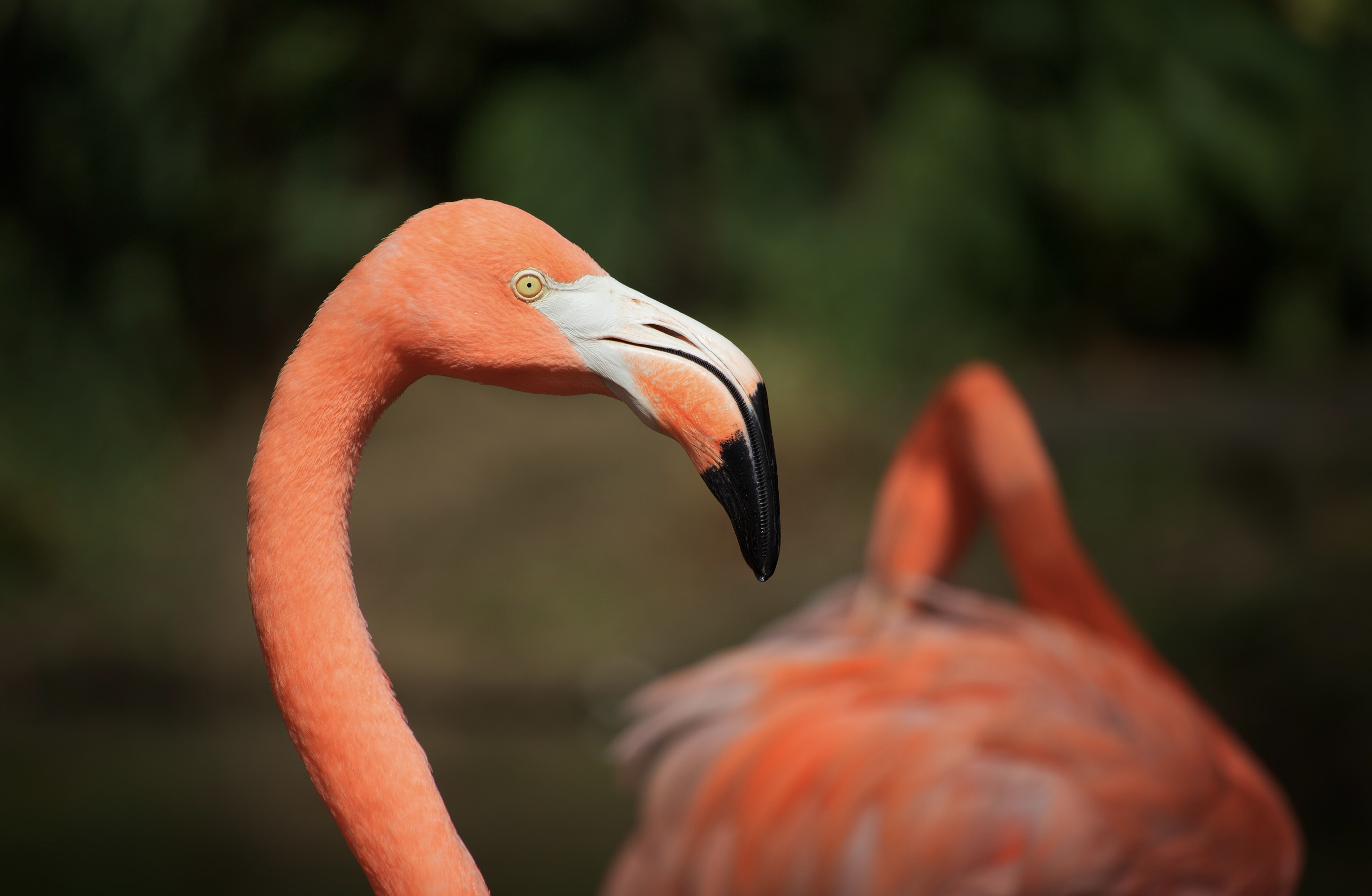
American flamingo in Colombia

=== In Florida ===
The American flamingo is considered an iconic symbol of the state of Florida in the United States, and is widely featured on merchandise from the state. Although the species was a former resident and a possible breeder in Florida until the early 20th century, the strong association of flamingos with Florida likely originates from the Flamingo Hotel, a popular 1920s hotel in Miami Beach, which was named after an exotic bird for marketing purposes. The hotel's strong association with South Florida led to the popularity of flamingo souvenirs from the state, which was further boosted by the captive flamingos kept in Hialeah Park.

South Florida and the Florida Keys were likely the northernmost strongholds of the American flamingo's distribution until they suffered a population collapse around 1900. Large flocks of flamingos reaching up to a thousand individuals (with one potential sighting of up to 2,500 individuals) were sighted throughout the 19th century by naturalists such as John James Audubon and John George F. Wurdemann although such spectacles were restricted to a small portion of southern and western Florida, at sites including Marco Island, Cape Sable and the Florida Keys. Many of these early reports note that Florida's flamingos suffered from heavy hunting, first by Native Americans and later early settlers; this hunting may have already affected numbers prior the earliest population estimates. The last report of a large flock was by Reginald Heber Howe (1902), who reported a flock of over 500 to 1,000 flamingos east of Cape Sable. Following this report, flamingo observations in Florida only ranged in the single digits at a time for many decades.

A small number of museum specimens exist of flamingo eggs allegedly collected in Florida, all from the 1880s. Three of these (including one collected by Edward Wilkinson) are labeled as originating from the Florida Keys, while one is labeled as having been collected around Tampa. However, none of these specimens have specific collection notes, and the provenance of the Tampa specimen is considered highly erroneous. However, the collection dates are consistent with nesting seasons for other American flamingo populations, bolstering their accuracy. There is a single potential sight record of nesting flamingos in Florida: a 1901 report from a Keys resident mentions a flock of 40–50 flamingos on Sugarloaf Key standing by "whitish stumps", which may potentially refer to the flamingos' mud nests. Despite the ambiguity of these reports, the geomorphology of these sites closely resembles that of flamingo nesting sites elsewhere in the Caribbean, supporting their accuracy. It is thus largely agreed that flamingos were likely former nesters in Florida.

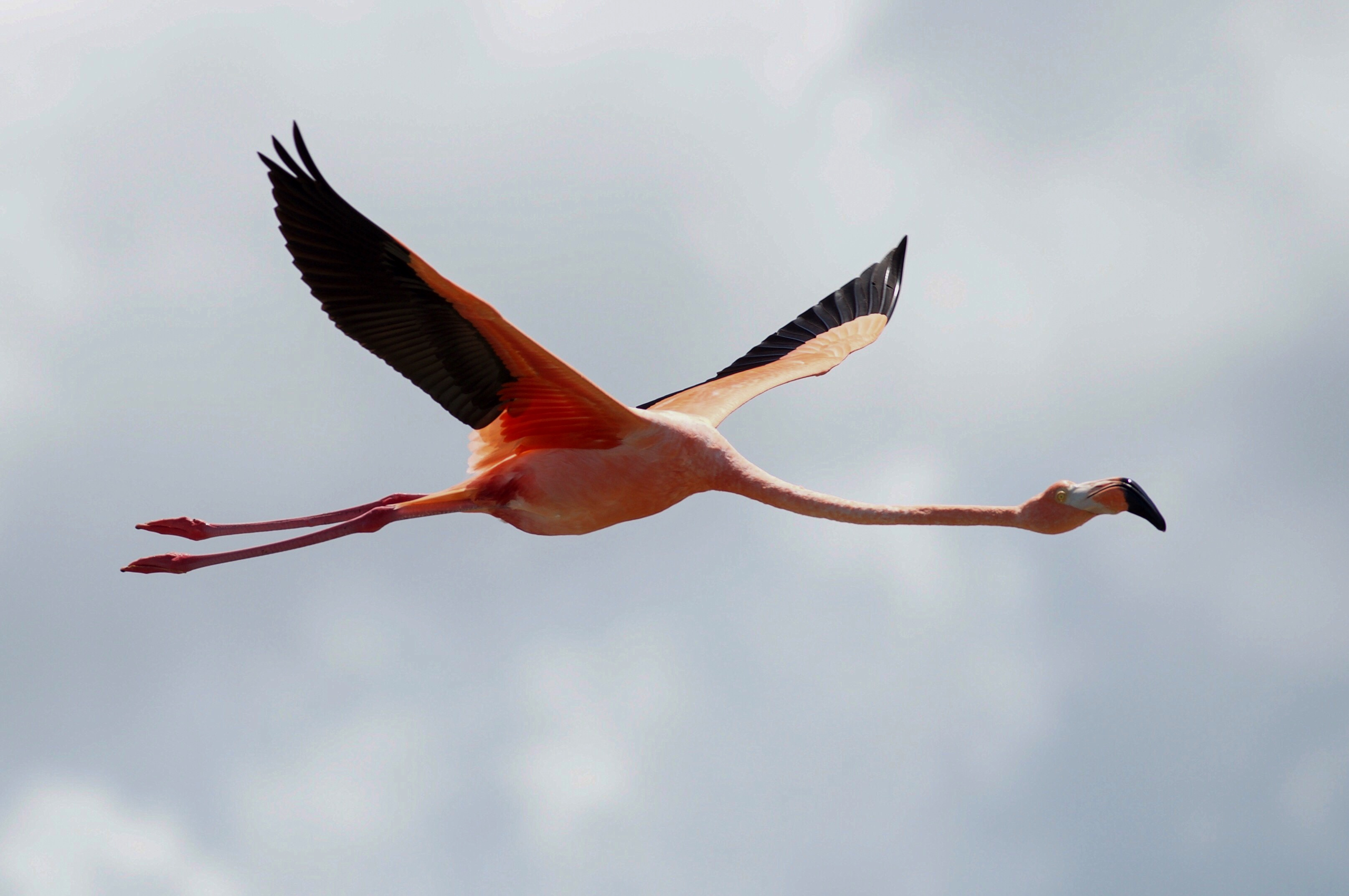
A wild American flamingo in Florida Bay, Everglades National Park. Some Florida Bay birds are thought to be year-round residents

Sightings of flamingos in Florida had reached a low by the 1940s, with no registered records for the entire decade. During the 1950s, wild flamingo sightings started to tick up again, but birds from the captive population at Hialeah Park frequently escaped, leading to the conclusion that the majority of flamingo sightings in Florida were of escapees; until 2018, the Florida Fish and Wildlife Conservation Commission listed it as a nonnative species. From a distance, untrained eyes can also confuse it with the roseate spoonbill, leading to further confusion. This belief persisted into the 21st century even as flamingo sightings started to become more and more frequent, although at least one bird banded as a chick in the Yucatán Peninsula was recorded in 2012 in Everglades National Park. The maximum sizes of observed flocks also increased over time, with the largest increase between 1990 and 2015. The largest flock of Florida flamingos since the early 20th century was spotted in 2014, when a very large flock of over 147 flamingos temporarily stayed at Stormwater Treatment Area 2 on Lake Okeechobee, with a few returning the following year.

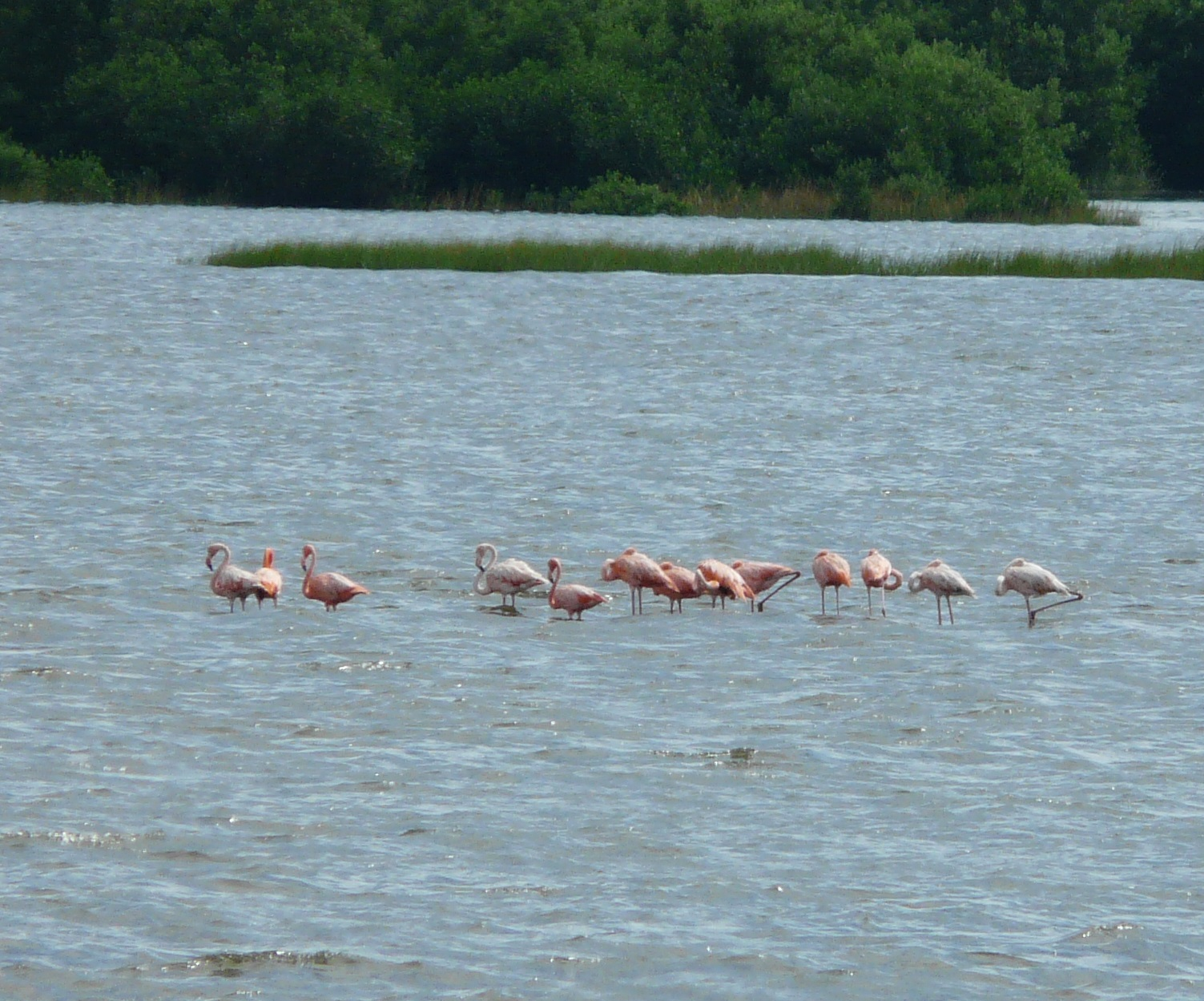
Vagrant American flamingoes at Cedar Key, Florida

A 2018 study confirmed the native status of flamingos in Florida and called for their federal protection as a threatened species, which had been debated by agencies during the prior decades. The study found that the growing flamingo sightings likely represent wild individuals and not escapes, and that at least some of these individuals are year-round residents in Florida. The status of flamingos as a former resident species was proven with the observations and breeding records by early naturalists, while the existence of modern resident populations was based on an abandoned young flamingo named Conchy found in Key West, who was radio-tagged and found to stay in Florida Bay year-round with other flamingos. The study also indicated that as flamingo populations around the Caribbean recover, more flamingos may join the resident populations and recolonize Florida, as has happened elsewhere in the Caribbean.

In 2023, Hurricane Idalia blew in large numbers of flamingos across the eastern United States, with records from Florida, Georgia, North Carolina, South Carolina, Virginia, Kentucky, Tennessee, as far north as Ohio and Pennsylvania, and as far northwest as Wisconsin. These vagrant populations likely originated from the Yucatán Peninsula, were caught in the storm while en route to Cuba, and carried until the storm's landfall in the United States, after which they dispersed.

== Description ==
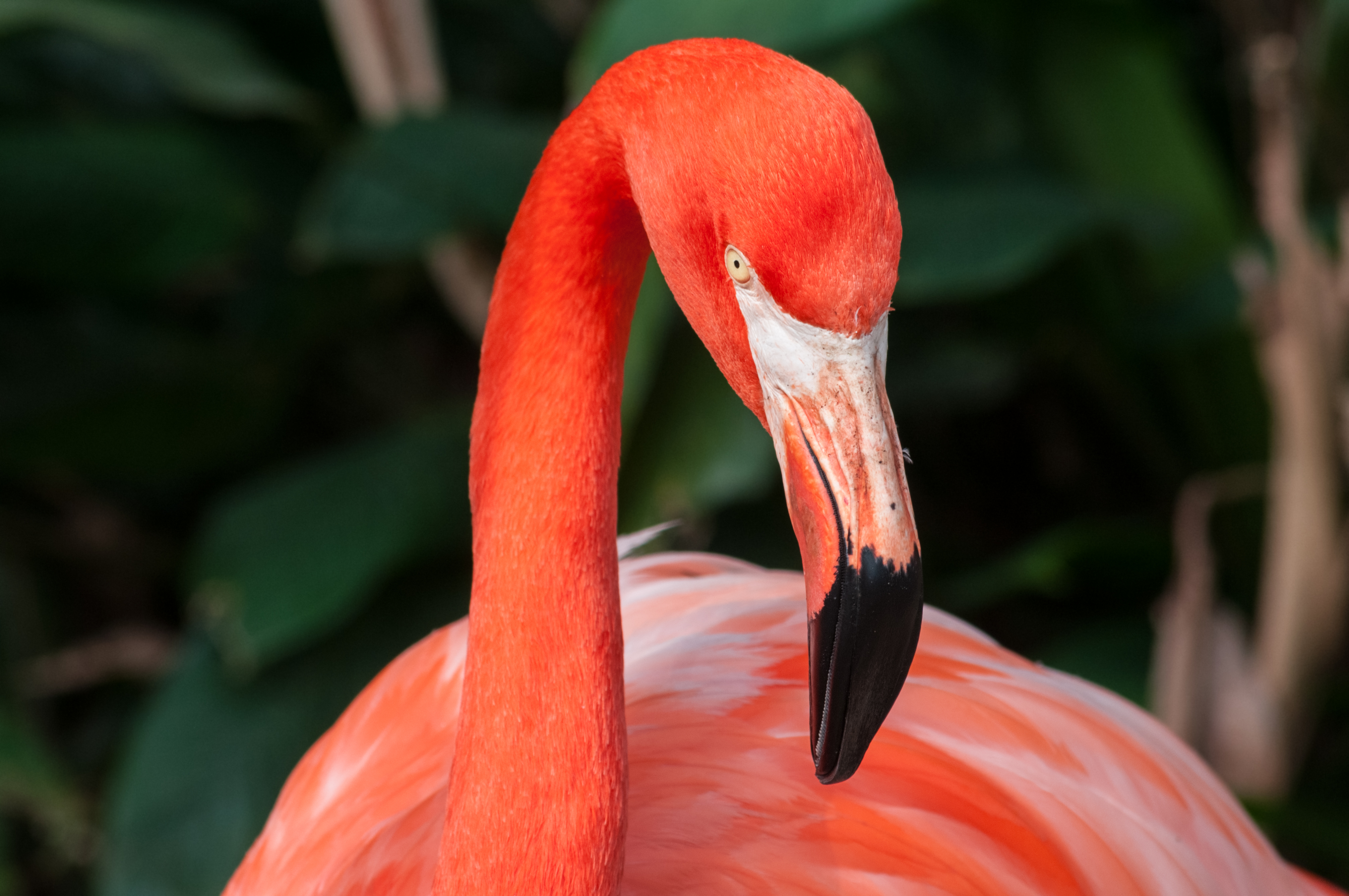
Close-up of head at São Paulo Zoo, Brazil

The American flamingo is a large wading bird with reddish-pink plumage. Like all flamingos, it lays a single chalky-white egg on a mud mound, between May and August; incubation until hatching takes from 28 to 32 days; both parents brood their young. They may reach sexual maturity between 3 and 6 years of age, though usually they do not reproduce until they are 6 years old. Their life expectancy of 40 years is one of the longest in birds.

Adult American flamingos are smaller on average than greater flamingos, but are the largest flamingos in the Americas. They measure from 120 to 145 cm (47 to 57 in) tall. The males weigh an average of 2.8 kg (6.2 lb), while females average 2.2 kg (4.9 lb). Most of its plumage is pink, giving rise to its earlier name of rosy flamingo and differentiating adults from the much paler greater flamingo. The wing coverts are red, and the primary and secondary flight feathers are black. The bill is pink and white with an extensive black tip. The legs are entirely pink. The call is a goose-like honking. It is one of the species to which the Agreement on the Conservation of African-Eurasian Migratory Waterbirds applies.

== Mating and bonding behaviors ==
Mating and bonding behaviors of P. ruber individuals have been extensively studied in captivity. The American flamingo is usually monogamous when selecting a nest site, and incubating and raising young; however, extra-pair copulations are frequent.

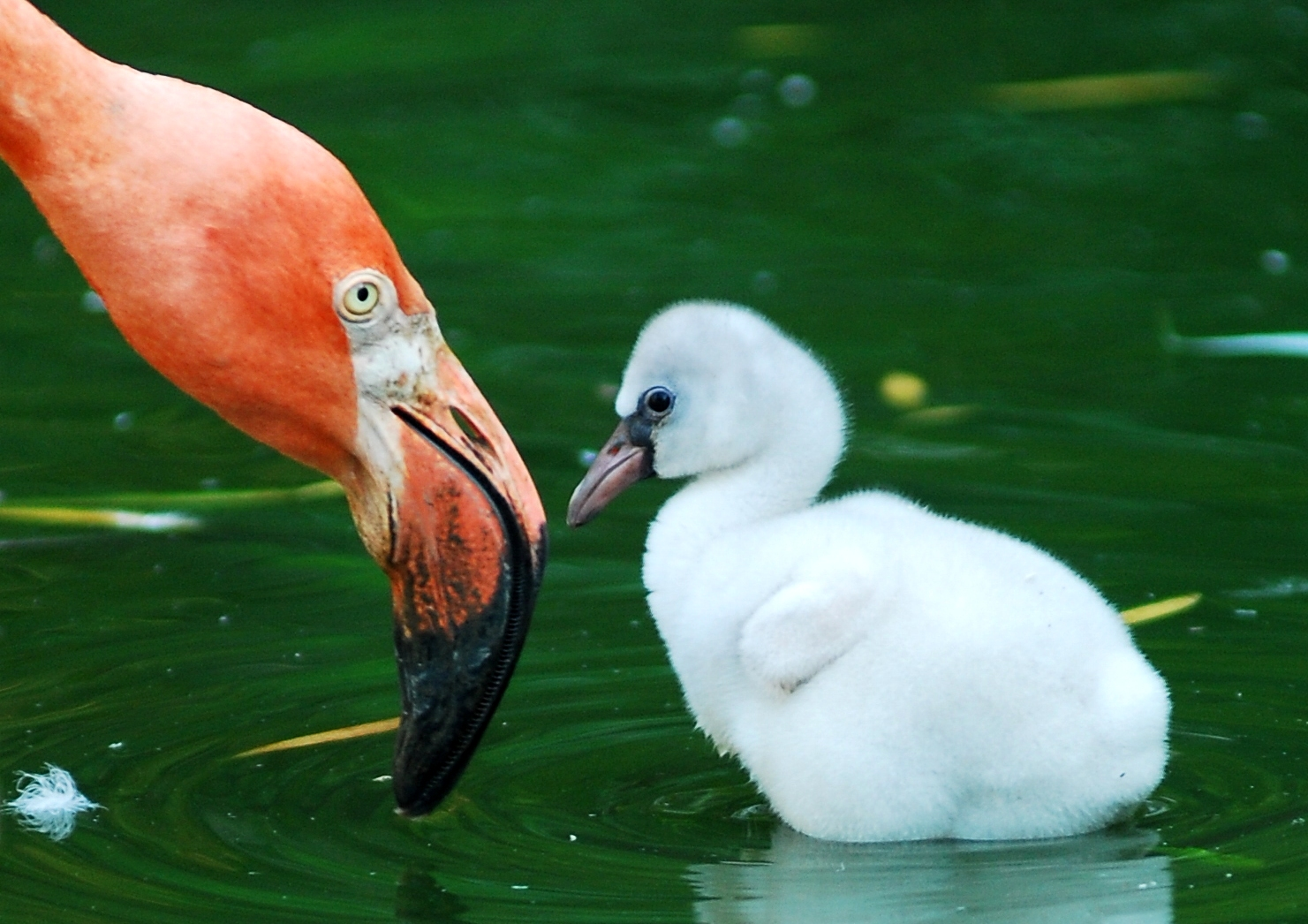
A chick and its mother

While males usually initiate courtship, females control the process. If interest is mutual, a female walks by the male, and if the male is receptive, he walks with her. Both parties make synchronized movements until one member aborts this process. For low-intensity courtships, males and females walk in unison with their heads raised. In high-intensity courtships, males and females walk at a quick pace with their heads dropped in a false feeding posture. This high-intensity courtship stops at any point if either bird turns and the other does not follow, the heads are raised, unison movements are stopped, or the pace of movement is slowed. If the female is ultimately receptive to copulation, she stops walking and presents for the male. Long-term pairs do not frequently engage in courtship behaviors or in-group display. Pairs often stand, sleep, and eat in close proximity.

Courtship is most often seen among individuals that change partners often or are promiscuous. A spectrum of pairing relationships is seen. Some birds have a long-term partner throughout the year; others form pairs during periods of courtship and nest attendance. How long a relationship lasts is affected by many factors, including addition and removal of adults, maturation of juveniles, and occurrence of trios and quartets. In most pairs, both individuals usually construct and defend the nest site. In rare cases, one individual undertakes both duties. Within trios, the dominant pair begins the nesting process by choosing and then defending the site.

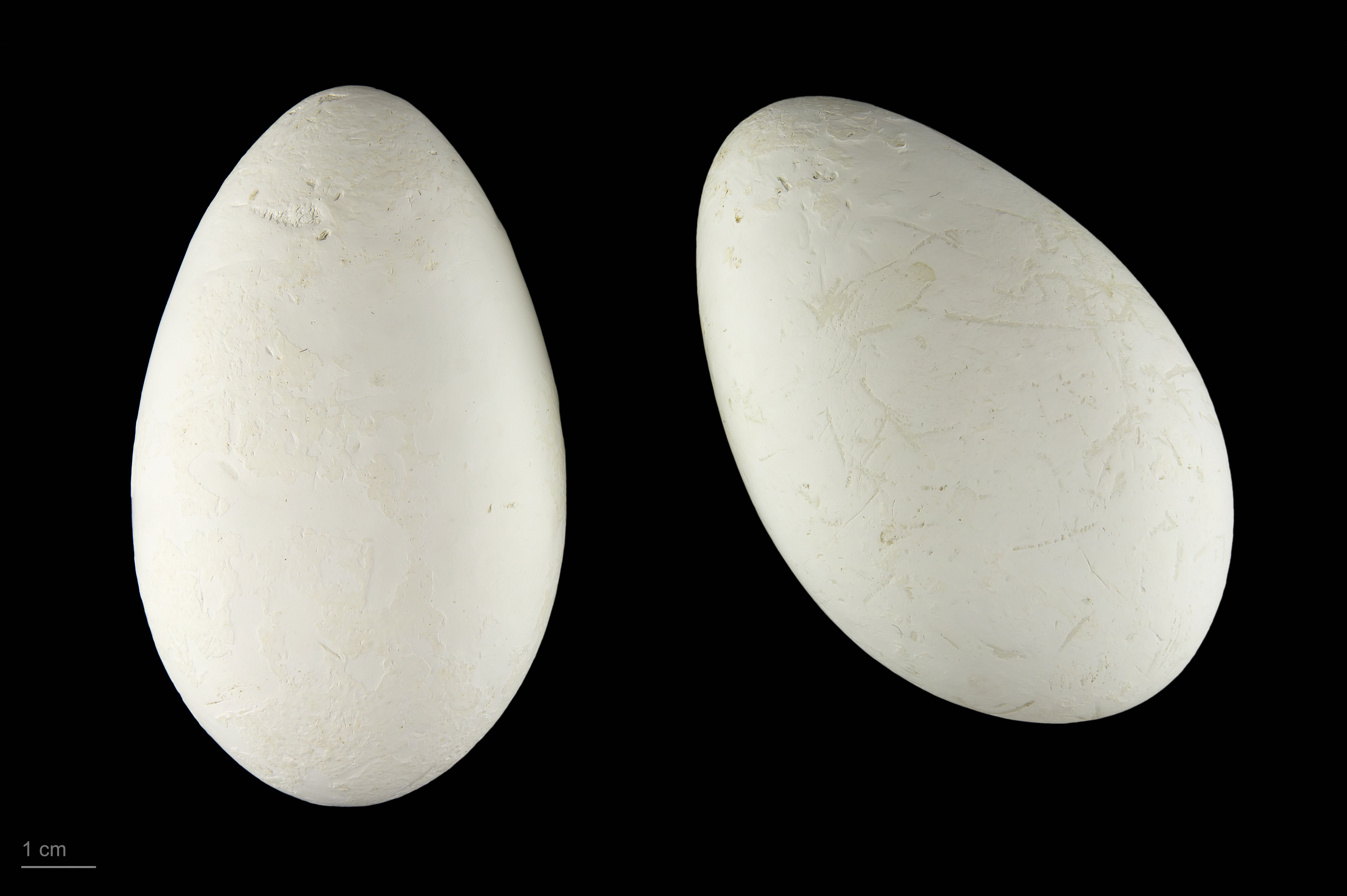
Phoenicopterus ruber - MHNT

For trios with one male and two females, the subordinate female is tolerated by the male, but often fights with the dominant female. If two females share a nest and both lay an egg, one female will try to destroy the other egg or roll it out of the nest. For trios with two males and one female, the subordinate male is tolerated by both individuals and often becomes the primary incubator and caregiver of the chicks. For quartets, the dominant male and two females take care of the nest, while the subordinate male remains around the periphery, never gaining access to the nest. Less animosity is observed between the dominant and subordinate females in quartets compared to trios. The egg is attended constantly and equally by alternating parents. Chicks at the nest are attended constantly by alternating parents, up to 7–11 days of age. Most attentive periods during incubation and brooding last 21–60 hours, both in the case where the 'off-duty' parents remain in the same lagoon to feed, or (when breeding occurs in lagoons deficient in food), they fly to other lagoons to feed. Nest reliefs during incubation take place predominantly in late afternoon, or early morning.

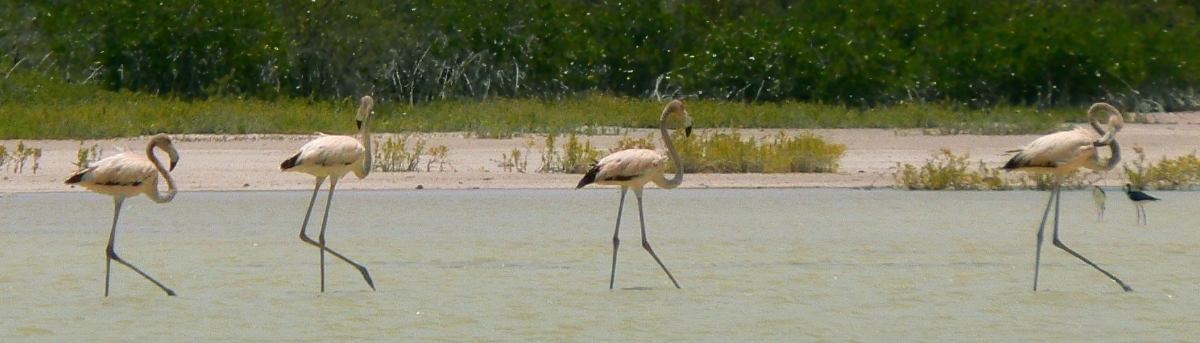
A group of immature birds at Lago de Oviedo, Dominican Republic

The time for receiving food from parents decreases from hatching to about 105 days, and the decrease is greatest after the chicks have left the nest at 7–11 days to band into crèches. The frequency and the duration of feeds by male and female partners do not differ significantly. After chicks have left the nest, feeds are predominantly nocturnal.

== Adaptations ==
The American flamingo has adapted to its shallow-water environment in several ways. It has evolved long legs and large webbed feet to wade and stir up the bottom of the water bed to bring up their food source to then be retrieved. To feed, it has evolved a specialized beak which is hooked downward and features marginal lamellae on the upper mandible, and inner and outer lamellae on both the upper and lower mandibles. These are adapted for filtering out differently sized food from water. Depending on the food source in their area, diets depend on the exact morphology of their beaks on what can and cannot be strained out of them. The American flamingo's diet consists of small crustaceans (Artemia, Gammarus, Dotilla, and copepods), molluscs (Cerithidea, Cerithium, Paludestrina, Neritina, Gemma, and Macoma), some worms (Nereis), nematodes, insects (water beetles or ants) and their larvae (Ephydra, Chironomus, Thinophilus, Sigaria, and Micronecta), small fish (Cyprinodon), widgeon grass, seeds (Ruppia, Scirpus, Juncus, and Cyperus), algae, diatoms, and decaying leaves. They are also known to consume mud from which they are able to get microorganisms and bacteria and obtain nutrients. It submerges its head under water to retrieve its food, and may have its head under water for long times, which requires it to hold its breath. Factors which affect the habitat choice of American flamingos are environmental temperatures, water depth, food source, accessibility of an area, and the presence of vegetation beds in feeding areas. If available food items do not meet the needs of the flamingos or the temperature is not appropriate to their requirements, they move to a better feeding or more temperate area.

== Osmoregulation ==
The role of osmoregulation—the maintenance of a precise balance of solute and water concentrations within the body—is performed by a number of bodily functions working together. In P. ruber, the kidney, the lower gastrointestinal tract, and the salt glands work together to maintain the homeostasis between ions and fluids. In mammals, the kidneys and urinary bladder are the primary organs used in osmoregulation. Birds, however, lack a urinary bladder and must compensate using these three organs.

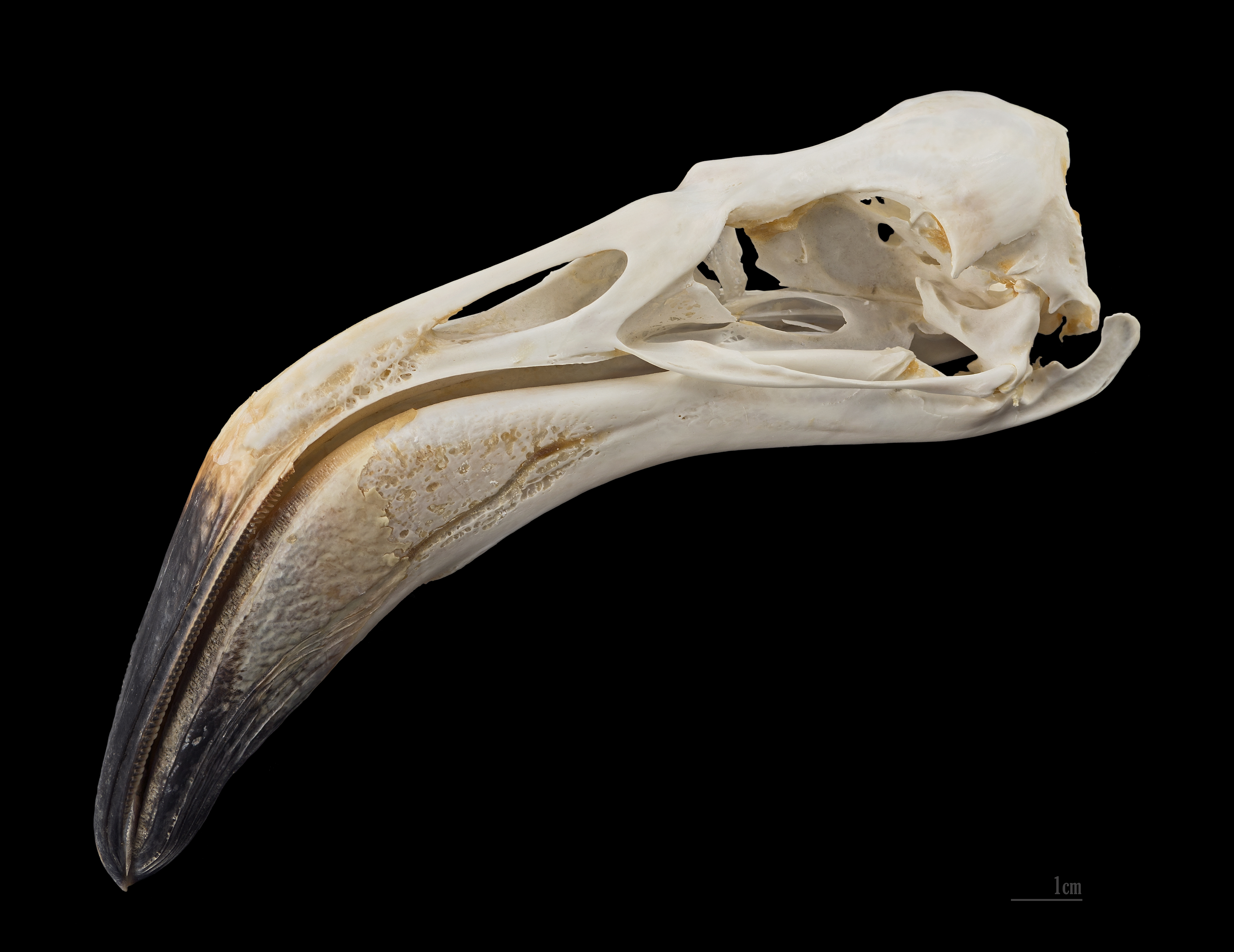
Skull MHNT

American flamingos are saltwater birds that ingest food with a high salt content and mostly drink salt water (with an osmolarity of usually 1000), hyperosmotic to the bodies cells . From their high-salt diet, they would lose more water and have a greater salt uptake. One way in which they osmoregulate is through the use of a salt gland, which is found in their beaks. This salt gland helps excrete excess salt from the body through the nasal openings in the flamingo's beaks. When these birds consume salt, the osmolarity increases in the blood plasma through the gut. This causes water to move out of the cells, increasing extracellular fluids. Both these changes, in turn, activate the salt glands of the bird, but before any activity occurs in the salt glands, the kidney has to reabsorb the ingested sodium from the small intestine. As seen in other saltwater birds, the fluid that is excreted has been seen to have an osmolarity greater than that of the salt water, but this varies with salt consumption and body size.

As food and saltwater are ingested, sodium and water absorption begins through the walls of the gut and into the extracellular fluid. Sodium is then circulated to the kidney, where the plasma undergoes filtration by the renal glomerulus. Although birds' kidneys tend to be larger in size, they are inefficient in producing concentrated urine that is significantly hyperosmotic to their blood plasma. This form of secretion would cause dehydration from water loss. Therefore, sodium and water are reabsorbed into the plasma by renal tubules. This increase in osmotic plasma levels causes extracellular fluid volume to increase, which triggers receptors in both the brain and heart. These receptors then stimulate salt gland secretion and sodium is able to efficiently leave the body through the nares while maintaining a high body water level.

Flamingos, like many other marine birds, have a high saline intake, yet even the glomular filtration rate (GFR) remains unchanged. This is because of the salt glands; high concentrations of sodium are present in the renal filtrate, but can be reabsorbed almost completely where it is excreted in high concentrations in the salt glands. Renal reabsorption can be increased through the output of the antidiuretic hormone called arginine vasotocin (AVT). AVT opens protein channels in the collection ducts of the kidney called aquaporins. Aquaporins increase the membrane permeability to water, as well as causes less water to move from the blood and into the kidney tubules.

=== Specialized osmoregulatory cells and transport mechanisms ===
The salt gland used by the American flamingo has two segments, a medial and lateral segment. These segments are tube shaped glands that consist of two cell types. The first is the cuboidal – peripheral cells which are small, triangular shaped cells which have only a few mitochondria. The second specialized cells are the principal cells which are found down the length of the secretory tubules, and are rich in mitochondria. These cells are similar to the mitochondria rich cells found in teleost fish.

These cells within the salt gland employ several types of transport mechanisms that respond to osmoregulatory loads. Sodium-Potassium ATPase works with a Sodium-Chloride cotransporter (also known as the NKCC), and a basal potassium channel to secrete salt (NaCl) into secretory tubes. The ATPase uses energy from ATP to pump three sodium ions out of the cell and two potassium ions into the cell. The potassium channel allows potassium ions to diffuse out of the cell. The cotransporter pumps one sodium, potassium and two chloride ions into the cell. The chloride ion diffuses through the apical membrane into the secretory tube and the sodium follows via a paracellular route. This is what forms the hyperosmotic solution within the salt glands.

== Circulatory system ==
Although there has been little investigation on the specific circulatory and cardiovascular system of the phoenicopteridae, they possess the typical features of an avian circulatory system. As is seen in other aves, the flamingo's circulatory system is closed maintaining a separation of oxygenated and deoxygenated blood. This maximizes their efficiency to meet their high metabolic needs during flight. Due to this need for increased cardiac output, the avian heart tends to be larger in relation to body mass than what is seen in most mammals.

=== Heart type and features ===
The avian circulatory system is driven by a four-chambered, myogenic heart contained in a fibrous pericardial sac. This pericardial sac is filled with a serous fluid for lubrication. The heart itself is divided into a right and left half, each with an atrium and ventricle. The atrium and ventricles of each side are separated by atrioventricular valves which prevent back flow from one chamber to the next during contraction. Being myogenic, the hearts pace is maintained by pacemaker cells found in the sinoatrial node, located on the right atrium. The sinoatrial node uses calcium to cause a depolarizing signal transduction pathway from the atrium through right and left atrioventricular bundle which communicates contraction to the ventricles. The avian heart also consists of muscular arches that are made up of thick bundles of muscular layers. Much like a mammalian heart, the avian heart is composed of endocardial, myocardial and epicardial layers. The atrium walls tend to be thinner than the ventricle walls, due to the intense ventricular contraction used to pump oxygenated blood throughout the body.

=== Organization of circulatory system ===
Similar to the atrium, the arteries are composed of thick elastic muscles to withstand the pressure of the ventricular constriction, and become more rigid as they move away from the heart. Blood moves through the arteries, which undergo vasoconstriction, and into arterioles which act as a transportation system to distribute primarily oxygen as well as nutrients to all tissues of the body. As the arterioles move away from the heart and into individual organs and tissues they are further divided to increase surface area and slow blood flow. Travelling through the arterioles blood moves into the capillaries where gas exchange can occur. Capillaries are organized into capillary beds in tissues, it is here that blood exchanges oxygen for carbon dioxide waste. In the capillary beds blood flow is slowed to allow maximum diffusion of oxygen into the tissues. Once the blood has become deoxygenated it travels through venules then veins and back to the heart. Veins, unlike arteries, are thin and rigid as they do not need to withstand extreme pressure. As blood travels through the venules to the veins a funneling occurs called vasodilation bringing blood back to the heart. Once the blood reaches the heart it moves first into the right atrium, then the left ventricle to be pumped through the lungs for further gas exchange of carbon dioxide waste for oxygen. Oxygenated blood then flows from the lungs through the left atrium to the left ventricle where it is pumped out to the body. With respect to thermoregulation, the American flamingo has highly vascularized feet that use a countercurrent exchange system in their legs and feet. This method of thermoregulation keeps a constant gradient between the veins and arteries that are in close proximity in order to maintain heat within the core and minimize heat loss or gain in the extremities. Heat loss is minimized while wading in cold water, while heat gain is minimized in the hot temperatures during rest and flight.

=== Physical and chemical properties of pumping blood ===
Avian hearts are generally larger than mammalian hearts when compared to body mass. This adaptation allows more blood to be pumped to meet the high metabolic need associated with flight. Birds, like the flamingo, have a very efficient system for diffusing oxygen into the blood; birds have a ten times greater surface area to gas exchange volume than mammals. As a result, birds have more blood in their capillaries per unit of volume of lung than a mammal. The American flamingo's four-chambered heart is myogenic, meaning that all the muscle cells and fibers have the ability to contract rhythmically. The rhythm of contraction is controlled by the pace maker cells which have a lower threshold for depolarization. The wave of electrical depolarization initiated here is what physically starts the heart's contractions and begins pumping blood. Pumping blood creates variations in blood pressure and as a result, creates different thicknesses of blood vessels. The Law of LaPlace can be used to explain why arteries are relatively thick and veins are thin.

=== Blood composition ===
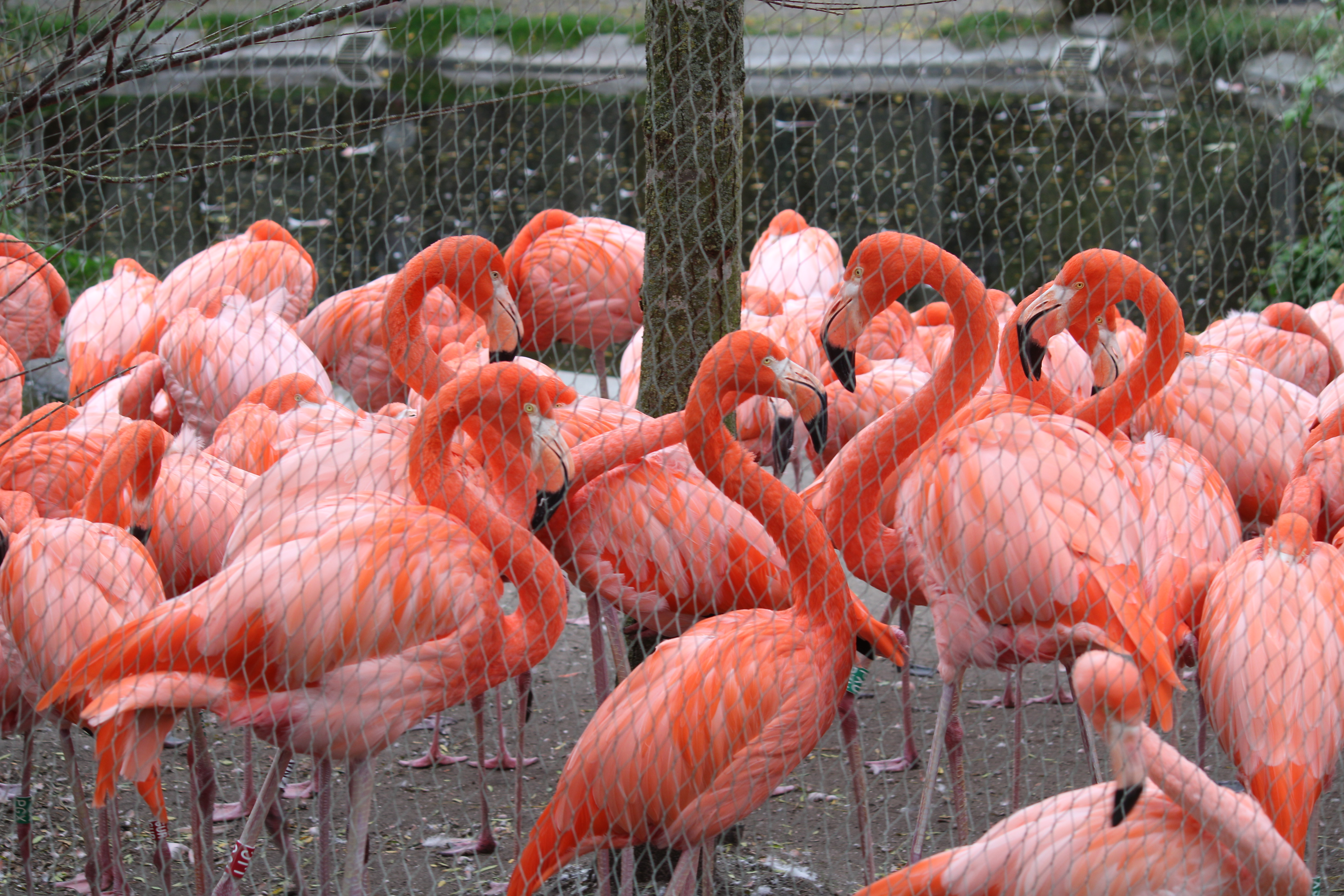
At Copenhagen Zoo: captive flamingoes have been shown to have more red blood cells than wild ones

It was widely thought that avian blood had special properties which attributed to a very efficient extraction and transportation of oxygen in comparison to mammalian blood. This is not true; there is no real difference in the efficiency of the blood, and both mammals and birds use a hemoglobin molecule as the primary oxygen carrier with little to no difference in oxygen carrying capacity. Captivity and age have been seen to have an effect on the blood composition of the American flamingo. A decrease in white blood cell numbers was predominate with age in both captive and free living flamingos, but captive flamingos showed a higher white blood cell count than free living flamingos. One exception occurs in free living flamingos with regards to white blood cell count. The number of eosinophils in free living birds are higher because these cells are the ones that fight off parasites with which a free living bird may have more contact than a captive one. Captive birds showed higher hematocrit and red blood cell numbers than the free living flamingos, and a blood hemoglobin increase was seen with age. An increase in hemoglobin would correspond with an adults increase in metabolic needs. A smaller mean cellular volume recorded in free living flamingos coupled with similar mean hemoglobin content between captive and free living flamingos could show different oxygen diffusion characteristics between these two groups. Plasma chemistry remains relatively stable with age but lower values of protein content, uric acid, cholesterol, triglycerides, and phospholipids were seen in free living flamingos. This trend can be attributed to shortages and variances in food intake in free living flamingos.

=== Blood composition and osmoregulation ===
Avian erythrocytes (red blood cells) have been shown to contain approximately ten times the amount of taurine (an amino acid) as mammal erythrocytes. Taurine has a fairly large list of physiological functions; but in birds, it can have an important influence on osmoregulation. It helps the movement of ions in erythrocytes by altering the permeability of the membrane and regulating osmotic pressure within the cell. The regulation of osmotic pressure is achieved by the influx or efflux of taurine relative to changes in the osmolarity of the blood. In a hypotonic environment, cells will swell and eventually shrink; this shrinkage is due to efflux of taurine. This process also works in the opposite way in hypertonic environments. In hypertonic environments cells tend to shrink and then enlarge; this enlargement is due to an influx in taurine, effectively changing the osmotic pressure. This adaptation allows the flamingo to regulate between differences in salinity.

== Respiratory system ==
Relatively few studies have focused on the flamingo respiratory system, however little to no divergences from the standard avian anatomical design have occurred in their evolutionary history. Nevertheless, some physiological differences do occur in the flamingo and structurally similar species.

The respiratory system is not only important for efficient gas exchange, but for thermoregulation and vocalization. Thermoregulation is important for flamingos as they generally live in warm habitats and their plush plumage increases body temperature. Heat loss is accomplished through thermal polypnea (panting), that is an increase in respiratory rate. It has been seen that the medulla, hypothalamus and mid-brain are involved in the control of panting, as well through the Hering-Breuer reflex that uses stretch receptors in the lungs, and the vagus nerve. This effect of the panting is accelerated by a process called gular fluttering; rapid flapping of membranes in the throat which is synchronized with the movements of the thorax. Both of these mechanisms promote evaporative heat loss, which allows for the bird to push out warm air and water from the body. Increases in respiratory rate would normally cause respiratory alkalosis because carbon dioxide levels are rapidly dropping in the body, but the flamingo is able to bypass this, most likely through a shunt mechanism, which allow it to still maintain a sustainable partial pressure of carbon dioxide in the blood. Since the avian integument is not equipped with sweat glands, cutaneous cooling is minimal. Because the flamingo's respiratory system is shared with multiple functions, panting must be controlled to prevent hypoxia.

Animals with long necks must, by design, exhibit tracheal elongation; to connect the lungs to the nostrils or glottis, the trachea must at least be equally long with the neck; the trachea is an important area of the respiratory tract; aside from directing air in and out of the lungs, it has the largest volume of dead space in the entire tract, which is the portion of inhaled air which does not get utilized for gas exchange (not used for respiration). In avians, the dead space is around 4.5 times higher than in mammals of roughly the same body size. In particular, flamingos have a trachea that, if outstretched, is longer than its entire body length with 330 cartilaginous rings. As a result, they have a calculated dead space twice as high as another bird of the same size. To compensate for the elongation, they usually breathe in deep, slow patterns.

One hypothesis for the bird's adaptation to respiratory alkalosis is tracheal coiling, which is an overly long extension of the trachea that often wraps other parts of the bird's anatomy. When faced with a heat load, birds often use thermal panting and this adaptation of tracheal coiling allows ventilation of non-gas exchange surfaces which can enable the bird to avoid respiratory alkalosis. The flamingo uses a "flushout" pattern of ventilation where deeper breaths are essentially mixed in with shallow panting to flush out carbon dioxide and avoid alkalosis. The increased length of the trachea provides a greater ability for respiratory evaporation and cooling off without hyperventilation.

== Thermoregulation ==
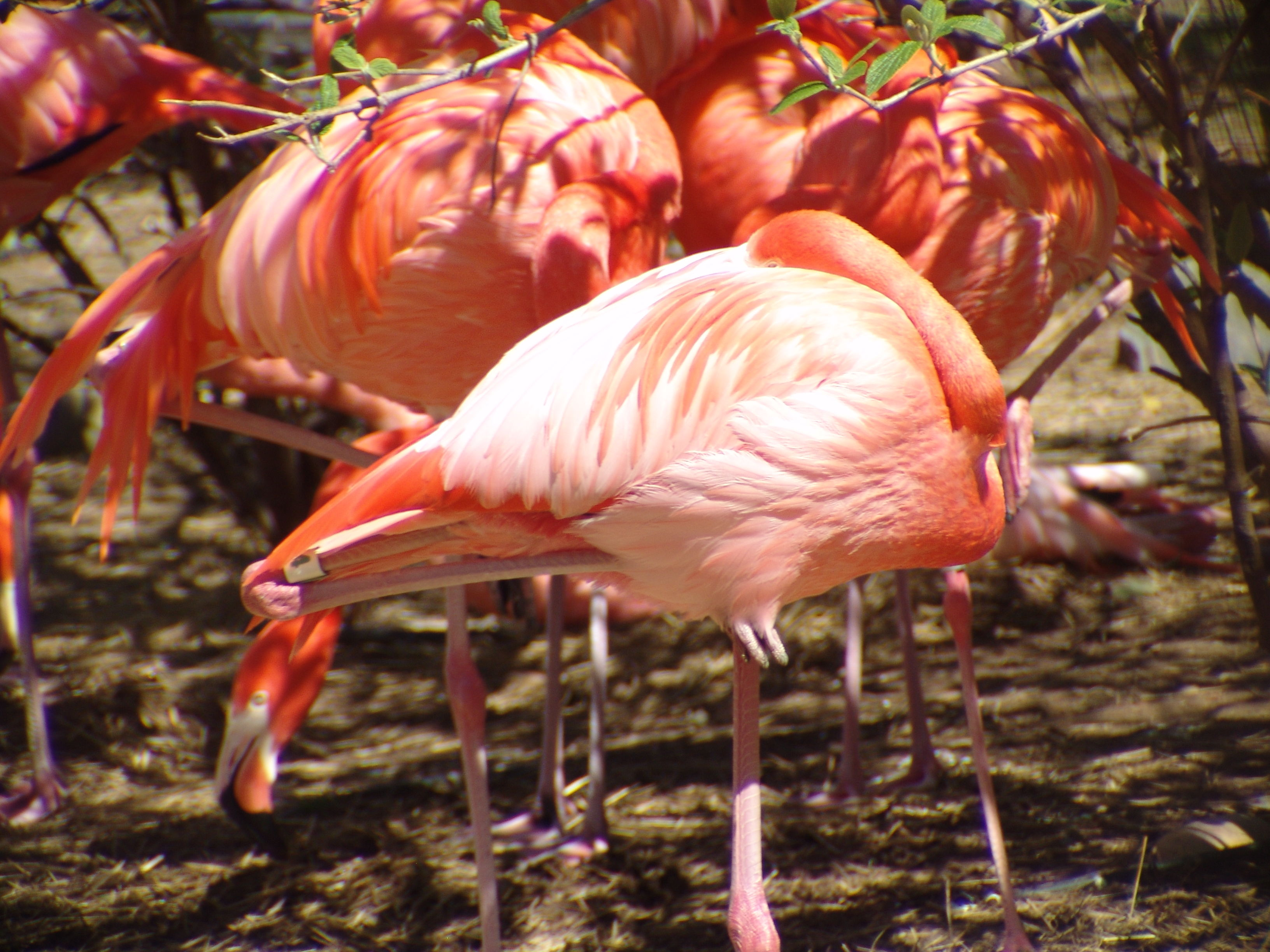
P. ruber stands on one leg in order to retain body heat

Thermoregulation is a matter of keeping a consistent body temperature regardless of the surrounding ambient temperature. Flamingos require both methods of efficient heat retention and release. Even though the American flamingo resides mainly close to the equator where there is relatively little fluctuation in temperature, seasonal and circadian variations in temperature must be accounted for.

Like all animals, flamingos maintain a relatively constant basal metabolic rate (BMR); the metabolic rate of an animal in its thermoneutral zone (TNZ) while at rest. The BMR is a static rate which changes depending on factors such as the time of day or seasonal activity. Like most other birds, basic physiological adaptations control both heat loss in warm conditions and heat retention in cooler conditions. Using a system of countercurrent blood flow, heat is efficiently recycled through the body rather than being lost through extremities such as the legs and feet.

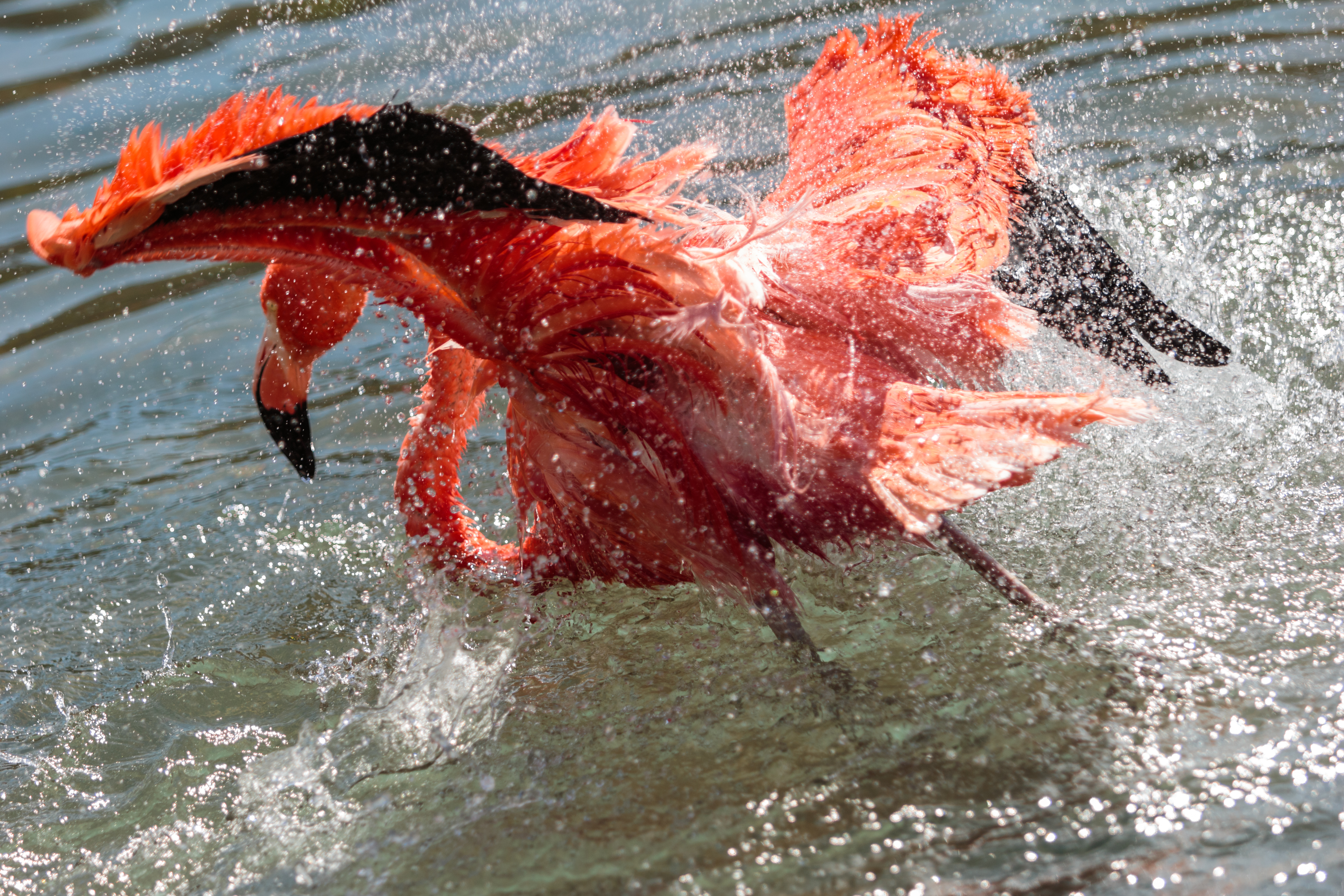
Individual at SeaWorld San Diego cleaning its feathers

Living in the equatorial region of the world, the American flamingo has little variation in seasonal temperature changes. However, as a homeothermic endotherm it is still faced with the challenge of maintaining a constant body temperature while being exposed to both the day (light period) and night (dark period) temperatures of its environments. Phoenicopterus ruber have evolved a number of thermoregulatory mechanisms to keep itself cool during the light period and warm during the dark period without expending too much energy. The American flamingo has been observed in a temperature niche between 17.8–35.2 °C (64.0–95.4 °F). In order to prevent water loss through evaporation when temperatures are elevated the flamingo will employ hyperthermia as a nonevaporative heat loss method keeping its body temperature between 40–42 °C (104–108 °F). This allows heat to leave the body by moving from an area of high body temperature to an area of a lower ambient temperature. Flamingos are also able to use evaporative heat loss methods such as, cutaneous evaporative heat loss and respiratory evaporative heat loss. During cutaneous heat loss, Phoenicopterus ruber relies on evaporation off of the skin to reduce its body temperature. This method is not very efficient as it requires evaporation to pass through the plumage. A more efficient way to reduce its body temperature is through respiratory evaporative heat loss, where the flamingo engages in panting to expel excessive body heat. During the dark period the flamingos tend to tuck their heads beneath their wing to conserve body heat. They may also elicit shivering as a means of muscular energy consumption to produce heat as needed.

One of the most distinctive attribute of P. ruber is its unipedal stance, or the tendency to stand on one leg. While the purpose of this iconic posture remains ultimately unanswered, strong evidence supports its function in regulating body temperature. Like most birds, the largest amount of heat is lost through the legs and feet; having long legs can be a major disadvantage when temperatures fall and heat retention is most important. By holding one leg up against the ventral surface of the body, the flamingo lowers the surface area by which heat exits the body. Moreover, it has been observed that during periods of increased temperatures such as mid-day, flamingos will stand on both legs. Holding a bipedal stance multiplies the amount of heat lost from the legs and further regulates body temperature.

== Migration ==
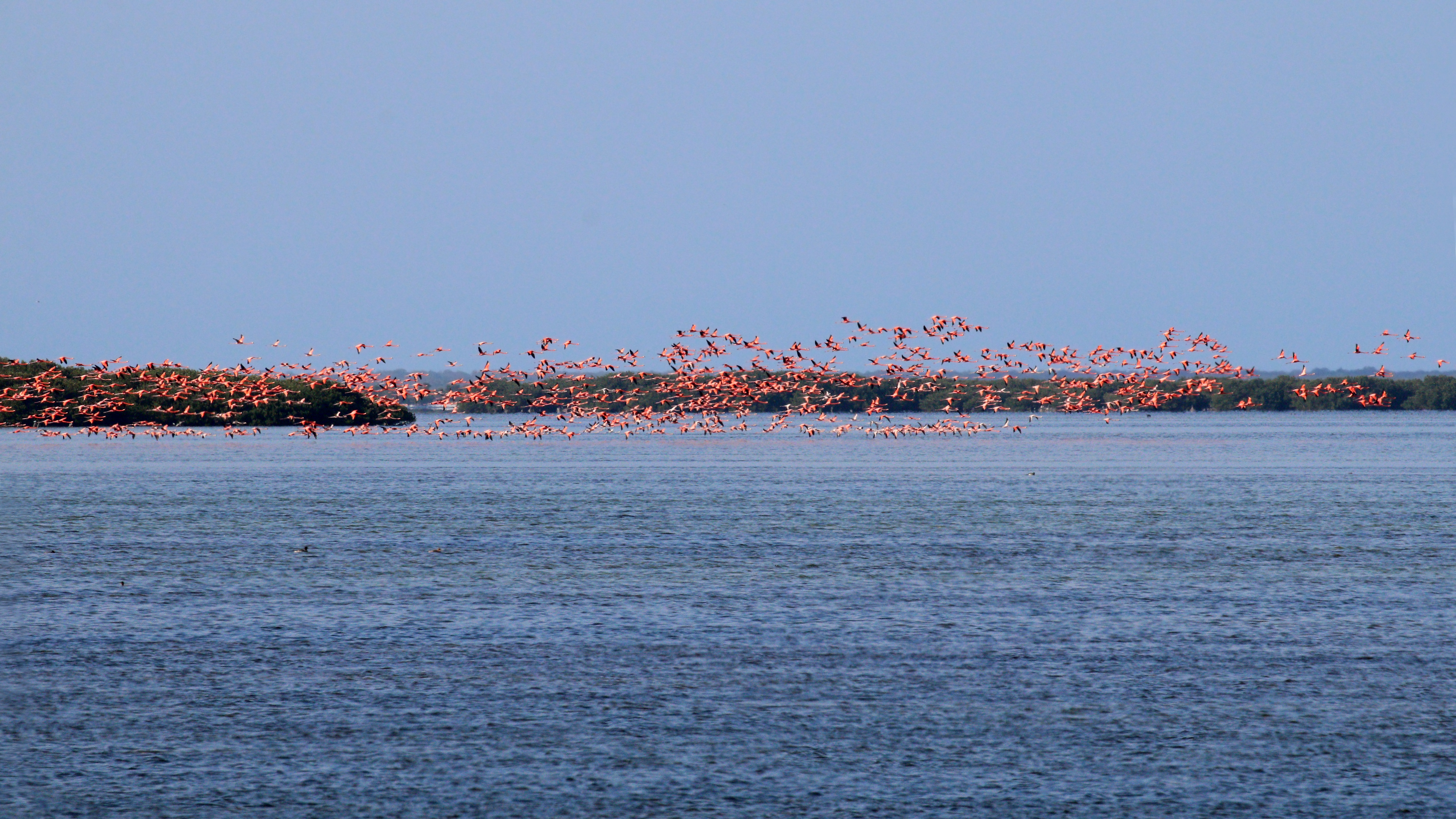
The flock flight at Cayo Coco, Cuba

Like other flamingo species, American flamingos will migrate short distances to ensure that they get enough food or because their current habitat has been disturbed in some way. One habitat disturbance that has been observed to cause flamingos to leave their feeding grounds is elevated water levels. These conditions make it difficult for Phoenicopterus ruber to wade, hindering their ability to access food. The flamingos will then abandon their feeding grounds in search of an alternate food source. While the flights are not as long as other migratory birds, flamingos still fly for periods without eating.
