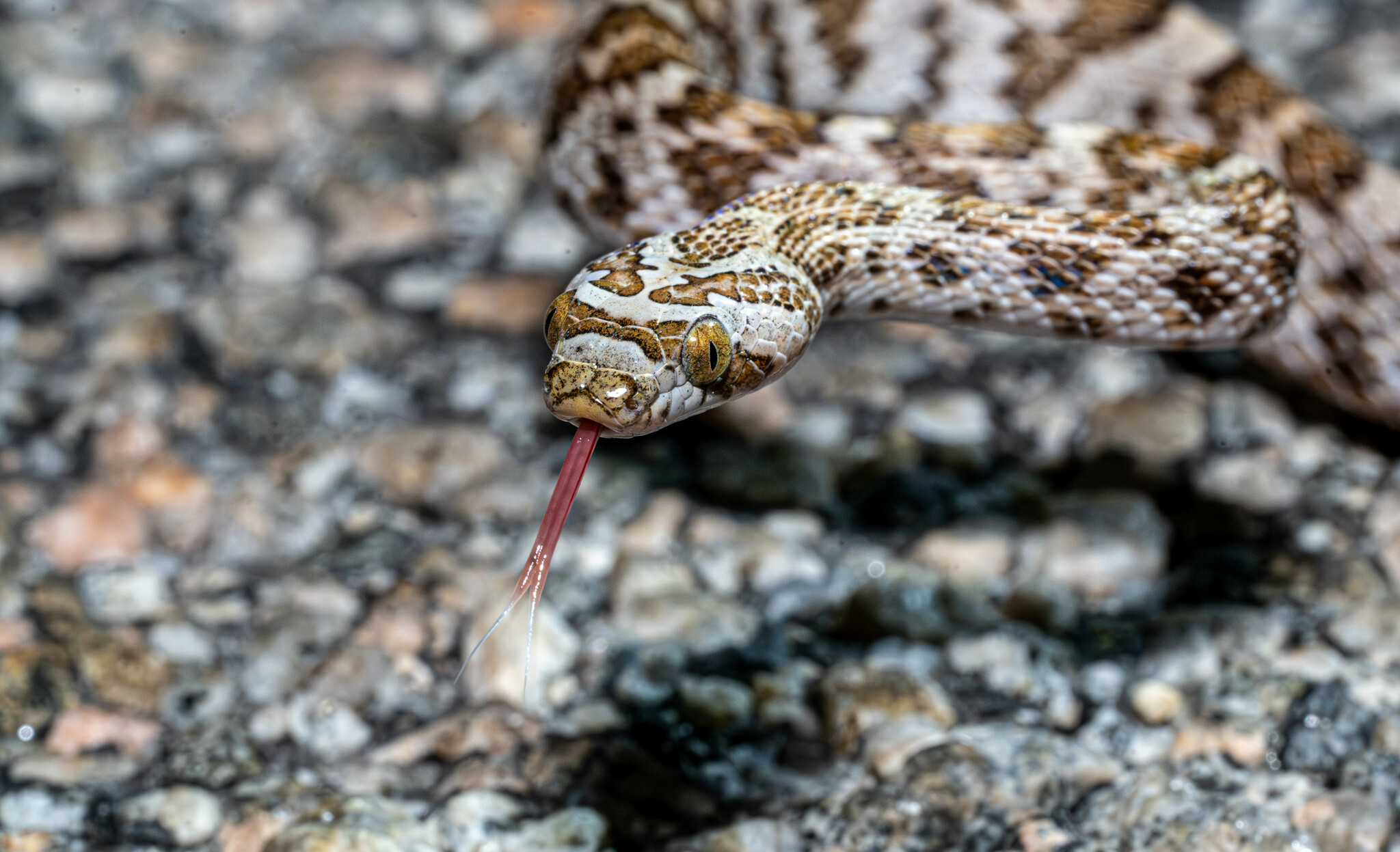

Conservation status
- Least Concern (IUCN 3.1)

Scientific classification
- Kingdom: Animalia
- Phylum: Chordata
- Class: Reptilia
- Order: Squamata
- Suborder: Serpentes
- Family: Colubridae
- Genus: Trimorphodon
- Species: T. lyrophanes

Binomial name
- Trimorphodon lyrophanes (Cope, 1860)

= Trimorphodon lyrophanes =

Baja California lyre snake

Trimorphodon lyrophanes, the Baja California lyre snake, is a species of snake of the family Colubridae.

The snake is found in the United States and Mexico.
