= Trimorphodon tau =

Conservation status
- Least Concern (IUCN 3.1)

Scientific classification
- Kingdom: Animalia
- Phylum: Chordata
- Class: Reptilia
- Order: Squamata
- Suborder: Serpentes
- Family: Colubridae
- Genus: Trimorphodon
- Species: T. tau

Binomial name
- Trimorphodon tau Cope, 1870

Species of snake

Trimorphodon tau, the Mexican lyre snake, is a species of snake of the family Colubridae. The snake is found in Mexico.

== Etymology ==
The epithet tau comes from the inverted T shape upon the top of its head and was described by Cope in 1870.

== Distribution and habitat ==
T. tau is found on the coastal side of the Sierra Madre Occidental, as well as in the Sierra Madre Occidental, Sierra Madre Del Sur, Mexican Plateau and Mesa de Oaxaca.

The Mexican lyre snake's preferred habitats include semi-arid to seasonally dry habitats. They can be found in vegetation or rocky locations within these environments.

== Description ==
The Mexican lyre snake is a nocturnal, medium size snake with maximum lengths of up to 1m from snout to tail. It has light brown markings with darker brown saddle like markings on its back. This species, like other Lyre snakes, has a diet consisting primarily of lizards.

== Subspecies ==
Trimophodon tau has two subspecies described, T. tau tau and T. tau latifascia. T. t. latifascia is only found in Puebla, Mexico. latifascia can be distinguished from T. t. tau through its dark grey head cap and dark snout along with lacking prefrontal and interocular bars compared to T. t. tau's pale to grey head cap and light snout with their complete interocular bar.
