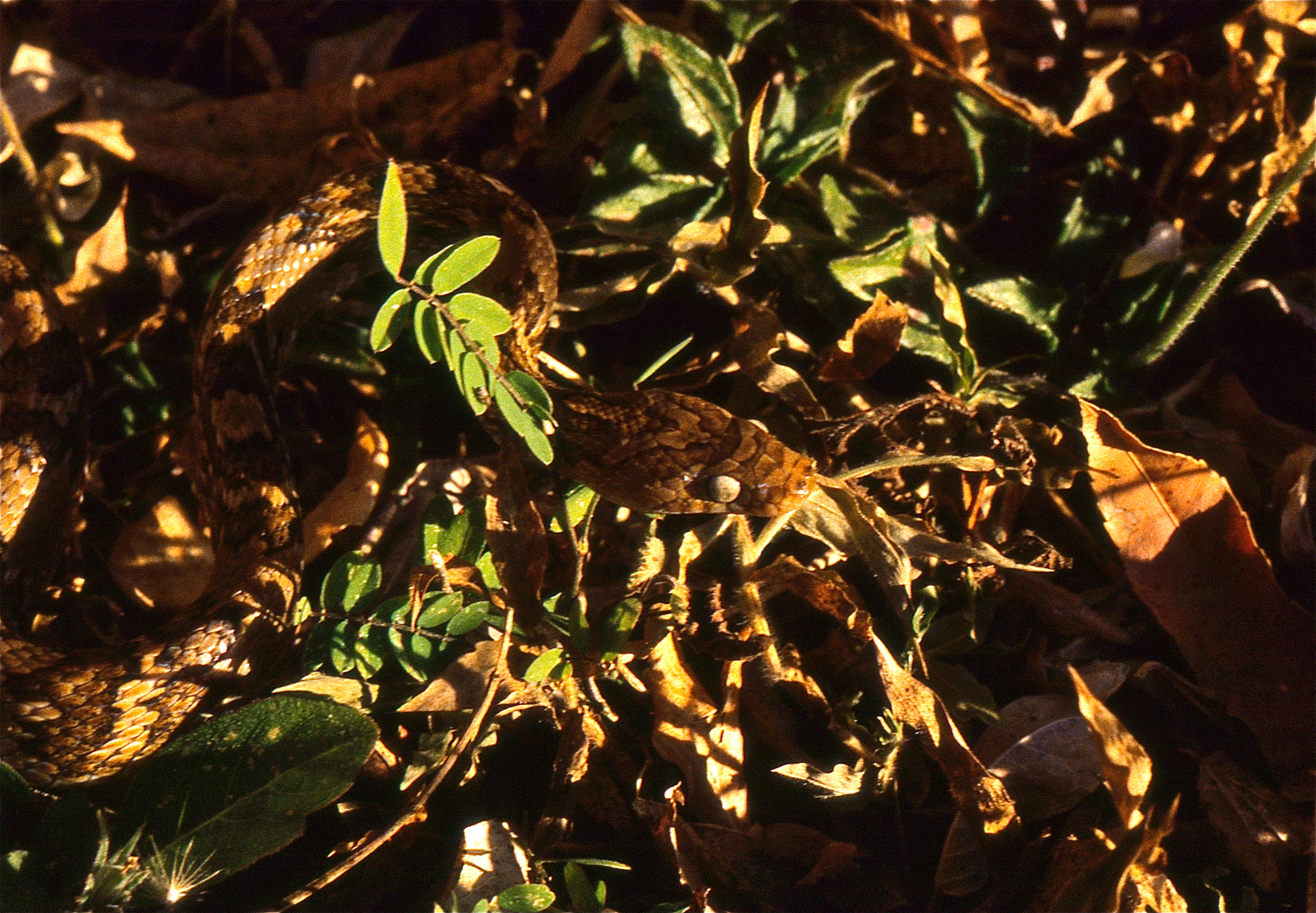

Conservation status
- Least Concern (IUCN 3.1)

Scientific classification
- Kingdom: Animalia
- Phylum: Chordata
- Class: Reptilia
- Order: Squamata
- Suborder: Serpentes
- Family: Colubridae
- Genus: Trimorphodon
- Species: T. quadruplex

Binomial name
- Trimorphodon quadruplex (Smith, 1941)

= Trimorphodon quadruplex =

Species of snake

Trimorphodon quadruplex, the Central American lyre snake, is a species of snake of the family Colubridae.

The snake is found in Nicaragua, Honduras, El Salvador. and Costa Rica.
