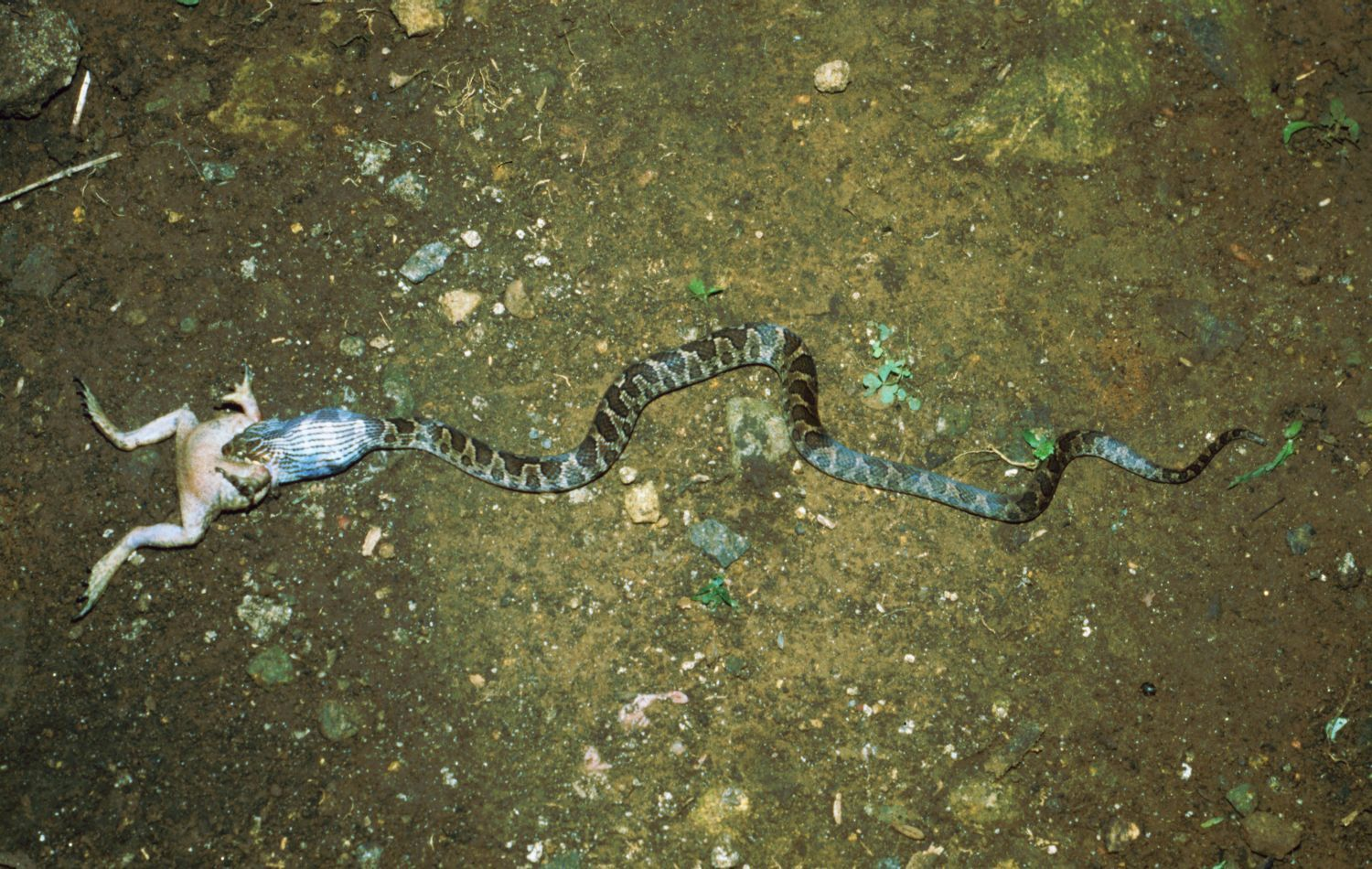

Conservation status
- Least Concern (IUCN 3.1)

Scientific classification
- Kingdom: Animalia
- Phylum: Chordata
- Class: Reptilia
- Order: Squamata
- Suborder: Serpentes
- Family: Colubridae
- Genus: Trimorphodon
- Species: T. biscutatus

Binomial name
- Trimorphodon biscutatus (Duméril, Bibron & Duméril, 1854)

= Trimorphodon biscutatus =

Species of snake

The western lyre snake (Trimorphodon biscutatus) is a mildly venomous colubrid snake native to Mexico and Guatemala.

== Description ==
They are a moderately sized snake, attaining lengths of approximately 1 meter at adult size. They are generally a brown, tan or grey in color with dark brown blotching down the back. They have large eyes with vertical pupils.

== Behavior ==
They are nocturnal and secretive, spending most of their time in rock crevices, and other areas difficult for potential predators to access. Their diet consists of lizards, small rodents, frogs, and bats. Their venom is not considered to be harmful to humans.
