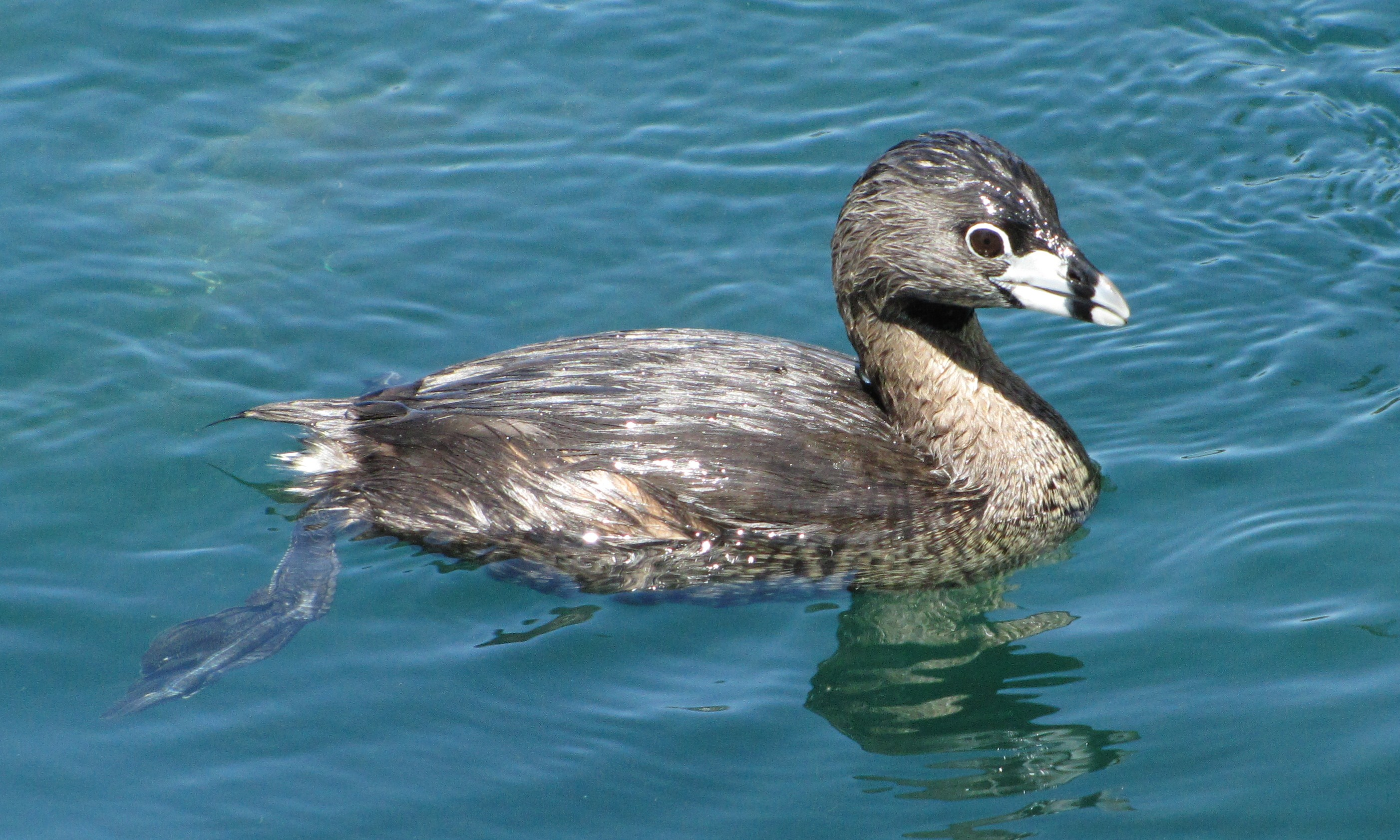
- Pied-billed grebe (Podilymbus podiceps) adult with breeding plumage

Scientific classification
- Domain: Eukaryota
- Kingdom: Animalia
- Phylum: Chordata
- Class: Aves
- Clade: Mirandornithes
- Order: Podicipediformes
- Family: Podicipedidae
- Tribe: Podilymbini; Storer, 1963

Genera
- Podilymbus; Poliocephalus?; Rollandia?; Tachybaptus; Thiornis?

= Podilymbini =

Podilymbins Temporal range: Early Miocene-Holocene, 23.03–0 Ma

Tribe of birds

Podilymbini is a potential tribe of waterbirds belonging to the family Podicipedidae containing the genera Podilymbus and Tachybaptus. In comparison to Podicipedini, podilymbins are characterized by the lack of nuptial plumes and the chicks have rufous down in one or more patches on the crown. They are able to stand upright and move around land more so. The mating displays among these birds are simpler.

There is uncertainty for the tribe, however, due to different morphological studies suggesting different interpretations of the tribe. Bochenski (1994) using comparative osteology studies found Podilymbini to also include the genera Poliocephalus and Rollandia. In his paper he found Podilymbus to be basal most of tribe while Tachybaptus is paraphyletic to Rollandia. Fjeldså (2004) using a more comprehensive ecomorphological dataset found support of just Podilymbus and Tachybaptus as traditionally stated by Storer (1963). Ksepka et al. (2013) also conducted a morphological analysis and found Podilymbus to be the sister genus Rollandia. Both genera were found to be closer to Aechmophorus and Podiceps, while Poliocephalus and Thiornis to be closer to Tachybaptus.
