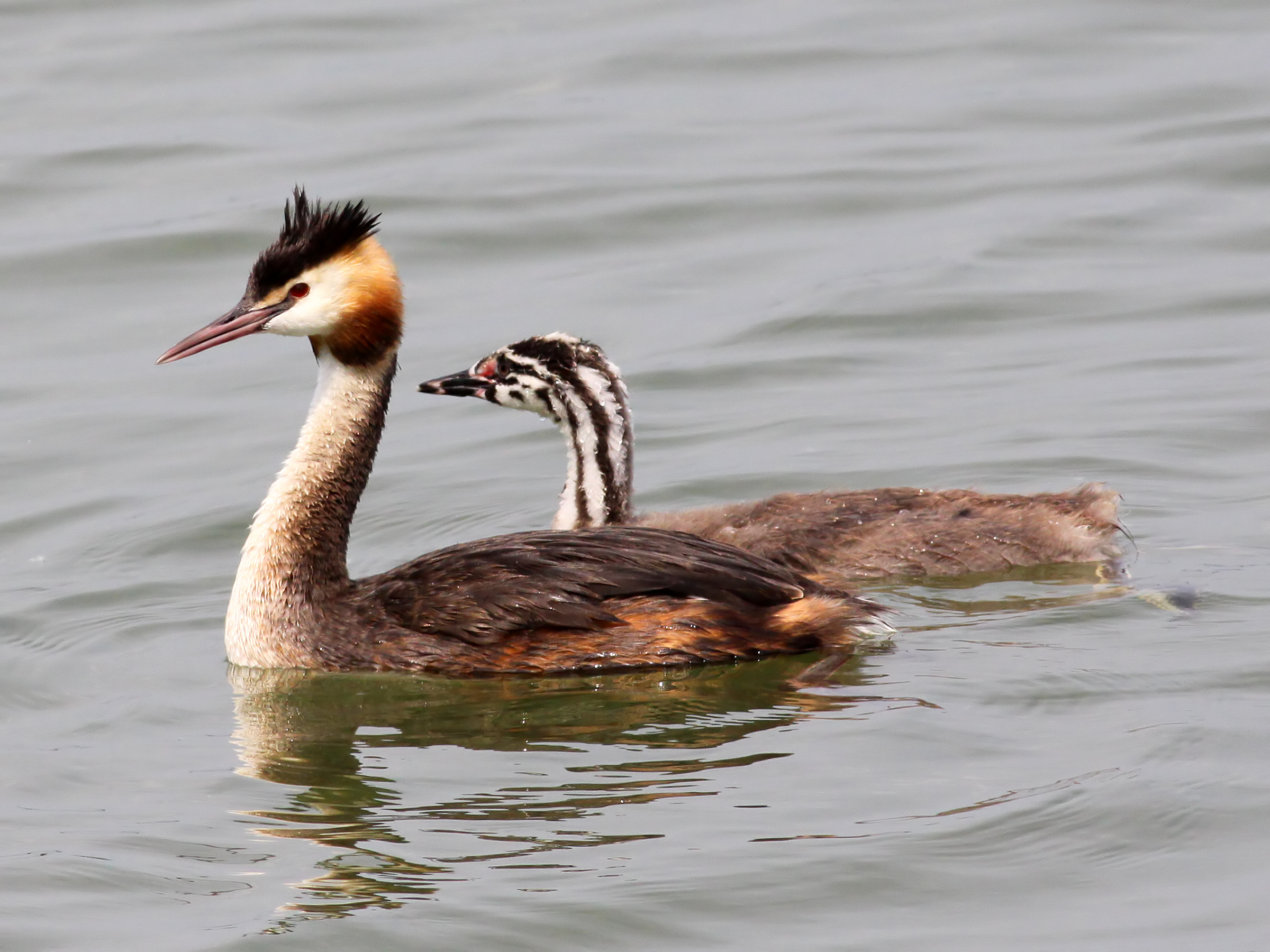
- Great crested grebe (Podiceps cristatus) adult with juvenile

Scientific classification
- Kingdom: Animalia
- Phylum: Chordata
- Class: Aves
- Clade: Mirandornithes
- Order: Podicipediformes
- Family: Podicipedidae
- Tribe: Podicipedini; Storer, 1963

Genera
- Aechmophorus; †Pliolymbus?; Podiceps; Poliocephalus?; Rollandia?; †Thiornis?

= Podicipedini =

Podicipedins Temporal range: Early Miocene-Holocene, 23.03–0 Ma

Tribe of birds

Podicipedini is a tribe of waterbirds belonging to the family Podicipedidae containing the genera Aechmophorus and Podiceps. Members of this tribe of grebes are characterized based on the presence of nuptial plumes and downy young with a bare crown patch. They are more specialized for diving though the anatomy that enables them to do so makes them weaker to stand upright. Further they have much complex mating dance rituals. Based on these characteristics, other possible genera in the clade include Poliocephalus and Rollandia. Indeed, a molecular phylogeny by Ogawa et al. (2015) using genetic data from 3 mitochondrial markers found Podiceps to be paraphyletic in respect to Rollandia, as the latter genus is more closely related to several New World species of the former genus. The inclusion of the Neogene genera of Pliolymbus and Thiornis is based on their possible reclassification as junior synonyms as Podiceps.

However, there is uncertainty as different positions has been found for some members. One morphological study from Fjeldså (2004) found Rollandia to be the basalmost extant genus of grebe, with Thiornis being classified as a stem-grebe. Another morphological study from Ksepka et al. (2013) found Podilymbus to be the sister genus to Rollandia, both more closer to Aechmophorus and Podiceps, while Poliocephalus and Thiornis to be closer to Tachybaptus.
