= Poliocephalus =

Poliocephalus and its counterparts poliocephala and poliocephalum are Greek words meaning 'grey-headed'. Poliocephalus is the name for a genus of grebes, while Poliocephala is the name for a genus of flies. The two words are often used as the second word of a binomial name.

Species names poliocephalus or poliocephala could refer to any of the following:

== Mammals ==
- the grey-headed flying-fox, Pteropus poliocephalus
- a tayra subspecies, Eira barbara poliocephala
- the white-headed langur, Trachypithecus poliocephalus

== Birds ==
- the ashy-headed goose Chloephaga poliocephala
- the brown-chested alethe Pseudalethe poliocephala
- the gray-crowned palm-tanager Phaenicophilus poliocephalus
- the gray-crowned yellowthroat Geothlypis poliocephala
- the grey-crowned flatbill Tolmomyias poliocephalus
- the grey-headed babbler Stachyris poliocephala
- the grey-headed greenbul Phyllastrephus poliocephalus
- the grey-headed swamphen Porphyrio (porphyrio) poliocephalus
- the hoary-headed grebe Poliocephalus poliocephalus
- the island thrush Turdus poliocephalus
- the lesser cuckoo Cuculus poliocephalus
- a little tinamou subspecies Crypturellus soui poliocephalus
- the mountain nightjar, Caprimulgus poliocephalus
- the New Guinea goshawk Accipiter poliocephalus
- the pink-bellied imperial pigeon Ducula poliocephala
- the west Mexican chachalaca Ortalis poliocephala
- the yellow-lored tody-flycatcher Todirostrum poliocephalum

== Insects ==
- the moth Acrocercops poliocephala
- the fly Trentepohlia poliocephala
