= Hunucornis =

Hunucornis Temporal range: Tortonian–Messinian

Scientific classification
- Kingdom: Animalia
- Phylum: Chordata
- Class: Aves
- Order: Podicipediformes
- Family: Podicipedidae
- Genus: †Hunucornis; Agnolín et al., 2025

Type species
- †Hunucornis huayanen Agnolín et al., 2025

Extinct water bird

Hunucornis huayanen is an extinct grebe species from the Las Flores Formation, a Miocene-aged deposit in central Argentina. It is known from two specimens containing fragmentary pieces of the left forelimb and femur. It is the oldest fossil evidence of grebes in South America.

== History ==
The holotype INGEO-PV-376 and the referred material INGEO-PV-371 were collected, along with other fossil bird remains, from several field expeditions to Candelaria Creek over ten years, soon later to be described by Federico L. Agnolín, Gerardo Álvarez Herrera, Sebastián Rozadilla, and Victor Contreras in a 2025 article about this late Miocene avian assemblage. The authors named the material Hunucornis huayanen, which the genus means "Hunuc's bird", which comes from Huarpe cosmogony about the first man who was friend to the animals, and the ephipet species name is Allentiac for "swim". The name refers to the fact H. huayanen is the oldest fossil evidence of grebes in South America.

== Classification ==
The authors (Agnolín et al., 2025) did not perform a phylogenetic analysis of Hunucornis placement in Podicipedidae. Still, due to the similarities mentioned above, the genus has anatomical features shared with Miobaptus of Early to Middle Miocene Eurasia. However, other aspects of the forelimb and the femur are also found in extant grebes but not in Miobaptus.

== Paleobiology ==
Hunucornis huayanen comes from the Huayquerian-aged Las Flores Formation, located in the Puchuzum area of the Calingasta Valley. The locale is dated between 8 and 5 million years ago. Based on the assemblage of avian fossils that have been recovered there, there seems to have been a significant freshwater habitat that supported a diverse array of waterbirds. These included waterfowl, palaelodids, herons, stilts, and avocets. The anatomy of Hunucornis supports their ecology as being more or less identical to extant grebes.
