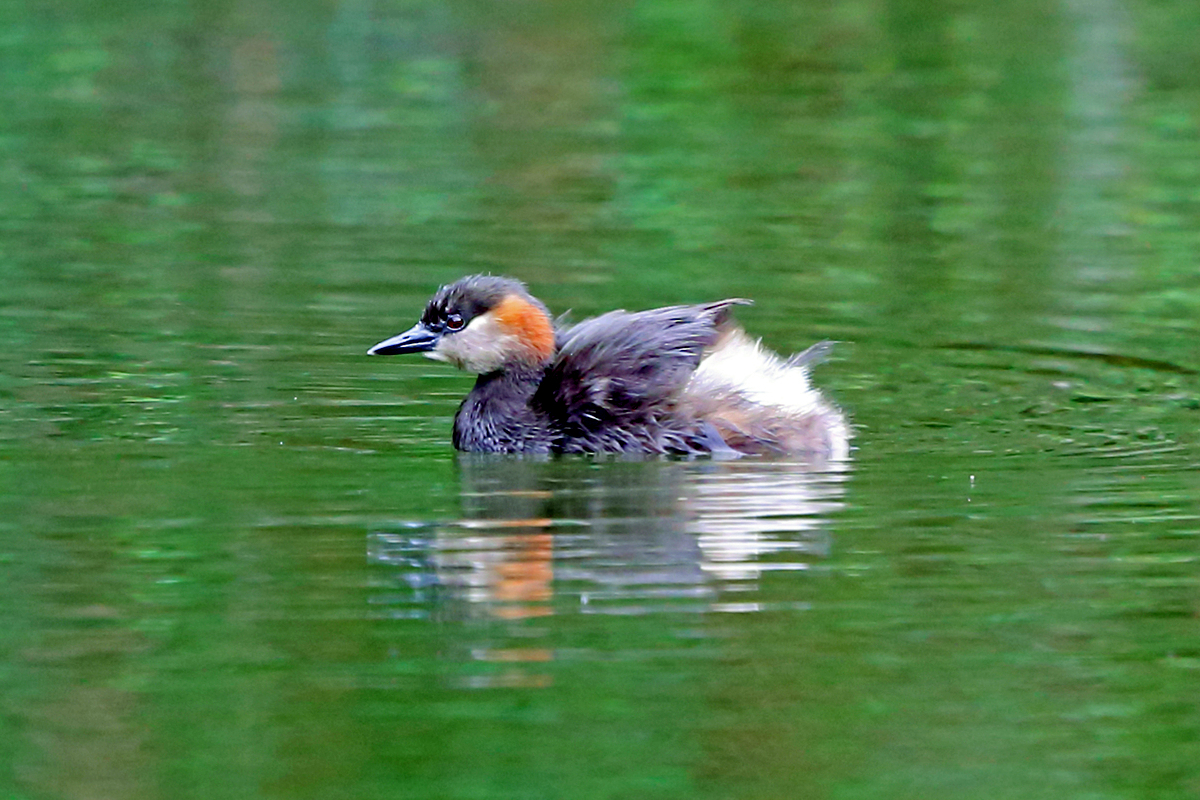
- Breeding plumage

Conservation status
- Endangered (IUCN 3.1)

Scientific classification
- Kingdom: Animalia
- Phylum: Chordata
- Class: Aves
- Order: Podicipediformes
- Family: Podicipedidae
- Genus: Tachybaptus
- Species: T. pelzelnii

Binomial name
- Tachybaptus pelzelnii (Hartlaub, 1861)

= Madagascar grebe =

Species of bird

The Madagascar grebe (Tachybaptus pelzelnii) is a grebe found only in western and central Madagascar. The binomial name commemorates the Austrian ornithologist August von Pelzeln. It is classified as endangered by the IUCN, with a population of less than 5,000. It is threatened by habitat loss, predation by carnivorous fish, and competition with introduced species.

== Description ==
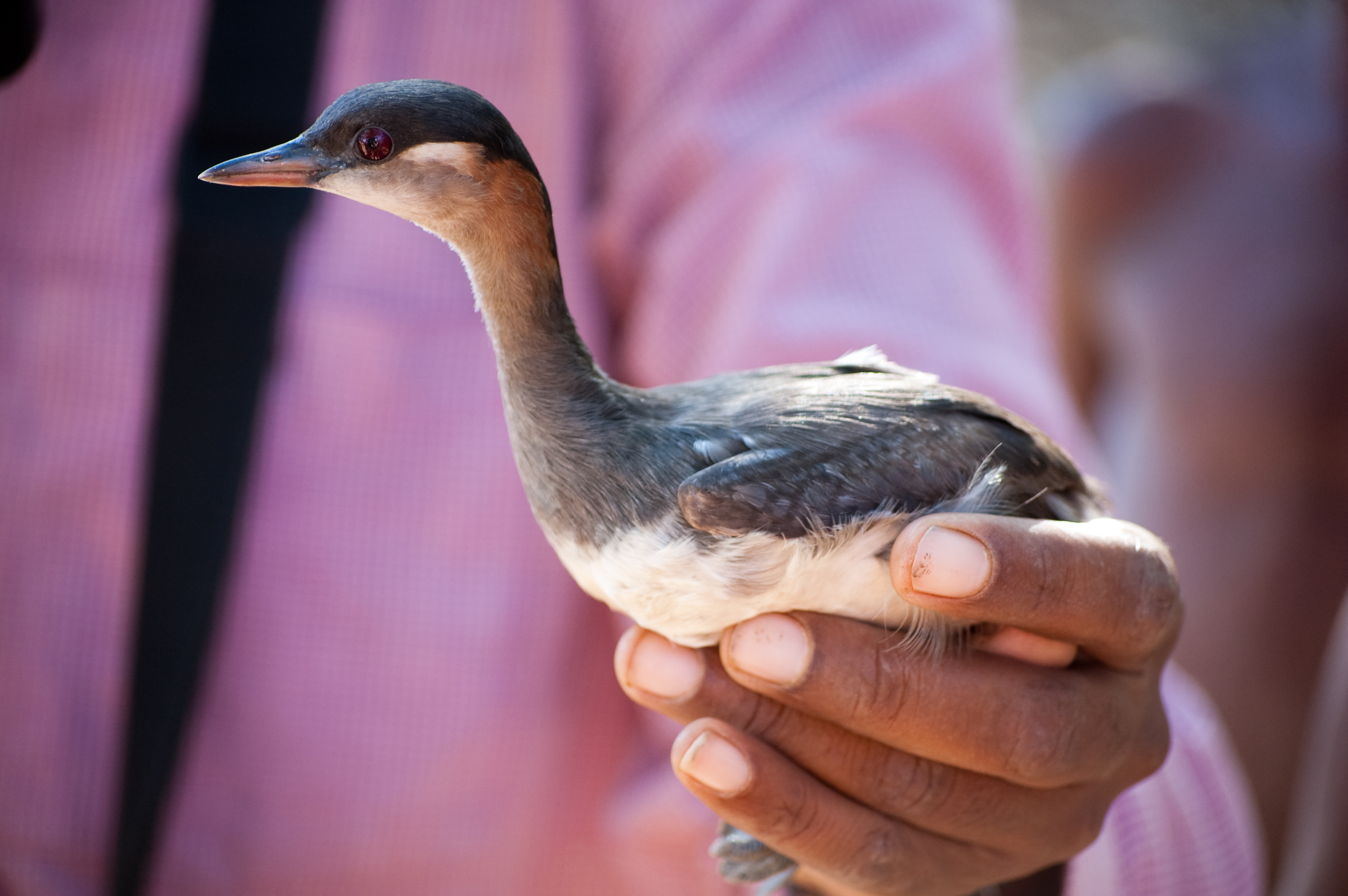
Bird caught for ringing, in non-breeding plumage

The Madagascar grebe is around 25 cm long. It can be identified in its breeding plumage, consisting of a blackish cap and line down the neck, often reddish rear ear-coverts and sides of the neck, pale grey cheeks, throat and foreneck. Some individuals have a narrow whitish line under the eye between the cap and ear-coverts.

== Distribution and habitat ==
The species is widespread throughout western and central Madagascar. Pairs can commonly be found near lakes. Surveys in the late 1990s recorded the species at 25 'Important Bird Areas' distributed throughout Madagascar, but it is suspected to be undergoing rapid declines. Numbers on Lake Alaotra have plummeted: in 1985 several hundred individuals were recorded, only 10–20 in 1993, and none in 1999. The forested lakes of the northwest plateau may harbour 100-200 individuals. The current total population may number as few as 1,500-2,500 individuals.

T. pelzelnii appears to prefer shallow, freshwater lakes and pools, with a dense covering of lily-pads, but it has also been found in several much deeper lakes. Has occasionally been seen near brackish waters and slow-flowing rivers.

== Ecology ==
The Madagascar grebe probably feeds mostly on insects, but is also known to take small fish and crustaceans. It is generally sedentary, but will move in search of more suitable habitat. The breeding season may span the months of August to March. Although breeding pairs are typically territorial, communally nesting groups of 150 individuals have been recorded. Nests are built on a floating structure of aquatic plants, anchored to offshore vegetation, normally waterlilies.

== Threats ==
The Madagascar grebe is currently classified as endangered by the IUCN. One of the most serious threats for the species is natural habitat loss by conversion for rice cultivation and cash crops. It is also being threatened by the introduction of exotic fish and fishery practice. At Lake Alaotra, adults are preyed on by carnivorous snakehead fish. They also in danger of entanglement in monofilament gill-nets. The introduction of exotic herbivorous fish (Coptodon zillii) has considerably limited the development of aquatic vegetation and favoured the little grebe (T. ruficollis). Competition with T. ruficollis is threatening T. pelzelnii, however both are considered vulnerable species. Increasing use of pesticides and fertilizers further exerts a damaging influence on freshwater ecosystems in Madagascar.

The present decline in the population is expected to accelerate over the next 10 years as increasing wetland conversion and overfishing continues to restrict the species to small lakes that are inaccessible and unsuitable for human use.

== Conservation ==
Various conservation actions are currently underway that benefit the Madagascar grebe. It has been recorded in six protected areas. To prioritise the wetlands for protection, a monitoring procedure has been proposed that uses birds, particularly T. pelzelnii, as indicators. The Malagasy government has recently ratified the Ramsar Convention, which is likely to improve conservation measures for wetlands and initiate dedicated studies of the decline of this species.
