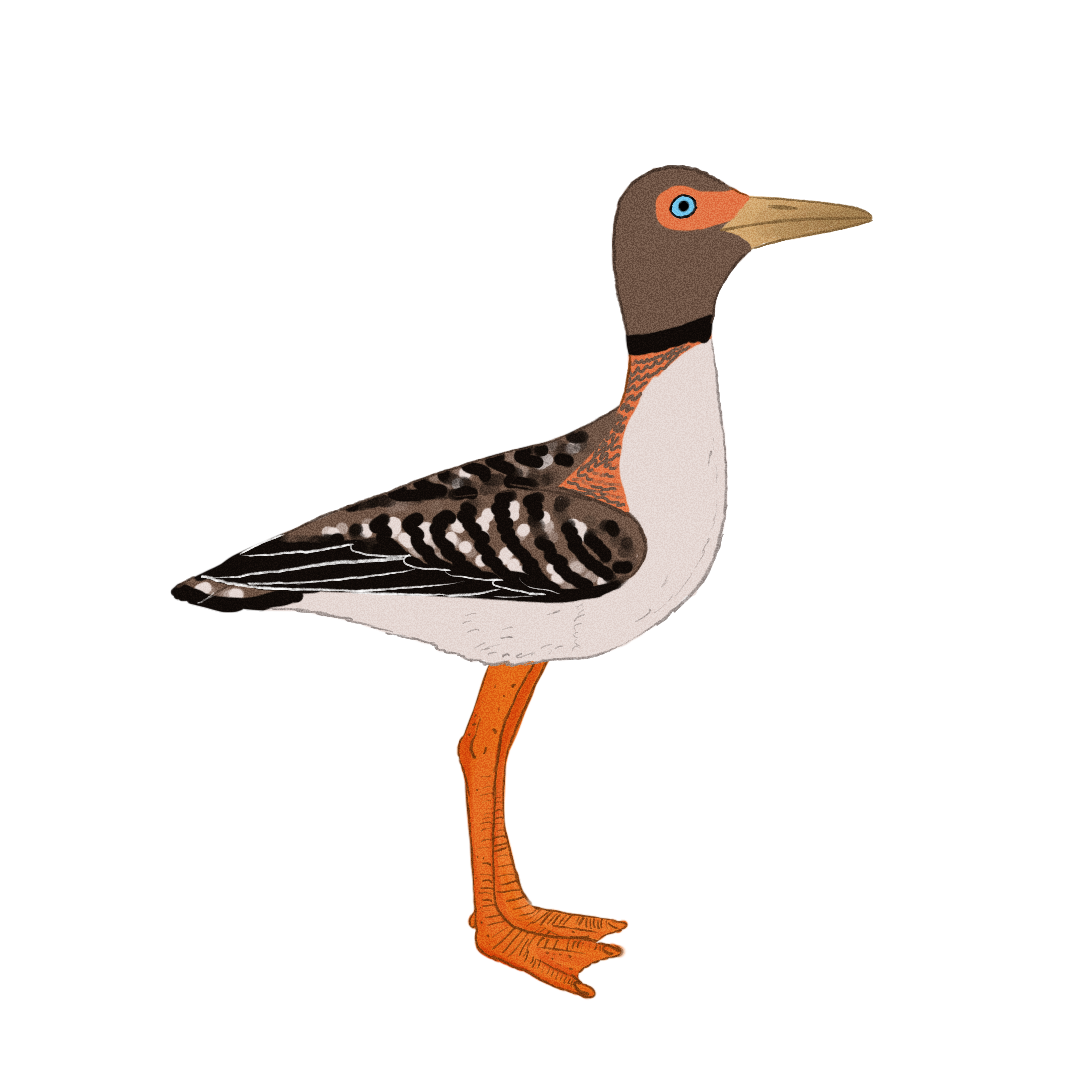
- Life restoration of Miodytes

Scientific classification
- Kingdom: Animalia
- Phylum: Chordata
- Class: Aves
- Order: Podicipediformes
- Family: Podicipedidae
- Genus: †Miodytes; Dimitreijevich, Gál & Kessler, 2002

Type species
- †Miodytes serbicus Dimitreijevich, Gál & Kessler, 2002

= Miodytes =

Miodytes Temporal range: Early Miocene

Extinct water bird

Miodytes is a fossil genus of grebe known from a nearly complete specimen from Valjevo Basin, western Serbia known from an almost complete right wing skeleton. It contains a single species, M. serbicus.

== History ==
The specimen was collected from Bela Stena, Suseoke village. The binomial nomenclature for Miodytes serbicus means "Serbian Miocene diver".

== Description ==
The holotype specimen of Miodytes is a slab that contains the right wing skeleton of the bird, nearly completed, consisting of the distal fragment of humerus, ulna, radius, carpometacarpus and parts of the wingtips (RGF 97/3). Due to the nature of the bones in the slab, the authors Dimitreijevich et al. (2002) used the humerus part and the carpometacarpus to provide comparative anatomy and a diagnosis. Miodytes can be differentiated from other grebes as the genus has a well developed epicondylus ventralis and a very deep and long sulcus musculi brachialis. The processus supracondylaris dorsalis is absent from the humerus. There are elements that are similar to grebes, petrels, and shorebirds from the specimen in which the authors proclaimed of the three groups, Miodytes is most similar to grebes.

== Classification ==
While Dimitreijevich et al. (2002) classifies Miodytes as a grebe, Ksepka et al. (2013) do not agree with the assessment. They are argued the diagnostic features that separate Miodytes from other grebes are more align with other seabirds. They stated there is no unambiguous synapomorphies that can confidently identify Miodytes as a grebe. Ksepka et al. (2013) argued at best Miodytes is a member of Mirandornithes, as it does have a strongly elongate phalanx II-1 which lacks an internal indicus process. More specimens are needed to established the taxonomic placement of this bird.

== Paleobiology ==
Miodytes is from the Early Miocene from the "Bela Stena series" from Valjevo Basin. The site is the oldest recorded lake formation with records of plant and insect remains, fish bones, and feathers. Fragmentary bird fossils have been retrieved but most cannot be identified at the species level. Inferring from the ecology of modern grebes and how the specimen was preserved, Dimitreijevich et al. (2002) suggested Miodytes was a migratory species and the individual died from an accident, not predation.
