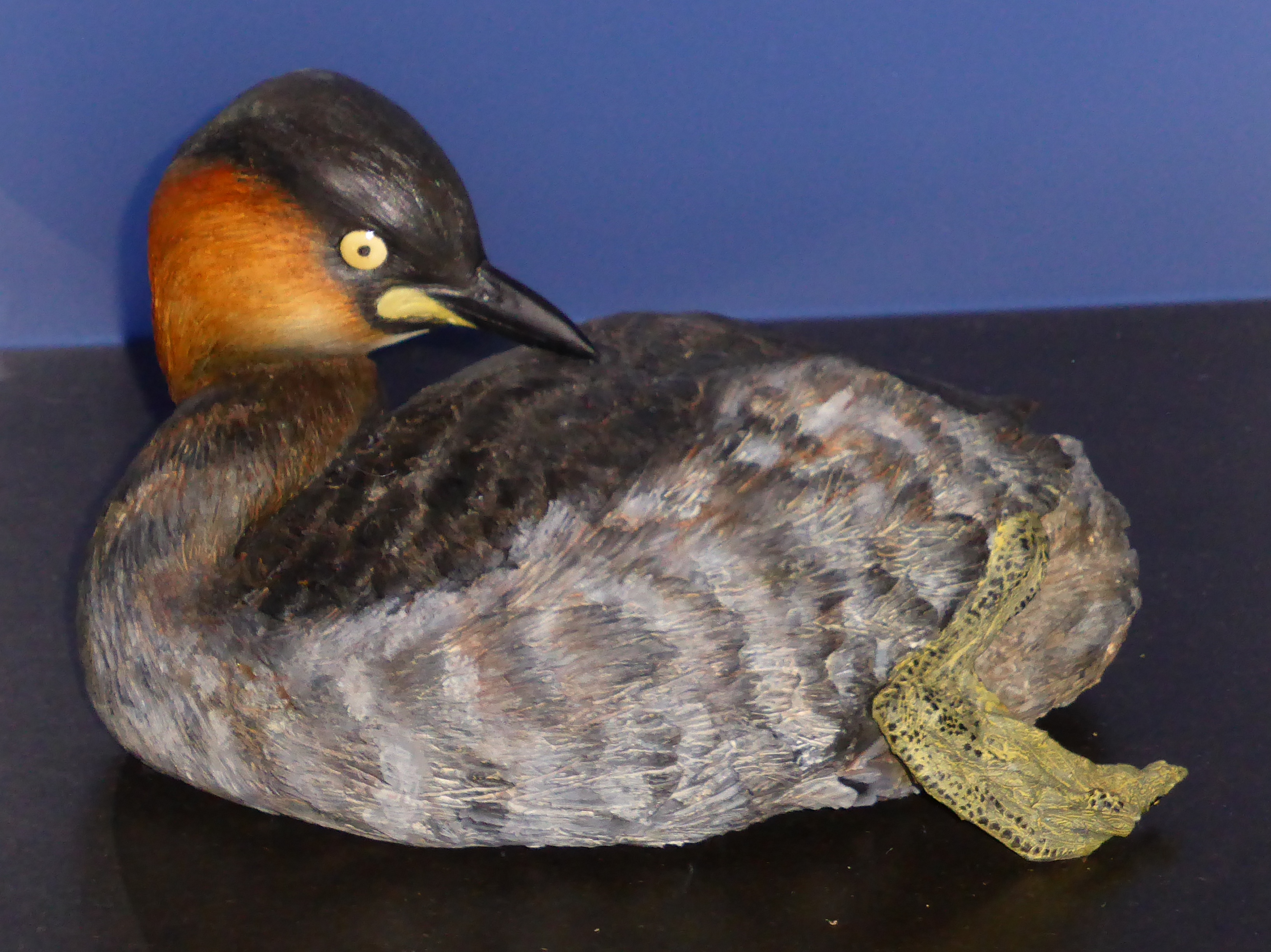

Conservation status
- Extinct (2010) (IUCN 3.1)

Scientific classification
- Kingdom: Animalia
- Phylum: Chordata
- Class: Aves
- Order: Podicipediformes
- Family: Podicipedidae
- Genus: Tachybaptus
- Species: †T. rufolavatus

Binomial name
- †Tachybaptus rufolavatus (Delacour, 1932)
- Alaotra grebe range

= Alaotra grebe =

Species of bird

The Alaotra grebe (Tachybaptus rufolavatus), also known as Delacour's little grebe or rusty grebe, is an extinct species of grebe that was endemic to Lake Alaotra and surrounding lakes in Madagascar. Its extinction has been attributed primarily to the introduction of carnivorous fish into its native habitat, which likely preyed on the grebe or competed with it for food. The last confirmed sightings occurred in either 1983 or 1985, and the species was officially declared extinct in 2010.

== Description ==
The Alaotra grebe measured about 25 cm (9.8 in) in length. Its small wings limited its ability to fly over long distances. The species showed little sexual dimorphism, although males were slightly larger than females.

== Diet ==
The Alaotra grebe fed primarily on fish, although insects were found in the stomachs of some specimens. Its relatively large, stout bill was characteristic of a piscivorous diet.

== Breeding ==
The breeding behavior of the Alaotra grebe was largely undocumented. Because little and Alaotra grebes were able to successfully pair off, it is suspected that courtship and pair formation took place in December, while most breeding activity took place between January and March. However, based on some observations of older juveniles with their mothers in late May and early June 1929, it is suspected that some egg laying must have occurred in April to June. Otherwise, the behavior of this grebe is undescribed, although it is suspected to have behaved similarly to the closely related little grebe.

== Extinction ==
The species underwent a sustained decline throughout the 20th century, driven primarily by habitat destruction, entanglement in monofilament gill nets and predation by the introduced blotched snakehead (Channa maculata). As the population diminshed, the remaining birds increasingly hybridized with little grebes. Because the two species differed in several morphological and ecological characteristics, these hybrids may have exhibited reduced fitness, potentially accelerating the erosion of the T. rufolavatus gene pool.

The Madagascar pochard, which also inhabited Lake Alaotra, was considered extinct until its rediscovery in 2006. In contrast, the Alaotra grebe had limited dispersal capabilities and was never recorded beyond the lake.

The last confirmed sighting of the species was in 1985, although the individual may have been a hybrid with the little grebe. The Alaotra grebe was formally declared extinct in 2010. Only one photograph of the species is known to exist. Although species presumed extinct have occasionally been rediscovered, Leon Bennun, then director of the conservation organization BirdLife International, stated that "no hope remains for this species", attributing its extinction to the "unforeseen consequences" of human action.

This extinction brought the number of confirmed bird extinctions since 1600 AD to 162. The previous declaration of a bird species as extinct was that of the Liverpool pigeon (Caloenas maculata) in 2008. However, that was more a problem of taxonomic recognition as that species was last recorded alive in the late 18th or early 19th century.

== Distribution and habitat ==
"This aquatic species exhibited endemism to the island of Madagascar, exclusively inhabiting the environs of Lake Alaotra and adjacent water bodies. Notably, this grebe displayed a marked preference for the reed beds and papyrus clusters in the vicinity of the lake, which served as its primary nesting habitat."

== Gallery ==
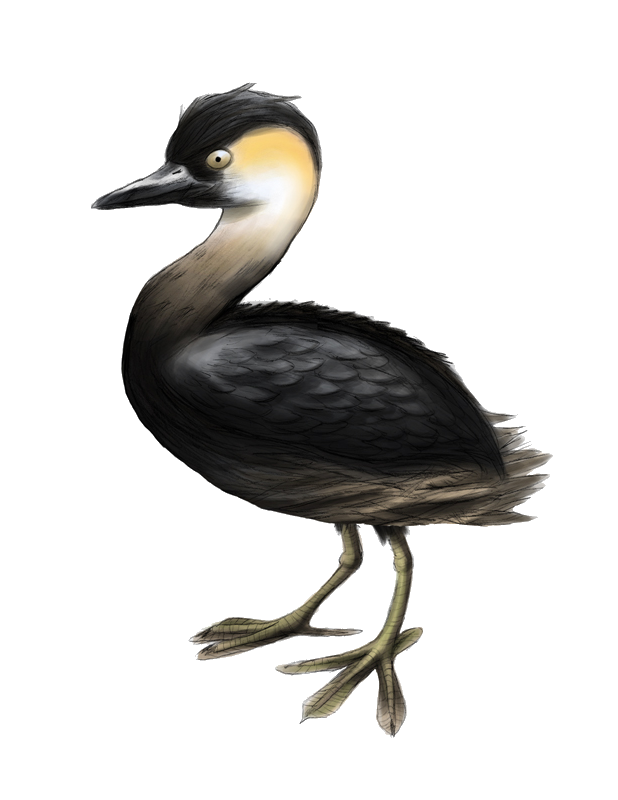
An artist's reconstruction.

== See also ==
- Atitlán grebe, extinct since 1989 for similar reasons
- Endemic birds of Madagascar and western Indian Ocean islands
