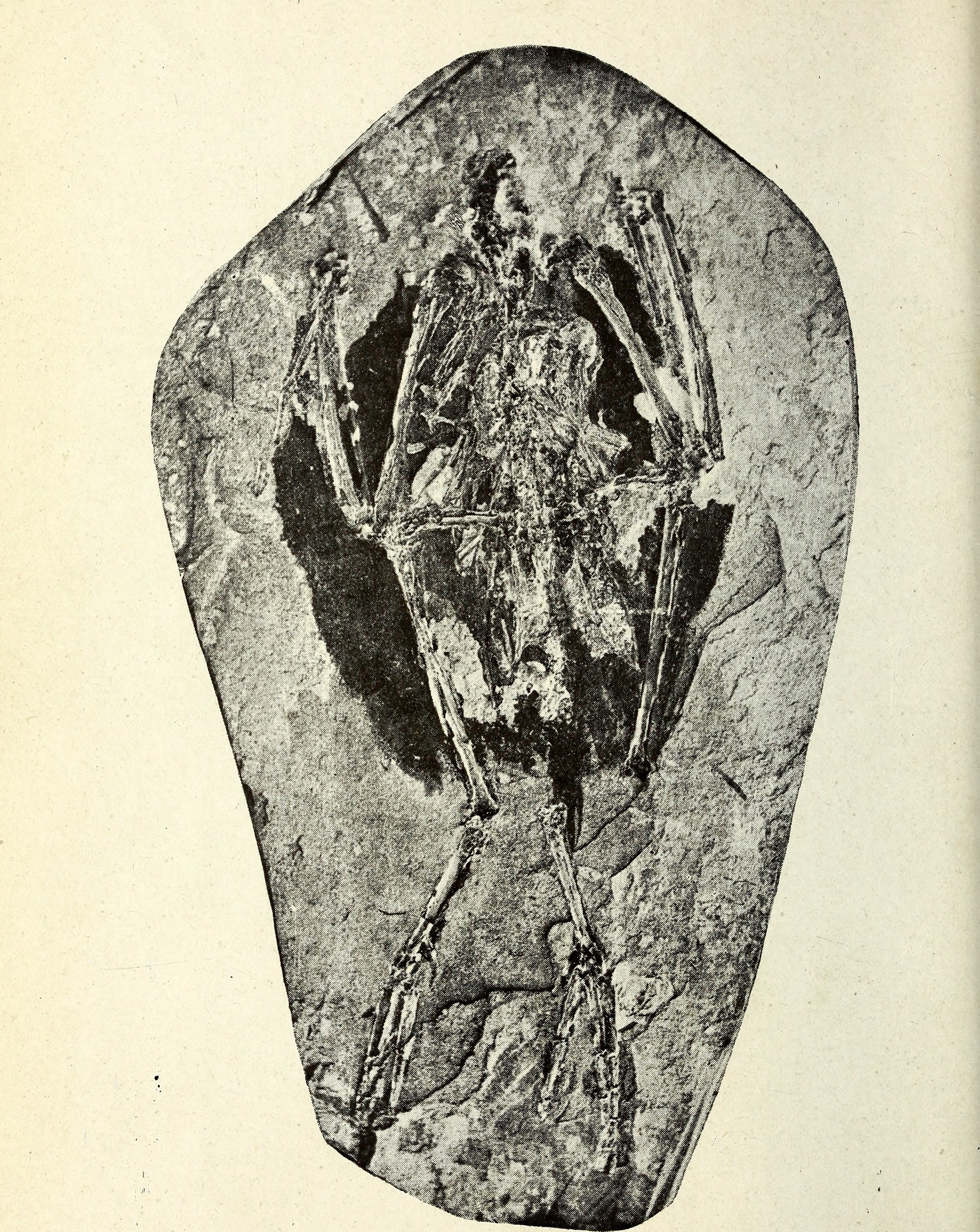
- Fossil slab of Thiornis sociata

Scientific classification
- Kingdom: Animalia
- Phylum: Chordata
- Class: Aves
- Order: Podicipediformes
- Family: Podicipedidae
- Genus: †Thiornis; Navás, 1922

Type species
- †Thiornis sociata Navás, 1922

Synonyms
- Podiceps sociatus (Navás, 1922) sensu Olson, 1995

= Thiornis =

Thiornis Temporal range: Tortonian

Extinct water bird

Thiornis is a fossil genus of Middle Miocene grebe known from a nearly complete specimen from Libros, Spain. Originally classified as a type of moorhen, Thiornis has since been classified as a species of grebe. The overall anatomy of the bird is identical to modern grebes. It contains a single species, T. sociata.

== History ==
The specimen was described by the Spanish Jesuit priest and entomologist Longinos Navás. Despite being of such distinction, Navás had described several vertebrates from the locality. For a while the whereabouts since its description was unknown, but unbeknownst to the scientific community, the slab was on display in the Paris Museum at least since 1930 where it was finally reexamine for a 1995 redescription by American biologist and ornithologist Storrs L. Olson.

== Description ==
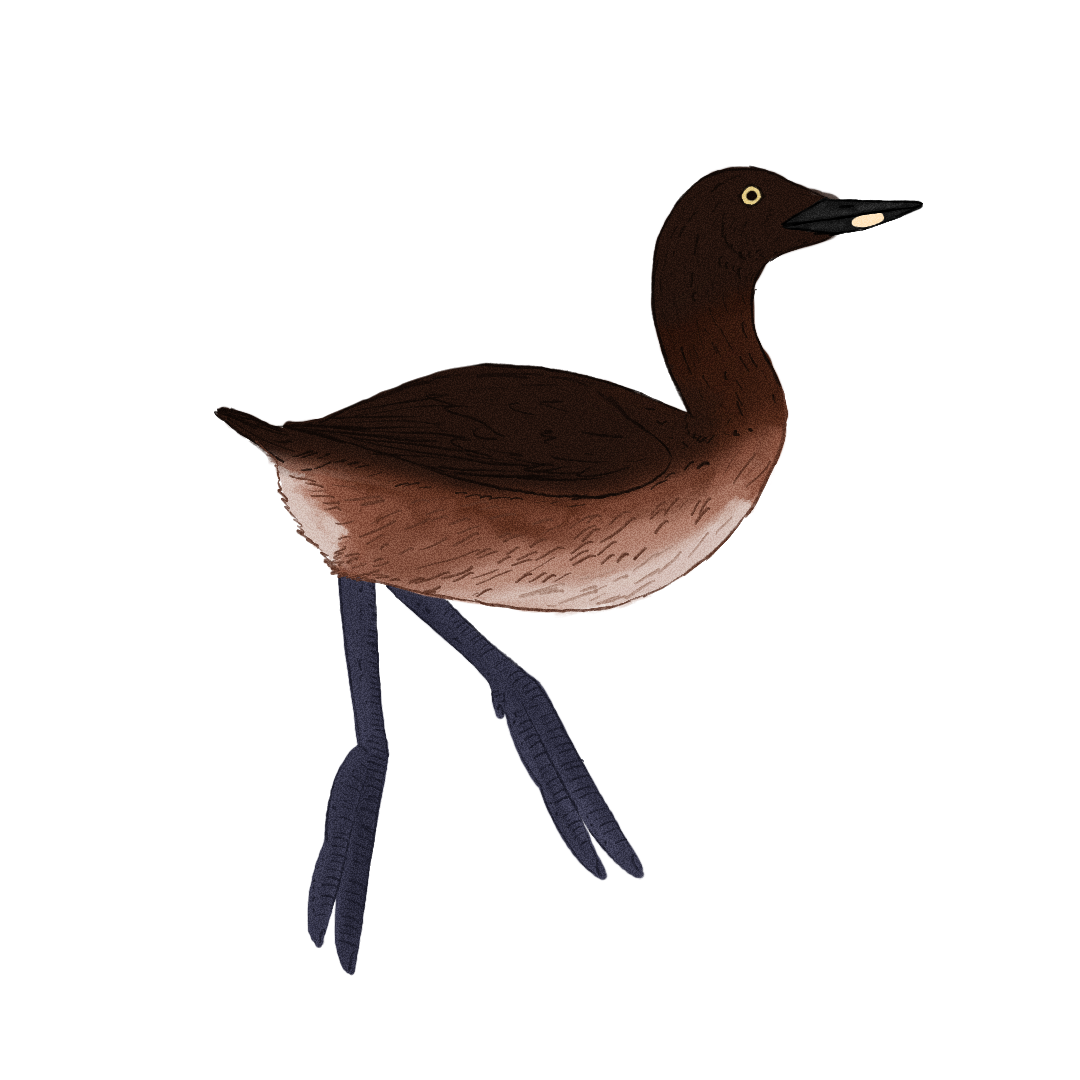
Life reconstruction of Thiornis sociata.

The holotype of Thiornis is known from a virtually completed specimen that majority of it consists of postcranial material and even feather impressions (MNHN 1930-1). Parts missing from the bird are the cranial remains, some cervical bones and the toe-bones of the right foot. Based on the dimensional measurement of the bones, Thiornis was closer in size to the horned grebe (Podiceps auritus). The coracoid is similar to genera Tachybaptus and Poliocephalus, as the head does not project as far ventrally as seen in other extant genera of grebes. The furcula is also similar to Tachybaptus and Poliocephalus for the clavicle in lateral view is much less curved, but the shaft is more robust than any of the extant genera. Features in the sternum is identical to modern grebes. The pectoral crest of the humeri is not incised, but rounded and greatly expanded. The shaft of the ulna is also more robust than seen in Podiceps. Wingbones are the same in other grebes being straight, slender and narrower in comparison to other diving birds. The pelvis is compressed laterally, with the posterior portion being broad as the ilia flares outward. The ischia are very long and narrow and extend posteriorly well beyond the sacrum and place oriented towards the point of the ilium. This is another featured that is shared with Tachybaptus and Poliocephalus. The femur is identical in all extant genera except Podilymbus, where the femur of Podilymbus is more slender and elongated. The tibiotarsus is relatively short and wide, a featured shared with Podiceps though in Thiornis the femur has an enlarged cnemial crest. The tarsometatarsus is, however, more similar to the smaller grebe genera like Tachybaptus.

== Classification ==
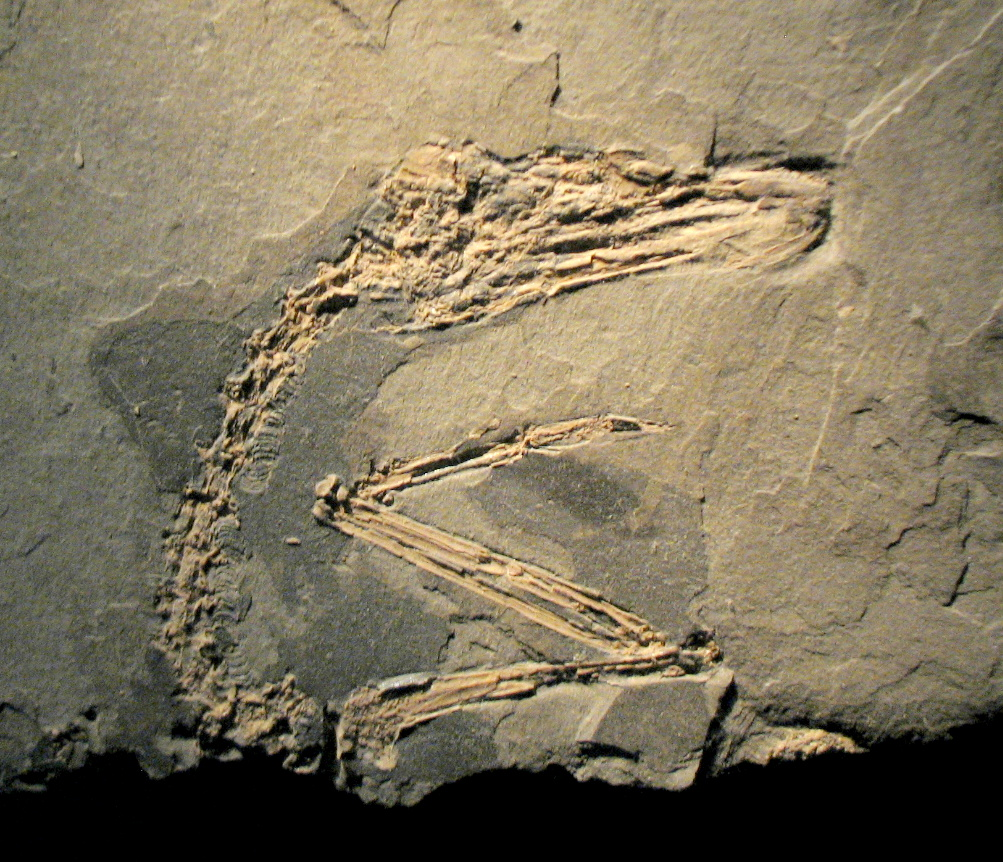
Fossil in Dinópolis

Navás (1922) had initially classified Thiornis as a rallid in the Fulicini tribe with the moorhens, a classification that was supported by subsequent authors until Olson (1995) found the bird to be a grebe instead. While Olson does note the overall similarity between Tachybaptus and Thiornis, postulating there might be some relationship between the two, he recommended classifying the specimen as a species of Podiceps (Podiceps sociatus) due how much larger the specimen is to the extant species of Tachybaptus as well as using Podiceps as placeholder given how morphologically diverse members of Podiceps are. However this view is not supported by other scientists. Storer (2000) argued that the size and dimensions of the bones are not good at determining phylogenetic relationships among grebes alone, thus Thiornis should either be considered a valid genus or at least a species of Tachybaptus. This viewpoint was supported by Ksepka et al. (2013) finding two placements for Thiornis. One being in a massive polytomy with several of the smaller species of grebe and the other being part of a subclade grebes that also includes Tachybaptus and Poliocephalus in a polytomy of their own. Alternatively Fjeldså (2004) treated Thiornis as an ancestral stem-grebe instead.

== Paleobiology ==
The holotype specimen was found in Libros, Province of Teruel from the Libros Basin dating to the Vallesian. Despite the age of the fossil, the anatomy of Thiornis suggests an ecology that is not unlike that of those of modern grebes as the group as a whole are homogeneous at the osteological level.
