= Pliolymbus =

Pliolymbus Temporal range: Piacenzian–Gelasian

Scientific classification
- Kingdom: Animalia
- Phylum: Chordata
- Class: Aves
- Order: Podicipediformes
- Family: Podicipedidae
- Genus: †Pliolymbus; Murray, 1967

Type species
- †Pliolymbus baryosteus Murray, 1967

Extinct water bird

Pliolymbus is a fossil genus of grebe known from the Late Pliocene to Early Pleistocene of United States and Mexico. It is known from a single species, P. baryosteus.

== History ==
The specimens were collected in the summer of 1950 from Kansas, United States by Claude W. Hibbard and the species was named in 1967 by Bertram G. Murray. The binomial nomenclature for the species means “heavy bone Pliocene diver” in reference of the age and skeletal features of the grebe. Howard (1969) published a specimen collected from Lake Chapala from a series of field surveys in the region from 1926, 1958 and 1963.

== Description ==
A total of six specimens of Pliolymbus have been recovered. The holotype consists of the anterior portion of the sternum (UMMP 51839). The additional specimens are a humerus (UMMP 51840), proximal of a coracoid (UMMP 51841), the shaft of a tarsometatarsus (UMMP 51844), and a more incomplete specimen that has more complete remains of coracoids, an ulna and carpometacarpus, a near complete cervical vertebrae and various portions of raddii, scapula, femur, synsacrum, two ribs and an unidentified bone (UMMP 27173). Pliolymbus was a genus of small grebe with an incredibly robust skeleton, more-so than the skeletons of extant grebes. The coracoid is similar in size to the least grebe and is more robust and has a broader base like those in the red-necked grebe (Podiceps grisegena) and black-necked grebe (Podiceps nigricollis). The distal end of the humerus is about the same size as the white-tufted grebe, but the humerus shaft is stouter. The ulna is also longer than the least grebe (Tachybaptus dominicus) and white-tufted grebe (Rollandia rolland) but short in comparison to the black-necked grebe. The robustness of the ulna however is comparable to the female members of the black-necked grebe. The carpometacarpus is comparable to the white-tufted grebe in length but the diameter of it is closer in size to female black-necked grebes, yet it is short overall in comparison with other grebes. A Mexican specimen consisting of the upper right portion of the coracoid has also been recorded (LACM 2891).

== Classification ==
Pliolymbus has no close living relatives among the modern grebes, being part of an extinct lineage of grebes that died out by the end of the Pliocene. However Olson (1985) question the validity of the genus and suggest Pliolymbus baryosteus might be a species of Podiceps instead.

== Paleobiology ==
Pliolymbus is from the Piacenzian age of the Pliocene to the Gelasian age of the Pleistocene from the Fox Canyon section of the Rexroad Formation from Kansas and Lake Chapala from Jalisco.
