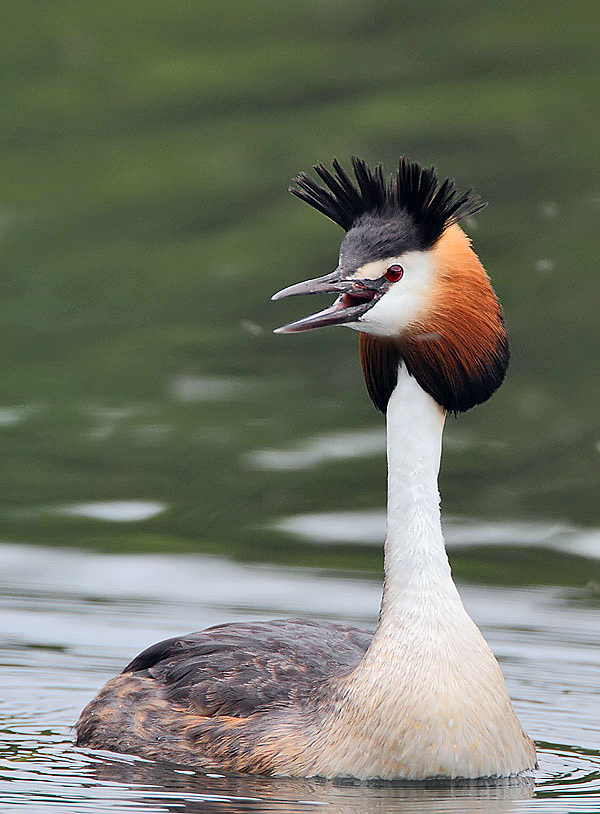
- Great crested grebe (Podiceps cristatus)

Scientific classification
- Kingdom: Animalia
- Phylum: Chordata
- Class: Aves
- Clade: Neoaves
- Clade: Mirandornithes
- Order: Podicipediformes; Fürbringer, 1888
- Family: Podicipedidae; Bonaparte, 1831

Type genus
- Podiceps

Subclades
- †Hunucornis; †Miobaptus; †Miodytes; †Pliolymbus; †Thiornis; Podilymbini; Podicipedini

= Grebe =

Grebes Temporal range: Early Miocene – Holocene, 23.03–0 Ma

Order of birds

Grebes (/ˈɡriːbz/) are aquatic diving birds in the order Podicipediformes (/ˌpɒdɪsɪˈpɛdɪfɔːrmiːz/). Grebes are widely distributed freshwater birds, with some species also found in marine habitats during migration and winter. Most grebes fly, although some flightless species exist, most notably in stable lakes. The order contains a single family, the Podicipedidae, which includes 22 species in six extant genera.

Although, superficially, they resemble other diving birds such as loons and coots, they are most closely related to flamingos, as supported by morphological, molecular and paleontological data. Many species are monogamous and are known for their courtship discipline, with the pair performing synchronized dances across the water's surface. The birds build floating vegetative nests where they lay several eggs. About a third of the world's grebes are listed at various levels of conservation concerns—the biggest threats including habitat loss, the introduction of invasive predatory fish and human poaching. As such, three species have gone extinct.

== Etymology ==
The word "grebe" comes from the French grèbe, which is of unknown origin and dates to 1766. It is possibly from the Breton krib meaning 'comb', this referring to the crests of many of the European species. However, grèbe was used to refer to gulls. The appearance of "grebe" in the English language was introduced in 1768 by the Welsh naturalist Thomas Pennant when he adopted the word for the family. Some of the smaller species are often referred to as "dabchick", which originated in the mid-16th century in English, as they were said to be chick-like birds that dive. The clade names "Podicipediformes" and "Podicipedidae" are based on the genus Podiceps which is a combination of Latin of podex, gen. podicis ("rear-end" or "anus") and pes ("foot"), a reference to the placement of a grebe's legs towards the rear of its body.

== Field characteristics ==
Grebes are small to medium-large in size ranging from the least grebe (Tachybaptus dominicus), at 120 g (4.2 oz) and 23.5 cm (9.3 in), to the great grebe (Podiceps major), at 1.7 kg (3.7 lb) and 71 cm (28 in). Despite these size differences, grebes are a homogeneous family of waterbirds with very few or slight differences among the genera.

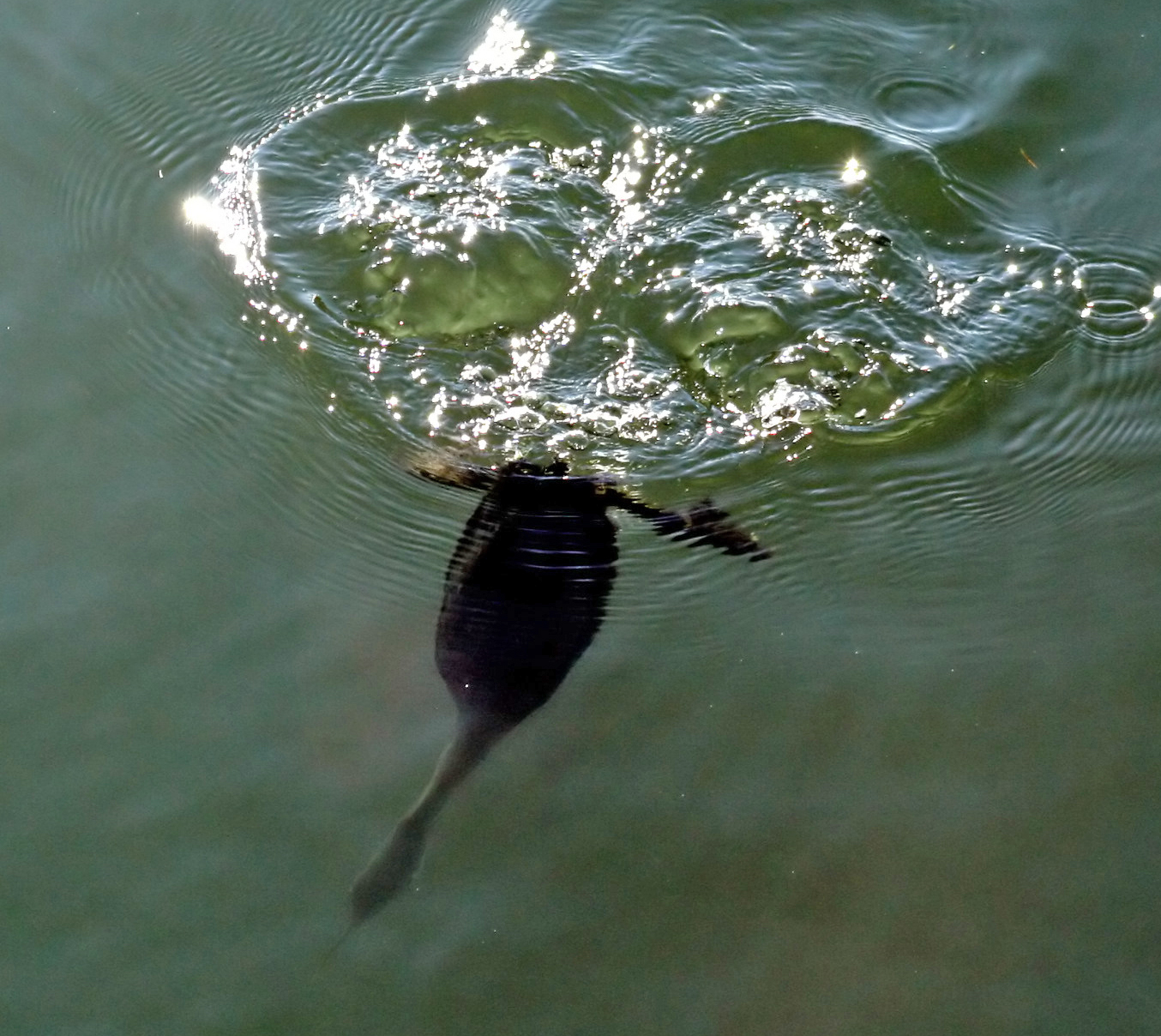
A diving grebe showing how the hindlimbs are propelling the bird underwater

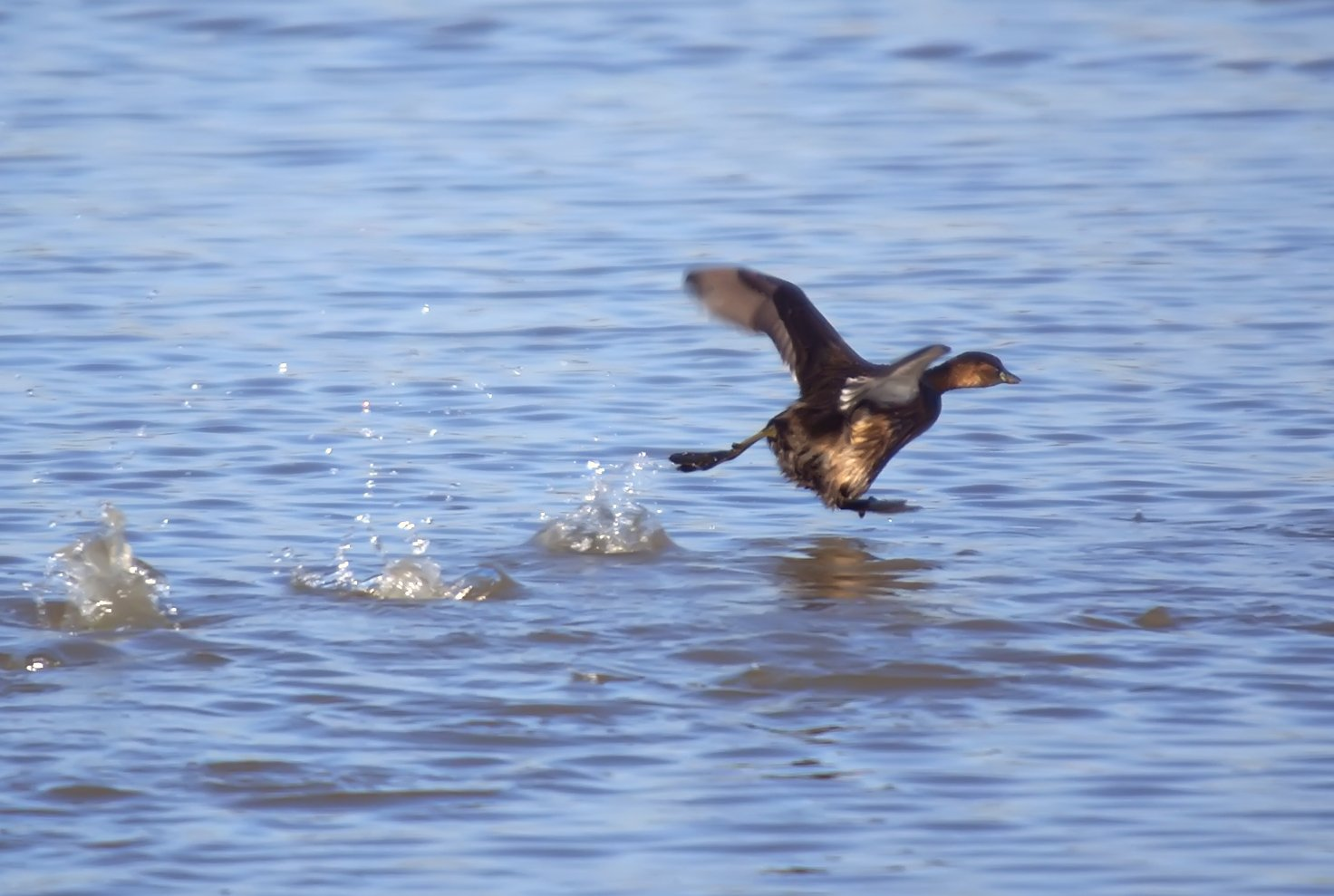
A little grebe (Tachybaptus ruficollis) running along the surface of the water as it flaps its wings to get the lift it needs to fly

=== Anatomy and physiology ===
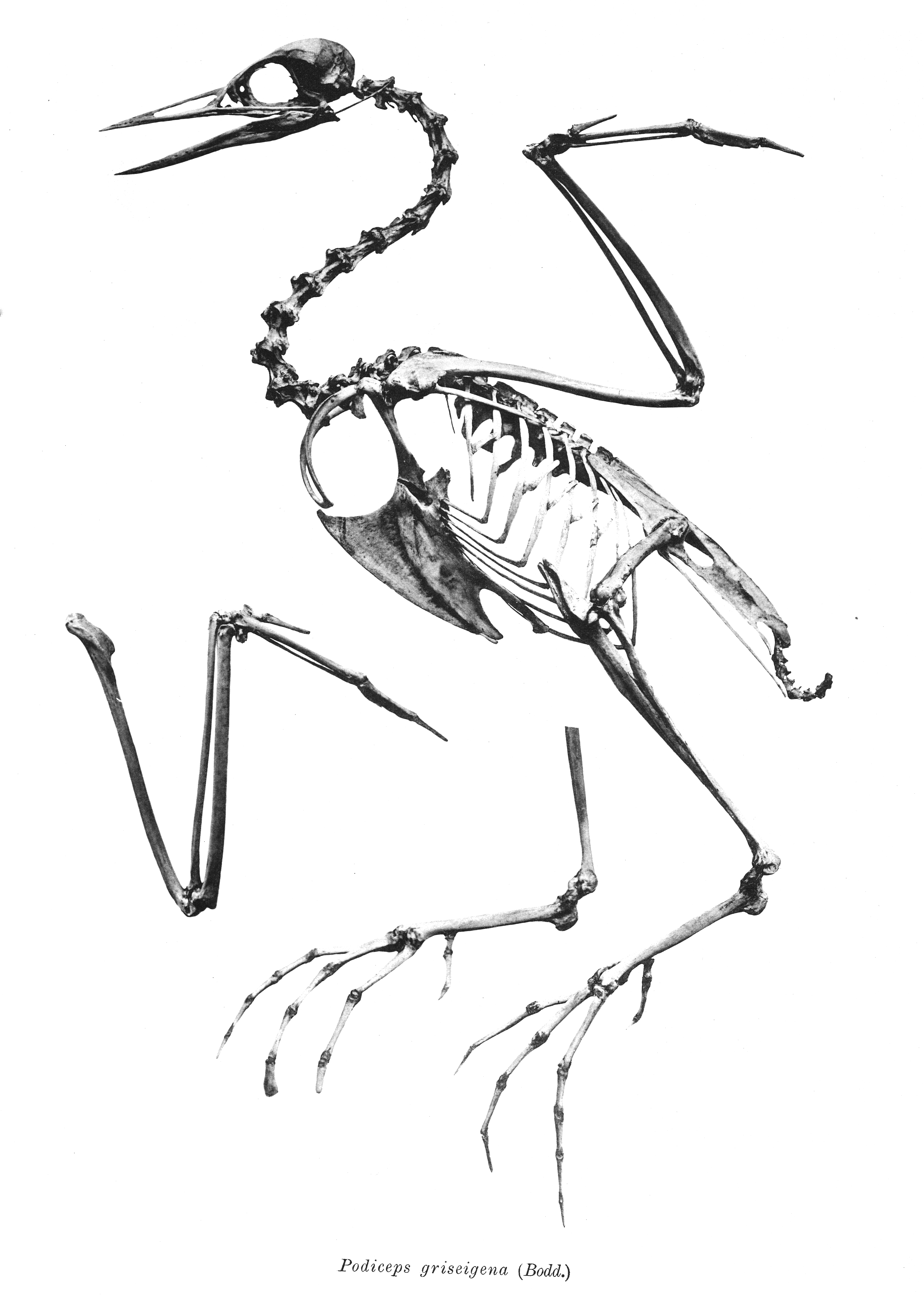
A skeleton of a red-necked grebe (Podiceps grisegena). Note that the pelvic girdle is bigger than the sternum.

On the surface of the water, they swim low with just the head and neck exposed. All species have lobed toes and are excellent swimmers and divers. The feet are always large, with broad lobes on the toes and small webs connecting the front three toes. The hind toe also has a small lobe. The claws are similar to nails and are flat. These lobate feet act as an oar, as when moving forward, they provide minimum resistance, and moving backwards, they provide maximum coverage.

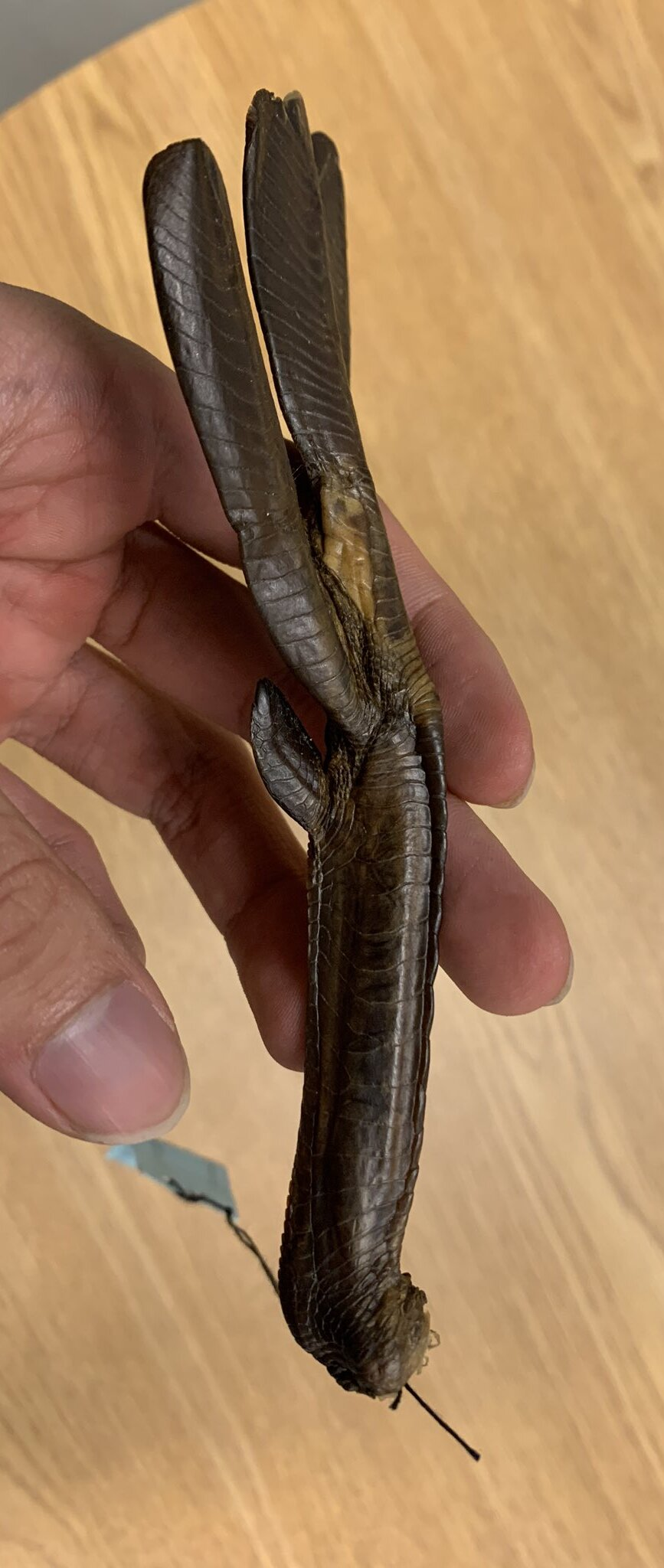
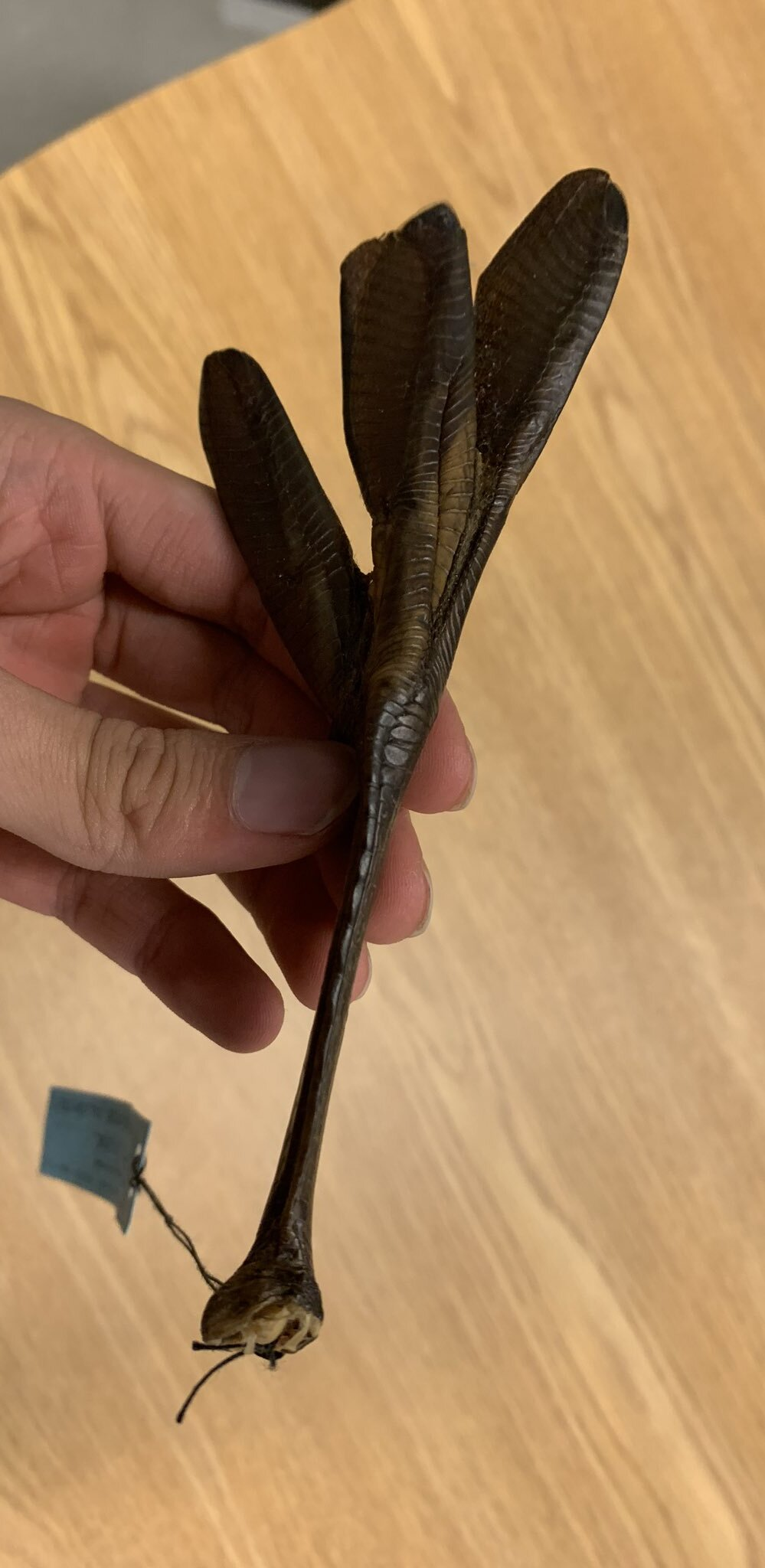
Grebe foot, showing the lobed toes and strongly keeled tarsometatarsus

The leg bones (femur and tarsometatarsus) are equal in length, with the femur having a large head and the presence of long cnemial crests in the tarsometatarsus. The patella is separate and supports the tarsometatarsus posteriorly, which greatly helps with the contraction of the muscles. They swim by simultaneously spreading out the feet and bringing them inward, with the webbing expanded to produce the forward thrust in much the same way as frogs. However, due to the anatomy of the legs, grebes are not as mobile on land as they are on the water. Although they can run for a short distance, they are prone to falling over, since they have their feet placed far back on the body.

The wing shape varies depending on the species, ranging from moderately long to incredibly short and rounded in shape. The wing anatomy in grebes has a relatively short and thin carpometacarpus-phalanges component, which supports their primary feathers, while the ulna is long and fairly weak, supporting secondary feathers. There are 11 primaries and 17 to 22 secondaries, with the inner secondaries being longer than the primaries. As such, grebes are generally not strong or rapid fliers. Some species are reluctant to fly. Indeed, several have become flightless. In these flightless species, they tend to have a reduction in the length of their wings, tails, and primaries; reduced pectoral muscles, and a significant increase in body size. Since grebes generally dive more than fly, the sternum can be as small or even smaller than the pelvic girdle. When they do fly, they often launch themselves off from the water and must run along the surface as they flap their wings to provide a lift.

Bills vary from short and thick to long and pointed, depending on the diet, and are slightly larger in males than in females (though the sizes can overlap between younger males and females).

=== Feathers ===
Grebes have unusual plumage. On average, grebes have 20,000 feathers, the third highest number recorded among birds, after the Tundra Swan and the Emperor Penguin. The feathers are very dense and strongly curved. In the larger species, feathers are denser but shorter, while the opposite is true in smaller species, where the feathers are longer but less dense.

The density and length of feathers are correlated exponentially with heat loss in cold water. For this reason, grebes invest the most time and effort of all birds in plumage maintenance. The uropygial glands secrete a high concentration of paraffin. The secretion provides a dual purpose of protecting the feathers from external parasites and fungi, as well as waterproofing them. When preening, grebes eat their feathers and feed them to their young. The function of this behaviour is uncertain, but it is believed to assist with pellet formation, excreting out internal parasites and protecting their insides from sharp bone material during digestion. The ventral plumage is the most dense, described as very fur-like. By pressing their feathers against the body, grebes can adjust their buoyancy. In the non-breeding season, grebes are plain-coloured in dark browns and whites. However, most have ornate and distinctive breeding plumages, often developing chestnut markings on the head area, and perform elaborate display rituals. The young, particularly those of the genus Podiceps, are often striped and retain some of their juvenile plumage even after reaching full size.

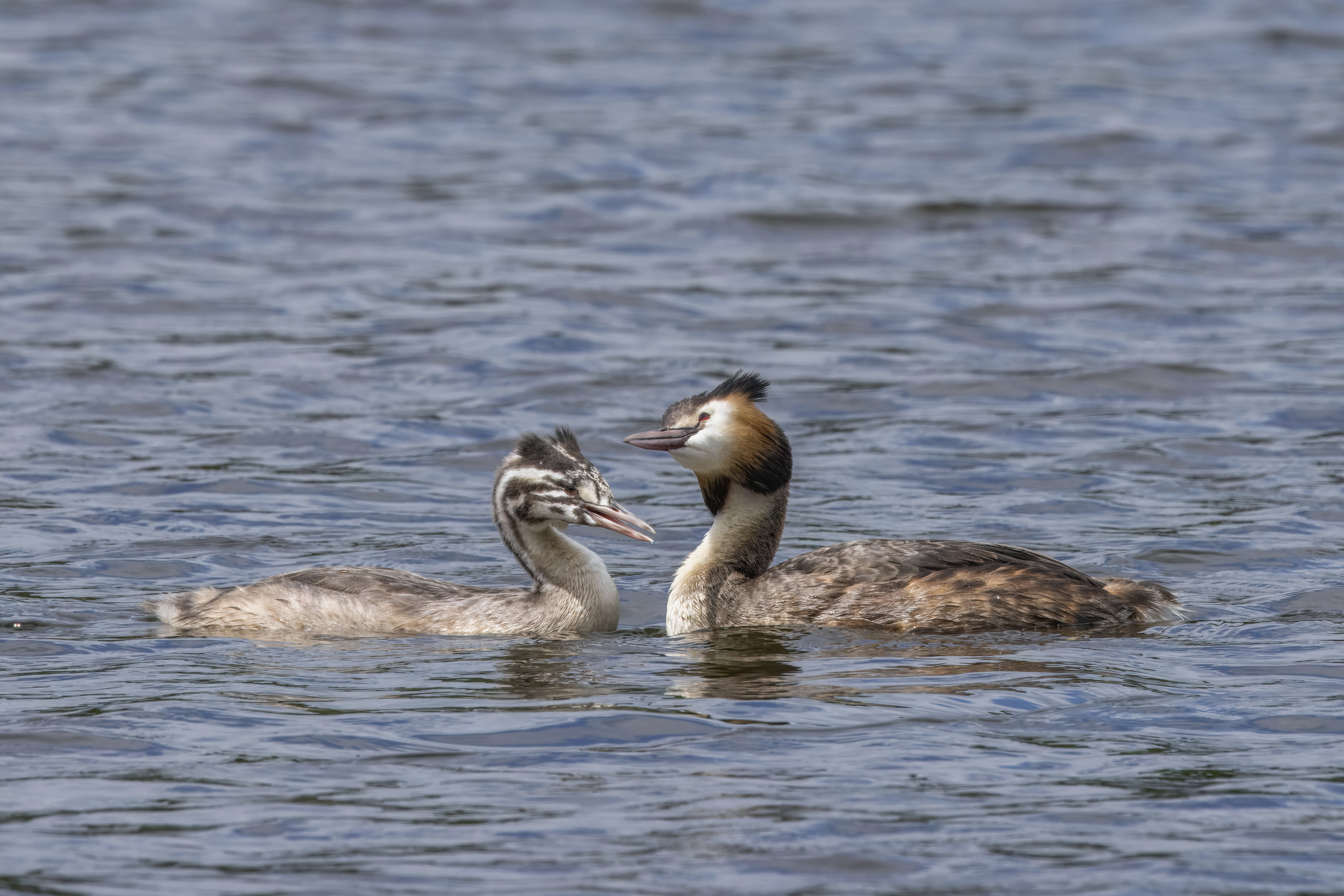
A great crested grebe (Podiceps cristatus) juvenile with adult

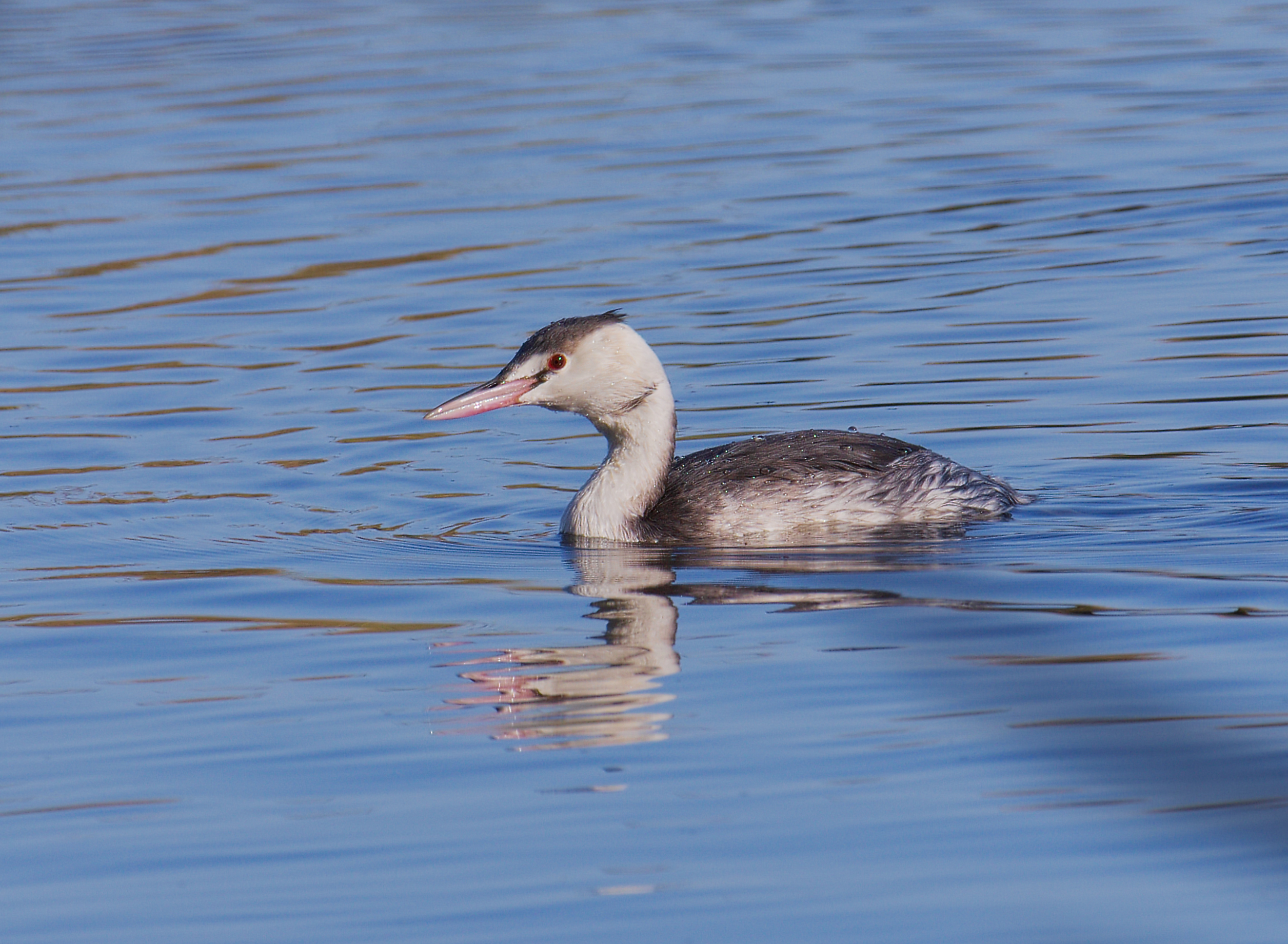
A great crested grebe in non-breeding or winter plumage

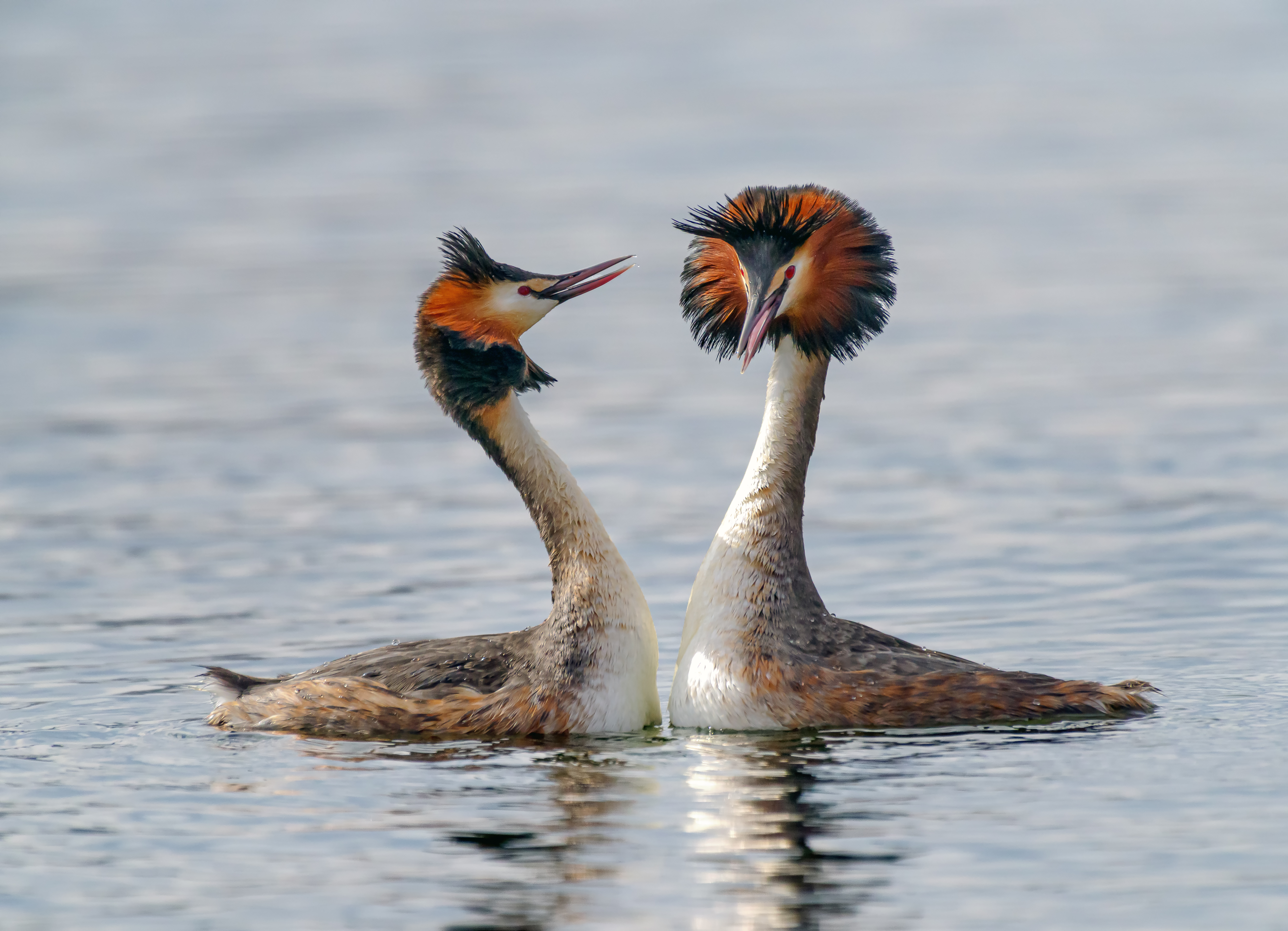
A pair of great crested grebe in breeding plumage as they perform a courtship ritual

== Systematics ==
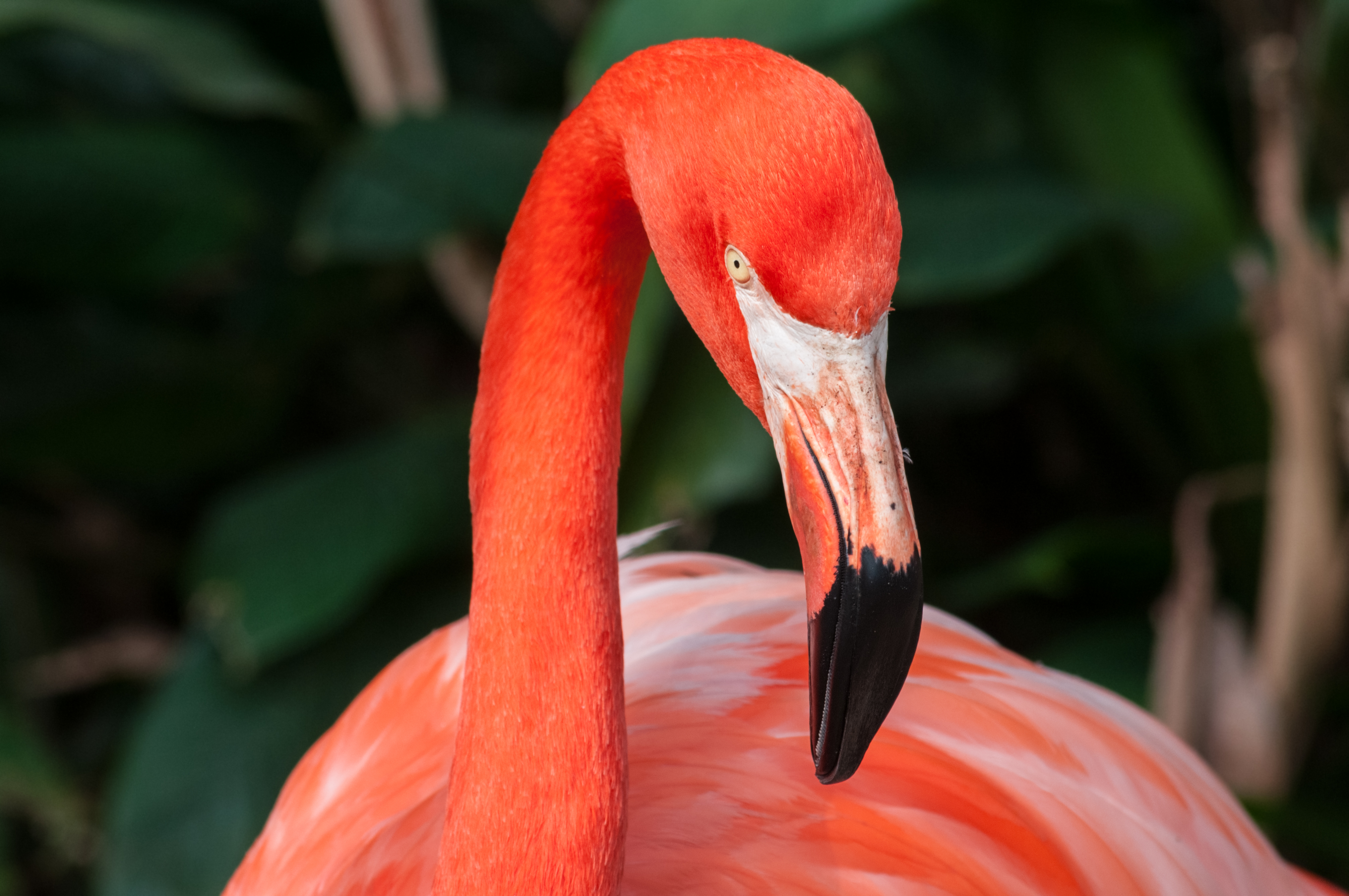
Many molecular and morphological studies support a relationship between grebes and flamingos.

The grebes are a radically distinct group of birds as regards their anatomy. Accordingly, they were at first believed to be related to the loons, which are also foot-propelled diving birds, and both families were once classified together under the order Colymbiformes. However, as early as the 1930s, this was determined to be an example of convergent evolution caused by the strong selective forces encountered by unrelated birds sharing the same lifestyle at different times and in various habitats. Grebes and loons are now separately classified orders of Podicipediformes and Gaviiformes, respectively.

One of the first incidents of the molecular placement of grebes among birds comes from Charles Sibley and Jon E. Ahlquist, who conducted DNA–DNA hybridization studies in the late 1970s and throughout the 1980s. They found the family to occupy a basal position in a clade that also includes the totipalmates (eg., tropicbirds, suliforms, and pelicans), wading birds (ibises, herons, flamingos, and storks), New World vultures, loons, penguins, and tubenosed seabirds. Subsequent molecular studies have not supported this arrangement, however. These subsequent molecular studies instead have suggested a relation with flamingos, a finding that has been backed up by morphological evidence. They hold at least eleven morphological traits in common that are not found in other birds. For example, both flamingos and grebes lay eggs coated with chalky amorphous calcium phosphate. Many of these characteristics have been previously identified in flamingos, but not in grebes. For the grebe-flamingo clade, the taxon Mirandornithes ("miraculous birds" due to their extreme divergence and apomorphies) has been proposed. Alternatively, they could be placed in one order, with Phoenocopteriformes taking priority.

=== Fossil record ===
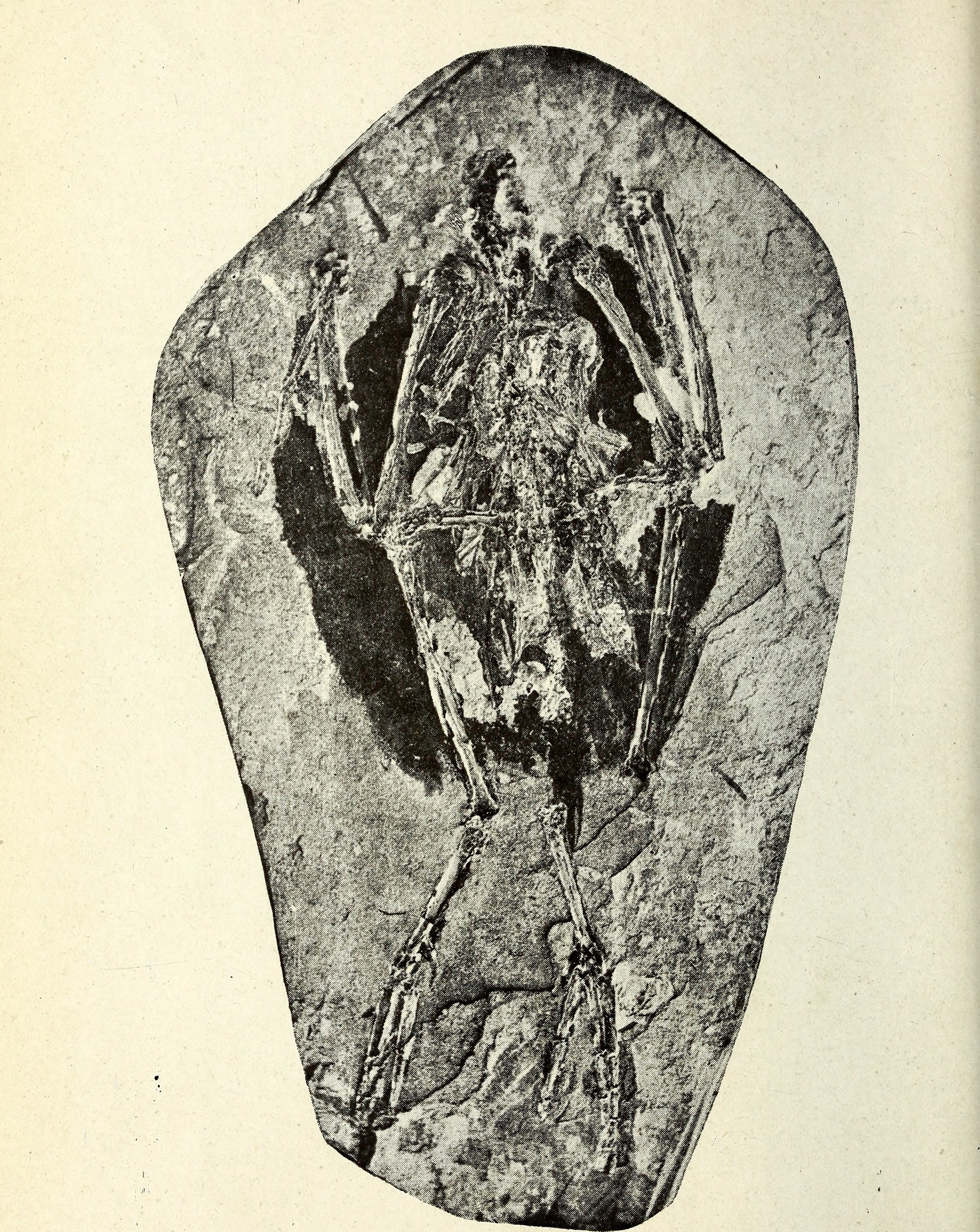
Reconstructed skeleton of fossil slab of Thiornis sociata, an early grebe

The fossil record of grebes is incomplete, as there are no transitional forms between more conventional birds and grebes known from fossils. The enigmatic waterbird genus Juncitarsus, however, may be close to a common ancestor of flamingos and grebes. The extinct stem-flamingo family Palaelodidae has been suggested to be the transitional linkage between the filter-feeding flamingos and the foot-propelled diving grebes. The evidence for this comes from the overall similarity between the foot and limb structure of grebes and palaeloids, suggesting the latter family of waterbirds was able to swim and dive better than flamingos. Some early grebes share similar characteristics to the coracoid and humerus seen in palaeloids.

True grebes suddenly appear in the fossil record in the Late Oligocene or Early Miocene, around 23–25 mya. There are a few prehistoric genera that are now completely extinct. Thiornis and Pliolymbus date from a time when most if not all extant genera were already present. Because grebes are evolutionarily isolated and they only started to appear in the Northern Hemisphere fossil record in the Early Miocene, they are likely to have originated in the Southern Hemisphere.

- Genus Aechmophorus Coues, 1862
  - †Aechmophorus elasson Murray, 1967 (Piacenzian stage of western United States)
- Genus †Hunucornis Agnolín et al., 2025
  - †Hunucornis huayanen Agnolín et al., 2025 (Messinian stage of central Argentina)
- Genus †Miobaptus Švec, 1982
  - †Miobaptus huzhiricus Zelenkov, 2015 (Burdigalian to the Langhian ages of East Siberia)
  - †Miobaptus walteri Švec, 1982 [Podiceps walteri (Švec, 1984) Mlíkovský, 2000] (Aquitanian age of Europe)
- Genus †Miodytes Dimitreijevich, Gál & Kessler, 2002
  - †Miodytes serbicus Dimitreijevich, Gál & Kessler, 2002 (Langhian age of Serbia)
- Genus †Pliolymbus Murray, 1967 [Piliolymbus (sic)]
  - †Pliolymbus baryosteus Murray, 1967 (Piacenzian to the Gelasian stages of western United States and Mexico)
- Genus Podiceps Latham 1787
  - †Podiceps arndti Chandler, 1990 (Piacenzian stage of North America)
  - †Podiceps csarnotanus Kessler, 2009 (Piacenzian stage of Europe)
  - †Podiceps discors Murray, 1967 (Piacenzian stage of North America)
  - †Podiceps dixi Brodkorp, 1963 (Chibanian to the Tarantian stages of Florida, United States)
  - †Podiceps howardae Storer, 2001 (Zanclean age of North Carolina, United States)
  - †Podiceps miocenicus Kessler, 1984 (Tortonian age of Moldova)
  - †Podiceps oligoceanus (Shufeldt, 1915) (Aquitanian age of North America)
  - †Podiceps parvus (Shufeldt, 1913) (Gelasian to the Calabrian stages of North America)
  - †Podiceps pisanus (Portis, 1888) (Piacenzian stage of Italy)
  - †Podiceps solidus Kuročkin, 1985 (Zanclean age of Western Mongolia)
  - †Podiceps subparvus (Miller & Bowman, 1958)
- Genus Podilymbus Lesson 1831
  - †Podilymbus majusculus Murray 1967 (Piacenzian stage of Idaho, United States)
  - †Podilymbus wetmorei Storer 1976 (Chibanian to the Tarantian stages of Florida, United States)
- Genus †Thiornis Navás, 1922
  - †Thiornis sociata Navás, 1922 [Podiceps sociatus (Navás, 1922) Olson, 1995] (Tortonian age of Spain)

A few more recent grebe fossils could not be assigned to modern or prehistoric genera:

- Podicipedidae gen. et sp. indet. (San Diego Late Pliocene of California) – formerly included in Podiceps parvus
- Podicipedidae gen. et sp. indet. UMMP 49592, 52261, 51848, 52276, KUVP 4484 (Late Pliocene of WC USA)
- Podicipedidae gen. et sp. indet. (Glenns Ferry Late Pliocene/Early Pleistocene of Idaho, US)
- Podicipedidae gen. et sp. indet. UMMP 74784 (Middle Miocene of Nevada)

=== Phylogeny ===
To date, there is no complete phylogeny of grebes based on molecular work. However, there are comprehensive morphological works from Bochenski (1994), Fjeldså (2004) and Ksepka et al. (2013) that have been done on the grebe genera.

Bochenski (1994)

- Podicipedidae
  - - Podilymbus
    - - Poliocephalus
      - - Tachybaptus dominicus
        - - Tachybaptus novaehollandiae
          - - Tachybaptus ruficollis
            - Rollandia
  - - Podiceps
    - - Podicephorus
      - Aechmophorus

Fjeldså (2004)

- Podicipedidae
  - Rollandia
  - - - Tachybaptus
      - Podilymbus
    - - Poliocephalus
      - - Podicephorus
        - Aechmophorus
        - Podiceps

Ksepka et al. (2013)

- Podicipedidae
  - - Dominicus
    - - Tachybaptus
      - Poliocephalus
  - - - Rollandia
      - Podilymbus
    - - - - Podiceps nigricollis
          - Podiceps occipitalis
        - - Podiceps auritus
          - - - Podiceps cristatus
              - Podiceps grisegena
            - - Podiceps major
              - Aechmophorus

=== Recent species listing ===
Image	Genus	Living and recently extinct species
	Podilymbus Lesson 1831	Pied-billed grebe Podilymbus podiceps (Linnaeus 1758); P. p. podiceps (Linnaeus 1758) (northern pied-billed grebe); P. p. antarcticus (Lesson 1842) (southern pied-billed grebe); P. p. antillarum Bangs 1913 (Antillean pied-billed grebe); †Atitlán grebe Podilymbus gigas Griscom 1929 (extinct 1989)
	Tachybaptus Reichenbach 1853	Least grebe Tachybaptus dominicus (Linnaeus 1766); T. d. dominicus (Linnaeus 1766) (West Indian grebe); T. d. bangsi (van Rossem & Hachisuka 1937) (Bangs's grebe); T. d. brachypterus (Chapman 1899) (Mexican least grebe); T. d. brachyrhynchus (Chapman 1899) (short-billed grebe); T. d. eisenmanni Storer & Getty 1985; Little grebe Tachybaptus ruficollis (Pallas 1764); T. r. ruficollis (Pallas 1764) (European little grebe); T. r. albescens (Blanford 1877) (Indian little grebe); T. r. capensis (Salvadori 1884) (African little grebe); T. r. cotabato (Rand 1948) (Mindanao little grebe); T. r. iraquensis (Ticehurst 1923) (Iraq little grebe); T. r. poggei (Reichenow 1902); T. r. philippensis (Bonnaterre 1790) (Philippine little grebe); Australasian grebe Tachybaptus novaehollandiae (Stephens 1826); T. n. novaehollandiae (Stephens 1826) (Australian little grebe); T. n. fumosus (Mayr 1943); T. n. incola (Mayr 1943); T. n. javanicus (Mayr 1943); T. n. leucosternos (Mayr 1931); T. n. rennellianus (Mayr 1943); Madagascar grebe Tachybaptus pelzelnii (Hartlaub 1861); Tricolored grebe Tachybaptus tricolor (Gray 1861); T. t. tricolor (Gray 1861); T. t. collaris (Mayr 1945); T. t. vulcanorum (Rensch 1929); †Alaotra grebe Tachybaptus rufolavatus (Delacour 1932) (extinct 2010)
	Poliocephalus Selby, 1840	Hoary-headed grebe Poliocephalus poliocephalus (Jardine & Selby 1827); New Zealand grebe Poliocephalus rufopectus (Gray 1843)
	Aechmophorus Coues, 1862	Western grebe Aechmophorus occidentalis (Lawrence 1858); A. o. occidentalis (Lawrence 1858); A. o. ephemeralis Dickerman 1986; Clark's grebe Aechmophorus clarkii (Lawrence 1858); A. c. clarkii (Lawrence 1858); A. c. transitionalis Dickerman 1986
	Podiceps Latham 1787	Horned grebe or Slavonian grebe, Podiceps auritus (Linnaeus 1758); P. a. auritus (Linnaeus 1758) (Slavonian grebe); P. a. cornutus (Gmelin 1789) (horned grebe); Great crested grebe Podiceps cristatus (Linnaeus 1758); P. c. cristatus (Linnaeus 1758) (Eurasian great crested grebe); P. c. australis Gould 1844 (Australasian great crested grebe); P. c. infuscatus Salvadori 1884 (African great crested grebe); Hooded grebe Podiceps gallardoi Rumboll 1974; Red-necked grebe Podiceps grisegena (Boddaert 1783); P. g. grisegena (Boddaert 1783) (European red-necked grebe); P. g. holbollii Reinhardt 1853 (Holbøll's grebe); Great grebe Podiceps major (Boddaert 1783) Bochenski 1994; P. m. major (Boddaert 1783); P. m. navasi Manghi 1984; Black-necked grebe or eared grebe Podiceps nigricollis Brehm 1831; P. n. nigricollis Brehm 1831 (Eurasian black-necked grebe); P. n. gurneyi (Roberts 1919) (African black-necked grebe); P. n. californicus (Heermann, 1854) (eared grebe); Silvery grebe Podiceps occipitalis Garnot 1826; P. o. occipitalis Garnot 1826 (southern silvery grebe); P. o. juninensis von Berlepsch & Stolzmann 1894 (northern silvery grebe); Junín grebe Podiceps taczanowskii von Berlepsch & Stolzmann 1894; †Colombian grebe Podiceps andinus (Meyer de Schauensee 1959) (extinct 1977)
	Rollandia Bonaparte, 1856	Titicaca grebe Rollandia microptera Gould 1868; White-tufted grebe Rollandia rolland Quoy & Gaimard 1824; R. r. rolland Quoy & Gaimard 1824 (Falkland white-tufted grebe); R. r. chilensis Lesson 1828 (Chilean white-tufted grebe); R. r. morrisoni Simmons 1962 (Junín white-tufted grebe)

== Natural history ==
=== Habitat, distribution and migration ===
Grebes are a nearly cosmopolitan clade of waterbirds, found on every continent except Antarctica. They are absent from the Arctic Circle and arid environments. They have successfully colonized islands such as Madagascar and New Zealand. Some species, such as the eared grebe (Podiceps nigricollis) and great crested grebe (P. cristatus), are found on multiple continents with regional subspecies or populations. A few species like the Junin grebe (P. taczanowskii) and the recently extinct Atitlán grebe (Podilymbus gigas) are lake endemics. During the warmer or breeding seasons, many species of grebes in the northern hemisphere reside in a variety of freshwater habitats like lakes and marshes. Once winter arrives, many will migrate to marine environments along the coastlines. During migration, grebes migrate either by flying overland at night or swimming along the coast during the day. Grebes are most prevalent in the New World, with almost half of the world's species native there.

=== Feeding ecology ===
The feeding ecology of grebes is diverse. Larger species, such as those in the genus Aechmophorus, have spear-like bills to catch mid-depth fish, while smaller species, such as those in the genera Tachybaptus and Podilymbus, tend to be short and stout with a preference for catching small aquatic invertebrates. The majority of grebes prey on aquatic invertebrates, with only a handful of large-bodied piscivores. The aforementioned Aechmophorus is the most piscivorous of the grebes. Closely related species that overlap in their range often avoid interspecific competition by having prey preferences and adaptations for it. In areas where there is just a single species, they tend to have more generalized bills with a greater range of prey sources.

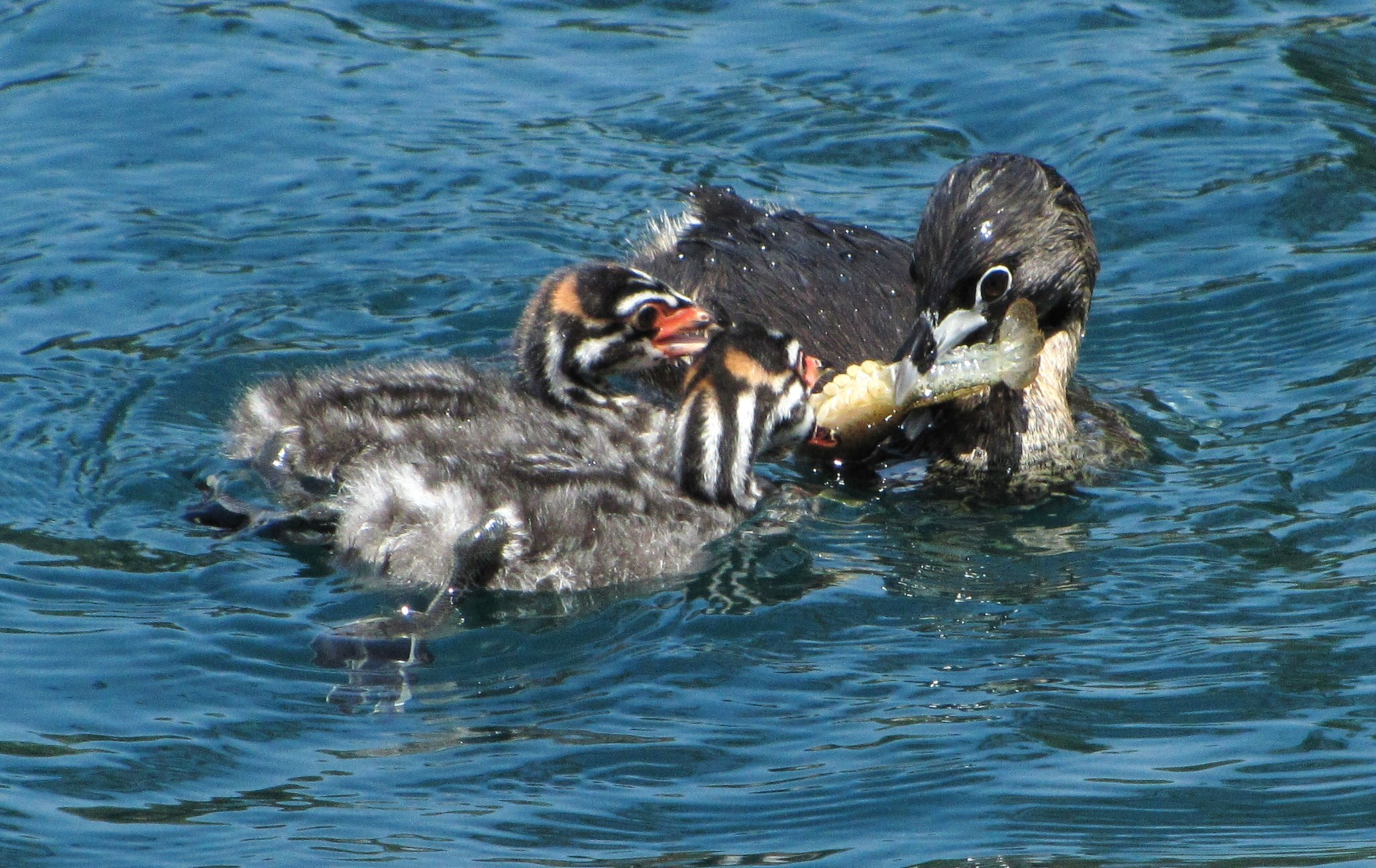
The pied-billed grebe (Podilymbus podiceps) is a small species of grebe that mostly hunts aquatic invertebrates. Here, a parent feeds its chicks a crayfish.

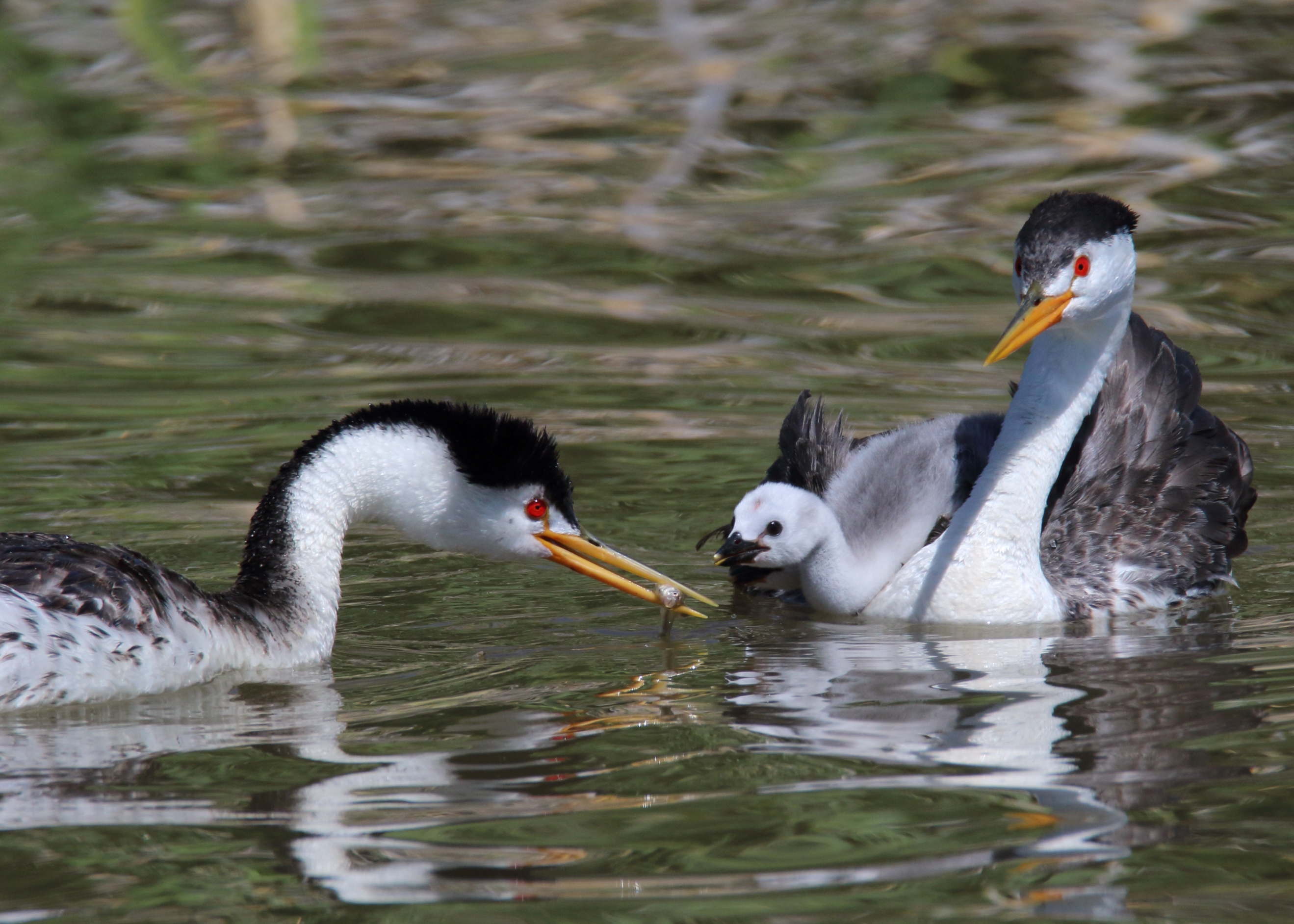
The Clark's grebe (Aechmophorus clarkii) is a large species of grebe that mostly hunts fish. Here, a parent feeds its chick.

=== Breeding and reproduction ===
Grebes are perhaps best known for their elaborate courtship displays. Most species perform a duet together, and many have their synchronized rituals. Some, like those species in the genus Podiceps, do a "penguin dance" where the male and female stand upright, with their chests puffed out, and run along the water's surface. A similar ritual in other species is the "weed dance", in which both partners hold pieces of aquatic vegetation in their bills and are positioned upright towards each other. There is also the "weed rush", in which partners swim towards each other, necks stretched out with weeds in their bills, and just before colliding, position themselves upright and then swim in parallel.

In the smaller and basal genera like Tachybaptus and Podilymbus, there is incorporation of aquatic vegetation in their courtship. Still, it is not as elaborate as the more derived and larger species. It has been hypothesized that such courtship displays between mates originated from intraspecific aggression that evolved in a way that strengthened pair bonds. Once these courtship rituals are completed, both partners solicit copulation from each other and mount on floating platforms of vegetation. Females lay two to seven eggs, and incubation can last nearly a month. Chicks of the nest hatch asynchronously. Once the whole nest has hatched, the chicks begin to climb on one of their parents' backs. Both parents take care of rearing their young, and the duration of care is longer than that of other waterfowl. This enables a greater survival rate for the chicks. One parent dives for food, while the other watches the young on the surface.

=== Parasitology ===
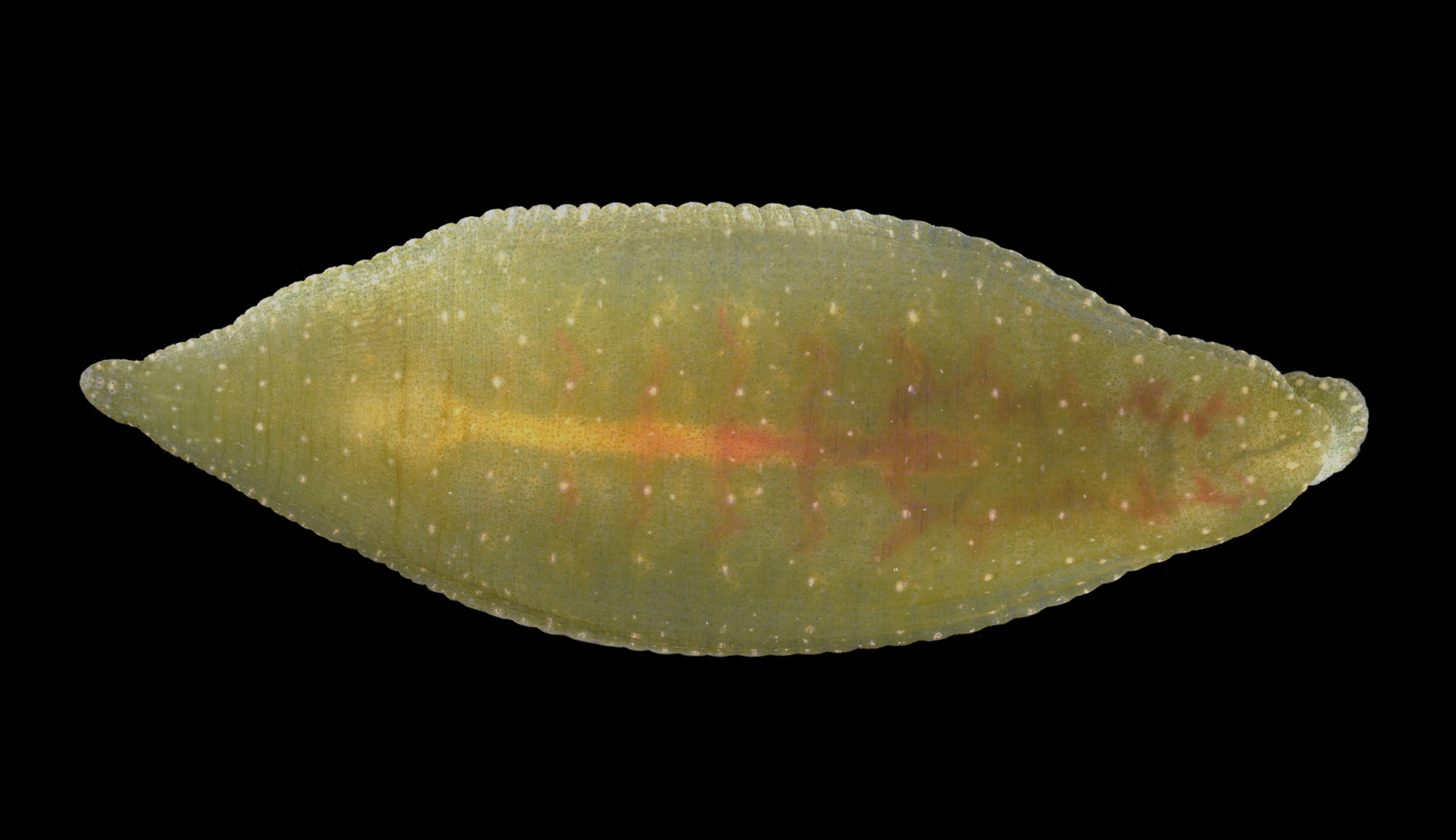
The leech genus Theromyzon is an external parasite that has been found in the nasal cavities of grebes.

Two hundred forty-nine species of parasitic worms have been known to parasitize the intestinal region of grebes. The amabiliids are a family of cyclophyllid cestodes that are almost all grebe specialists. The life cycle of these tapeworms begins when eggs are passed through the feces, where they are picked up by intermediate hosts, which include corixid bugs and the nymphs of Odonata. These aquatic insects are eventually consumed by grebes, where the lifecycle begins again. Another grebe specialist family of internal parasites is the Dioecocestidae. Other families, such as Echinostomatidae and Hymenolepididae, also contain several cestode species that are grebe specialists.

The prominent external parasites of grebes are the lice of the clade Ischnocera. One genus of these lice, Aquanirmus, is the only one that is a grebe specialist. Another major group of parasites is the two mites of the families Rhinonyssidae and Ereynetidae; these infect the nasal passages of grebes. The rhinonyssids move slowly in the mucous membranes, drinking blood, while the ereynetids live on the surface. Various lineages of feather mites of the clade Analgoidea have evolved to occupy different sections of the feather. Theromyzon ("duck leeches") tend to feed in the nasal cavities of waterbirds in general, including grebes.

== Conservation ==
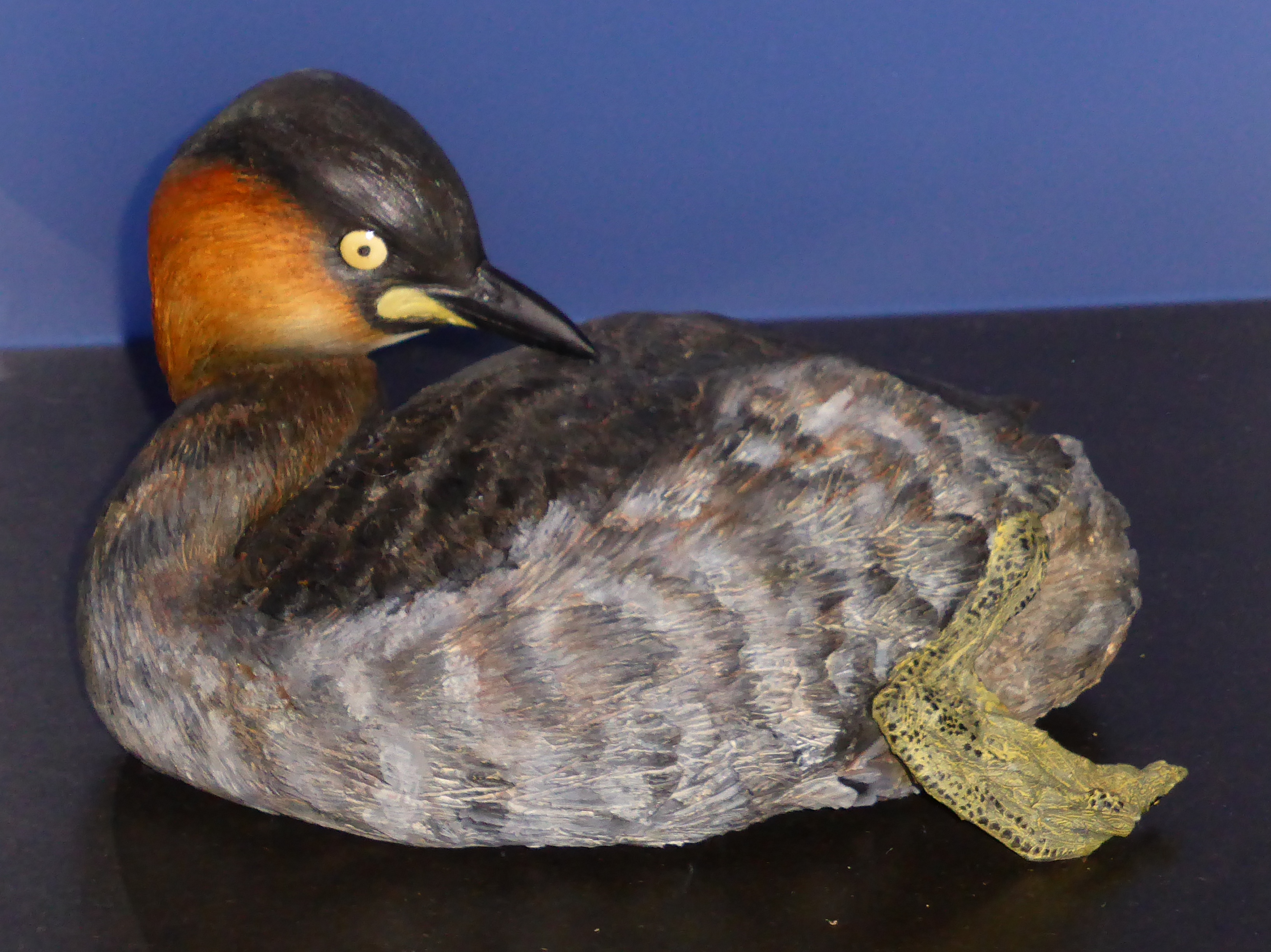
Alaotra grebe (T. rufolavatus) was one of the three species of lake endemic grebes that have gone extinct.

Thirty percent of the total extant species are considered threatened by the IUCN. The handful of critically endangered and extinct species of grebe are lake endemics, and nearly all of them are or were flightless. The three recently extinct species consist of the Alaotra grebe, the Atitlán grebe, and the Colombian grebe. These species went extinct due to anthropogenic changes, such as habitat loss, the introduction of invasive predatory fishes, and the use of fishing nets that tangled birds in the lakes where they once existed. Similar issues are befalling the Colombian grebe's closest relatives, the Junin grebe and hooded grebe, along with climate change.

== See also ==
- List of Podicipediformes by population
