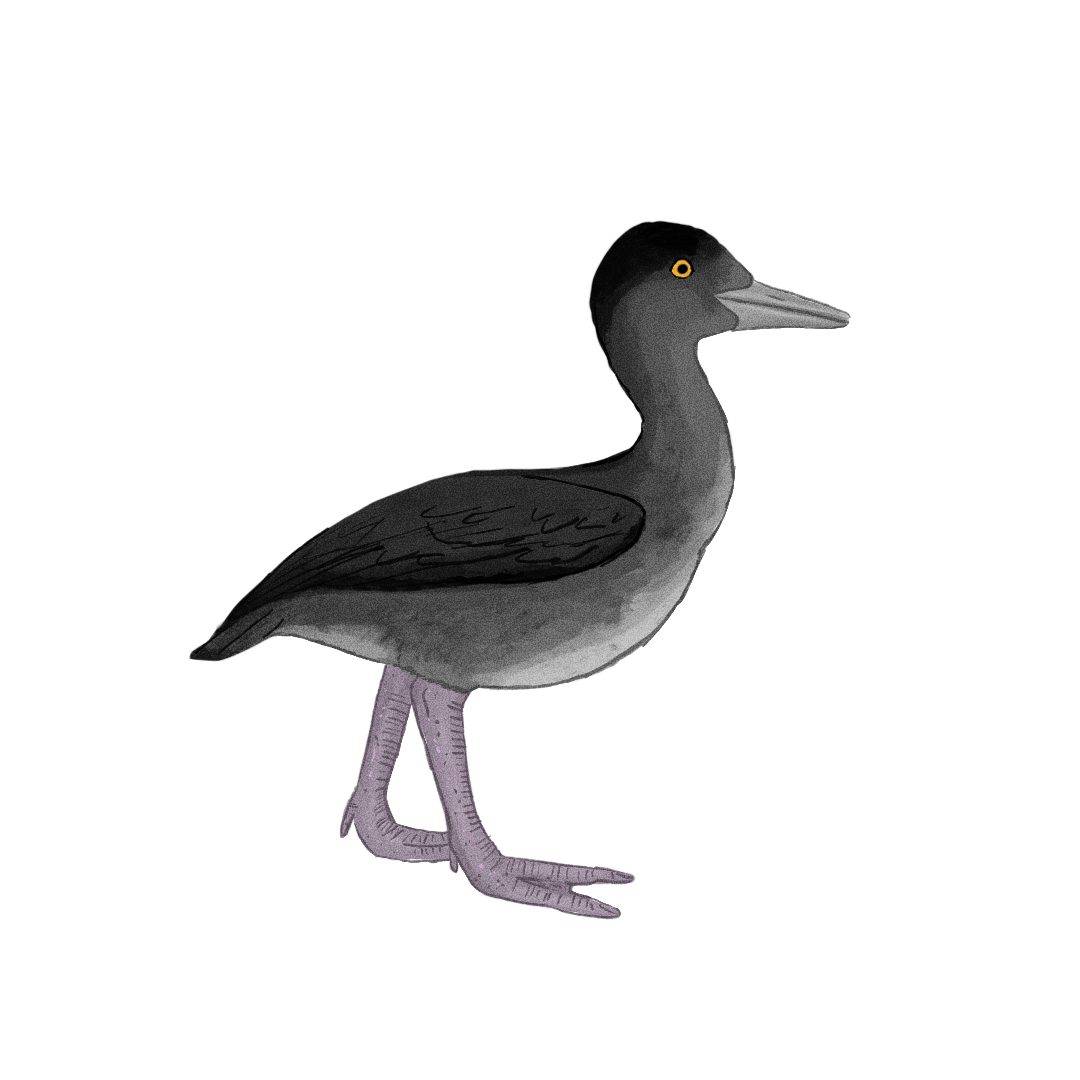
- Life restoration of Miobaptus

Scientific classification
- Domain: Eukaryota
- Kingdom: Animalia
- Phylum: Chordata
- Class: Aves
- Order: Podicipediformes
- Family: Podicipedidae
- Genus: †Miobaptus; Švec, 1982

Type species
- †Miobaptus walteri Švec, 1982

Other species
- †M. huzhiricus Zelenkov, 2015

= Miobaptus =

Miobaptus Temporal range: Early Miocene–Middle Miocene

Extinct water bird

Miobaptus is a fossil genus of grebe that is known from several specimens collected from Czechia and Lake Baikal dating from the Early Miocene to Middle Miocene. Considered to be one of the most primitive genera of grebes, the anatomy of Miobaptus suggests it was less adapted for the aquatic mode of life than modern grebes, but had better flight maneuverability.

== History ==
The holotype species M. walteri was collected from Dolnice and described by Švec (1982). He would later describe more specimens of the species from Bohemia in 1984. A second species M. huzhiricus was described by Zelenkov (2015) from specimens collected from Olkhon Island.

== Description ==
The distal part in the humeri of Miobaptus is different from extant grebes as the surface is flat and overall the wingbones more elongated. In contrast the distal ends in the humeri of extant grebes the surfaces is more concave, and overall they have much shorter wingbones.

== Classification ==
Miobaptus is placed basally in the phylogenetic tree of grebes where similarities have been made between this genus and Palaelodidae. The palaelodids is an extinct family of Phoenicopteriformes where they have been suggested to be the transitional form between flamingos and grebes. Both Miobaptus and the palaelodids share several features in the humerus and coracoid. Therefore while Miobaptus is similar to Tachybaptus there are some differences and any similarity between the two is likely due to plesiomorphic features.

== Paleobiology ==
M. walteri is known from the Aquitanian stage of the Miocene while M. huzhiricus is from the boundary line between the Burdigalian and Langhian stages. The presence of this genus in both Europe and Asia at this time is significant as it shows at this time grebes were already spreading across the globe, as well as how the avifaunas were being established to their present in Eurasia. Based on their anatomy it shows that Miobaptus was much better capable at flying than modern grebes (though it was not as specialized in being aquatic).
