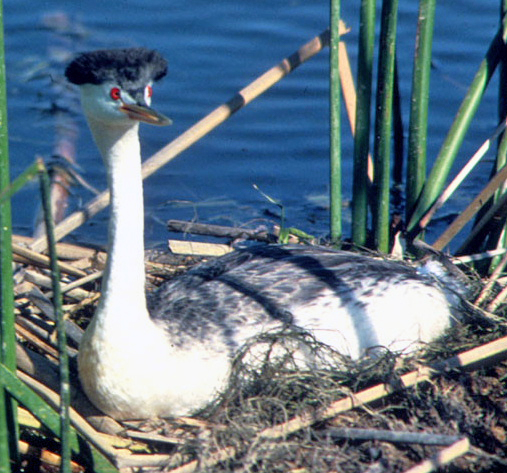
- Clark's grebe

Scientific classification
- Kingdom: Animalia
- Phylum: Chordata
- Class: Aves
- Order: Podicipediformes
- Family: Podicipedidae
- Tribe: Podicipedini
- Genus: Aechmophorus; Coues, 1862

Type species
- Podiceps occidentalis Lawrence, 1858

Species
- †Aechmophorus elasson; Aechmophorus clarkii; Aechmophorus occidentalis

= Aechmophorus =

Aechmophorus Temporal range: Late Pliocene to present

Genus of birds

Aechmophorus is a genus of birds in the grebe family.

== Species ==
It has two living representatives breeding in western North America.

Genus Aechmophorus – Coues, 1862 – two species
| Common name | Scientific name and subspecies | Range | Size and ecology | IUCN status and estimated population |
|---|---|---|---|---|
| Western grebe | Aechmophorus occidentalis (Lawrence, 1858) Four subspecies: A. occidentalis ssp. occidentalis, (Lawrence, 1858); A. occidentalis ssp. ephemeralis, Dickerman, 1986; A. clarkii ssp. clarkii, (Lawrence, 1858); A. clarkii ssp. transitionalis, Dickerman, 1986 | western Canada & United States and Mexico | Size: 55–75 cm (22–30 in) long, weighs 795–2,000 g (1.753–4.409 lb), with a wingspan of79–102 cm (31–40 in). Habitat: Diet: carp, herring, mollusks, crabs, and amphibians, such as salamanders. | LC |
| Clark's grebe | Aechmophorus clarkii (Lawrence, 1858) | California, Nevada, and Arizona and central Mexico | Size: 22–29 inches (56–74 cm), weighs 25.3–44.4 oz (720–1,260 g), with a wingspan of 24 inches (61 cm) Habitat: Diet: salamanders, crustaceans, polychaete worms and insects | LC |

One prehistoric species has been described from fossil remains:

- Aechmophorus elasson (Late Pliocene of W USA)

Although the two living species look very similar, bill shape and coloration, as well as feathering around the scarlet eye of the bird can be used to determine the precise species.

== Distinguishing features ==
The western grebe has a straight bill with a dull green-yellow color as opposed to the Clark's grebe, which has a slightly upturned, bright orange-yellow bill. In both species the male has a longer and deeper bill than that of the female, making it a distinguishing feature. All species of grebes display the pattern of lobed feet. A tough skin surrounds each toe separately, providing more surface area for effective swimming. This form increases the power of propulsion per stroke and reduces drag when the bird is recovering. Skeletal measurements taken from both species, when averaged together, revealed that for the most part the western grebe is larger than the Clark's grebe. The two species also differ in their advertising calls. The western grebe gives a call that includes two distinct "cree-cree" notes, while the Clark's grebe consists of a single "creeet" note, more drawn out.

== Distribution and habits ==
Western North America is home for nearly all individuals of both species of grebes. When migration occurs, the birds in the northern range will travel west in flocks, at night to the Pacific coast. Both western and Clark's grebes winter in sheltered bays or estuaries on the Pacific coast and summer in freshwater lakes with marshy vegetation as well as large open areas of water. The site of nesting is usually in a shallow water marsh. Both males and females help to build a floating platform nest of vegetation (Kaufman 1996). Because of the colonial nature of these birds nests must be continually guarded during the breeding season. If left unattended other pairs of birds seeking nest sites will seize the platform.

These two species, like most grebes, eat a diet consisting mostly of fish. They are also known to forage on crustaceans, insects, worms and salamanders. Foraging techniques are composed of a number of foot-propelled dives. Current research is associating the use of springing dives by the Clark's grebe, in which the bird essentially leaps from the water before submerging, allowing it to reach deeper below the surface, with possibly proving niche separation between the two species.

== Reproduction ==
Western and Clark's grebes take part in a courtship display known as mate feeding. This occurs regularly between a mated pair during the period prior to hatching of nestlings. In both species mate feeding appears to peak shortly before egg laying and involves the male providing large quantities of food to the begging female. Pairs will also engage in a spectacular display, by rearing up and "rushing" across the surface of the water side by side, making a loud pattering sound with their feet. This display is not only done by mated pairs, but can also be done by two males competing for a female as well as the female along with the two males. Therefore, it has been suggested that the "rushing" ceremony is done for more than one purpose.

The typical clutch size for both Western and Clark's grebes is between 2 and 4 eggs per season. They are usually a pale bluish white and become stained by the nest to a speckled brown. Downy young of the western grebe display a uniform gray along the back, a white belly along with a dark patch on the forehead. This differs in Clark's grebe where the young are almost entirely white. Both species of nestlings have an area of skin on the crown that changes color from orange to scarlet if the chick needs feeding or is in distress. Males tend to hunt and provide chicks with food more often than females, however only one fish can be caught during each dive. Fledging occurs just hours after the last nestling emerges from its shell. The semialtricial nestlings travel on the backs of their parents for several weeks, this is referred to as back brooding and both parents participate in the activity. For the first two weeks after hatching chicks are completely camouflaged by their parents back feathers and will progressively become more visible. Chicks will stay close to their parents when predators are spotted or during feedings.
