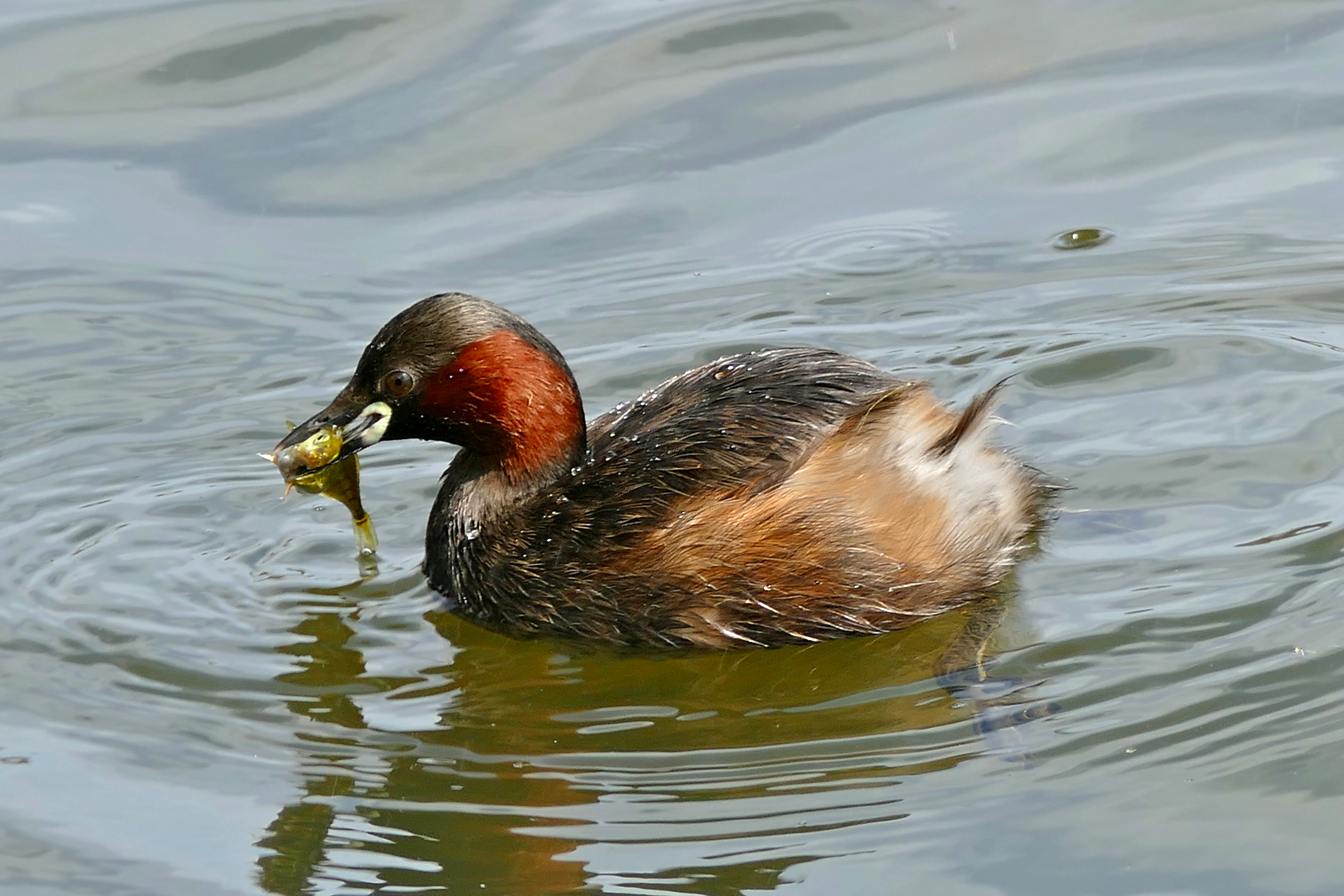
- Tachybaptus ruficollis near Castelló d'Empúries, Catalonia, Spain.

Scientific classification
- Kingdom: Animalia
- Phylum: Chordata
- Class: Aves
- Order: Podicipediformes
- Family: Podicipedidae
- Tribe: Podilymbini
- Genus: Tachybaptus; Reichenbach, 1853

Type species
- Colymbus minor, Gmelin, 1789=Colymbus ruficollis Pallas, 1764

Species
- See text

Synonyms
- Poliocephalus Reichenbach 1853; Sylbeocyclus Macgillivray 1842 non Bonaparte 1831; Limnodytes Oberholser 1974

= Tachybaptus =

Genus of birds

Tachybaptus is a genus of small birds of the grebe family. The genus name means "quick diving"; it is from Ancient Greek takhys "quick" and bapto "I dip". It has representatives over much of the world, including the tropics.

These grebes breed in small colonies in heavily vegetated areas of freshwater lakes. They may move to more open or coastal waters when not breeding, and birds in those areas where the waters freeze may be migratory. Like all grebes, they nest on the water's edge, since the legs are set very far back and they cannot walk well. The striped young are sometimes carried on the adult's back. These small grebes are excellent swimmers and divers, and pursue their fish prey underwater.

They are dumpy and short-billed birds with a “powder puff” rear end; the sexes are similar. Adults have a distinctive breeding plumage and loud breeding calls. In winter, they are grey and white.

The four Old World species are closely related to each and at least three have interbred. Unlike these, the least grebe lacks chestnut colouring on the neck, and has formerly been placed in at least three other genera.

== Taxonomy ==
The genus Tachybaptus was introduced in 1853 by the German naturalist Ludwig Reichenbach to accommodate a single species, Colymbus minor Gmelin, 1789. This is a junior synonym of Colymbus ruficollis Pallas, 1764, the little grebe. The genus name combines the Ancient Greek ταχυς/takhus meaning "fast" with βαπτω/baptō meaning "to sink under".

The genus contains five species:

Image	Common name	Scientific name	Subspecies	Distribution
	† Alaotra grebe	Tachybaptus rufolavatus	Monotypic	formerly Lake Alaotra, Madagascar; extinct, last reported 1985
	Little grebe	Tachybaptus ruficollis	Ten	Across Europe, much of Asia down to Philippines, New Guinea and Solomon Islands, and most of Africa
	Australasian grebe	Tachybaptus novaehollandiae	Six	Australia, New Zealand and nearby Pacific islands
	Madagascar grebe	Tachybaptus pelzelnii	Monotypic	Madagascar
	Least grebe	Tachybaptus dominicus	Five	Southern United States and Mexico to Argentina; also Trinidad and Tobago, the Bahamas and the Greater Antilles
