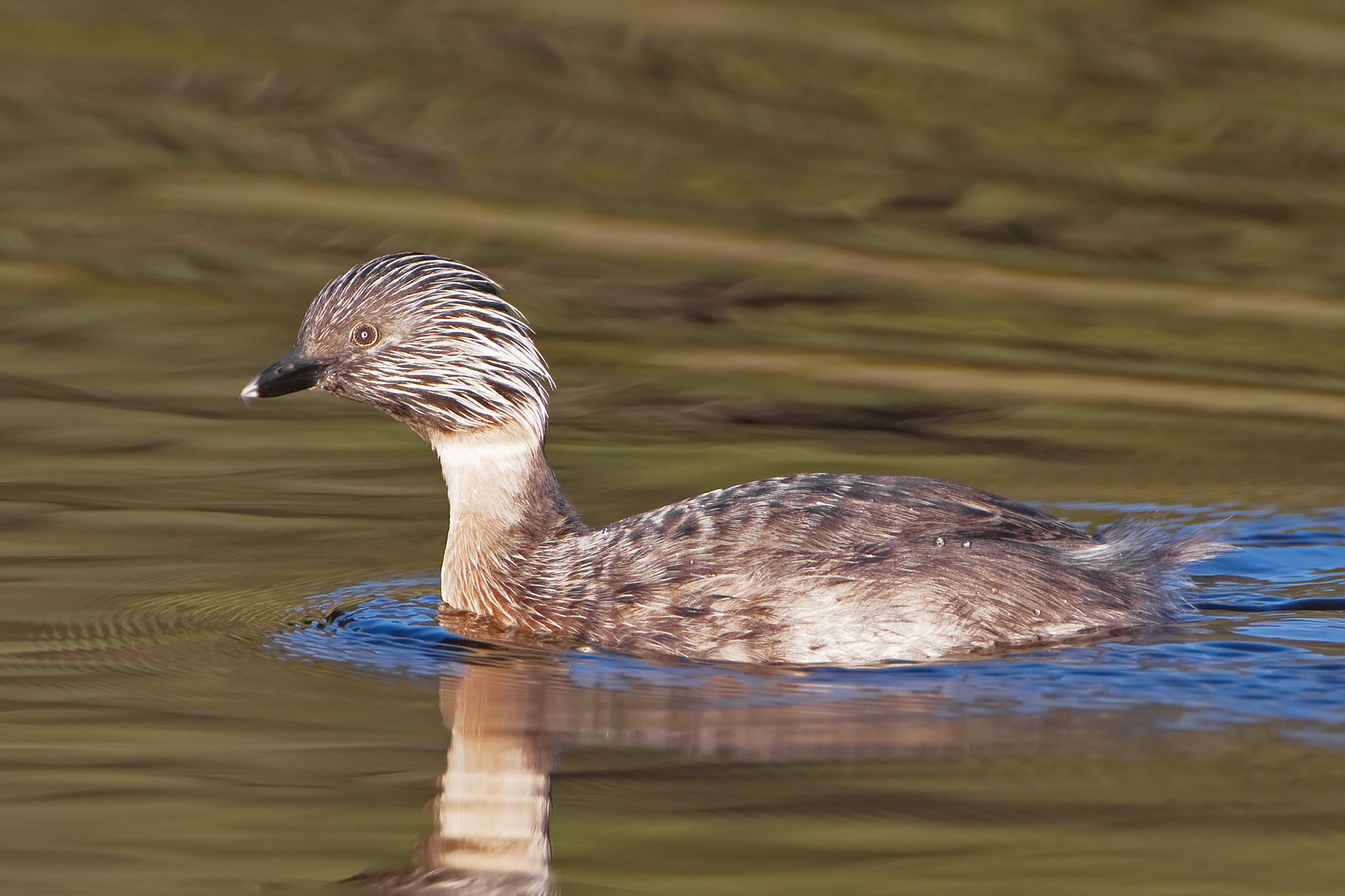
- Hoary-headed grebe, Poliocephalus poliocephalus

Scientific classification
- Kingdom: Animalia
- Phylum: Chordata
- Class: Aves
- Order: Podicipediformes
- Family: Podicipedidae
- Genus: Poliocephalus; Selby, 1840

Type species
- Podiceps nestor Gould, 1836

Species
- P. poliocephalus P. rufopectus

= Poliocephalus (bird) =

Genus of birds

Poliocephalus is a small genus of birds in the grebe family. Its two members are found in Australia and New Zealand.

== Species ==
There are two species in the genus:

Genus Poliocephalus – Selby, 1840 – two species
Common name	Scientific name and subspecies	Range	Size and ecology	IUCN status and estimated population
Hoary-headed grebe	Poliocephalus poliocephalus (Jardine & Selby, 1827)	Australia and Tasmania	Size: Habitat: Diet:	LC
New Zealand grebe	Poliocephalus rufopectus (Gray, 1843)	New Zealand.	Size: Habitat: Diet:	LC
