= Joyeuxilepis fuhrmanni =

Scientific classification
- Kingdom: Animalia
- Phylum: Platyhelminthes
- Class: Cestoda
- Order: Cyclophyllidea
- Family: Amabiliidae
- Genus: Joyeuxilepis
- Species: J. fuhrmanni

Binomial name
- Joyeuxilepis fuhrmanni (Solomon, 1932) Borgarenko & Gulyaev, 1990

Species of flatworm

Joyeuxilepis fuhrmanni is a species of tapeworm in the family Amabiliidae.

It was originally described as Tatria fuhrmanni by Solomon in 1932 but was transferred to its current genus in 2003. It is only known from one occurrence, an infected bird, probably a grebe, in Kenya.
