= Podiceps oligoceanus =

Podiceps oligoceanus Temporal range: Early Miocene

Scientific classification
- Kingdom: Animalia
- Phylum: Chordata
- Class: Aves
- Order: Podicipediformes
- Family: Podicipedidae
- Genus: Podiceps
- Species: †P. oligoceanus

Binomial name
- †Podiceps oligoceanus (Shufeldt, 1915)

Synonyms
- Colymbus oligoceanus Shufeldt, 1915

Extinct species of grebe

Podiceps oligoceanus is an extinct species of grebe possibly from the Neogene period which the specimen has been found in the United States.

== History ==
The species was part of a major paper that was commissioned by professor Charles Schuchert in 1914 in which he had Robert Wilson Shufeldt for revision of the type specimens of fossil birds that were described by Othniel Charles Marsh for the Peabody Museum of Natural History.

== Description ==
The femur of the holotype (YPM 983) is similar to grebes of the genus Aechmophorus and the red-necked grebe (P. grisegena), though the shaft is slender and heavier.

== Classification ==
Initially the species was placed in the now defunct genus Colymbus by Shufeldt (1915) (Colymbus oligoceanus), it has since been reclassified into the genus Podiceps.

== Paleobiology ==
The holotype femur was found at the John Day Fossil Beds National Monument. The age of P. oligoceanus is uncertain. Shufeldt (1915) tentatively assign the species of Oligocene age, while Brodkorb (1963) believed the species is of Early Miocene age. There are doubts, however, that P. oligoceanus could also be from the Pleistocene epoch due to how similar it is to modern grebes.
