= Podiceps arndti =

Podiceps arndti Temporal range: Piacenzian

Scientific classification
- Domain: Eukaryota
- Kingdom: Animalia
- Phylum: Chordata
- Class: Aves
- Order: Podicipediformes
- Family: Podicipedidae
- Genus: Podiceps
- Species: †P. arndti

Binomial name
- †Podiceps arndti Chandler, 1990

Extinct species of grebe

Podiceps arndti is an extinct species of grebe from the Upper Pliocene of California.

== History ==
The species was described in a monograph on fossil birds of the San Diego Formation from Robert M. Chandler in 1990. The species name "arndti" is in honor of Joseph Arndt for his contributions for the Natural History Museum of Los Angeles County with collecting fossils from the San Diego Formation.

== Description ==
Specimens of Podiceps arndti consisted of several associated femura, tibiotarsi and tarsometatarsi. The species can be differentiated from other species of Podiceps in which the trochanteric ridge of the femur separated from the trochanter. The depression inside of the trochanteric ridge is more distal to the iliac surface than beside the ridge as well. The species is smaller than the red-necked grebe (P. grisegena), though it was larger than other species of contemporary grebes with only the later P. parvus being of similar size.

== Paleobiology ==
P. arndti comes from the Piacenzian aged aforementioned San Diego Formation.
