= Tatria azerbaijanica =

Scientific classification
- Kingdom: Animalia
- Phylum: Platyhelminthes
- Class: Cestoda
- Order: Cyclophyllidea
- Family: Amabiliidae
- Genus: Tatria
- Species: T. azerbaijanica

Binomial name
- Tatria azerbaijanica Matevosyan & Sailov 1963

Species of Cestoda

Tatria azerbaijanica is a species of tapeworm in the family Amabiliidae. It was discovered in Azerbaijan from where it gets its name. It infects the great crested grebe and the little grebe.

It resembles Tatria acanthorhyncha, Tatria decacantha and Tatria skrjabini but differs from the in a number of characteristics, including having only 8 rows of spines beneath the rostellar hooks, in the shape and length of its hooks, and it has a spined cirrus and unarmed sucker.
