= Tatria biremis =

Scientific classification
- Kingdom: Animalia
- Phylum: Platyhelminthes
- Class: Cestoda
- Order: Cyclophyllidea
- Family: Amabiliidae
- Genus: Tatria
- Species: T. biremis

Binomial name
- Tatria biremis Kowalewski 1904

Species of Cestoda

Tatria biremis is a species of tapeworm in the family Amabiliidae.

It infects certain grebes (Podiceps) and uses the water boatman species Paracorixa concinna as an intermediate host.
