= Tatria jubilaea =

Scientific classification
- Kingdom: Animalia
- Phylum: Platyhelminthes
- Class: Cestoda
- Order: Cyclophyllidea
- Family: Amabiliidae
- Genus: Tatria
- Species: T. jubilaea

Binomial name
- Tatria jubilaea Okorokov & Tkachev, 1973

Species of flatworm

Tatria jubilaea is a species of tapeworm in the family Amabiliidae.
