= Tatria duodecacantha =

Scientific classification
- Kingdom: Animalia
- Phylum: Platyhelminthes
- Class: Cestoda
- Order: Cyclophyllidea
- Family: Amabiliidae
- Genus: Tatria
- Species: T. duodecacantha

Binomial name
- Tatria duodecacantha (Olsen, 1939)

Species of flatworms

Tatria duodecacantha is a species of tapeworm in the family Amabiliidae. It infects the pied-billed grebe (Podilymbus podiceps podiceps).

Tatria duodecacantha was discovered in 1939 in Iowa but has also been reported from pied-billed grebes in Oklahoma.

Morphologically, Tatria duodecacantha differs from other Tatria species by the number and shape of the rostellar hooks. It typically has 12 rostellar hooks but the number can vary. Around one in five worms has a different number of hooks, ranging from at least 10-13 hooks.
