= Tatria octacantha =

Scientific classification
- Kingdom: Animalia
- Phylum: Platyhelminthes
- Class: Cestoda
- Order: Cyclophyllidea
- Family: Amabiliidae
- Genus: Tatria
- Species: T. octacantha

Binomial name
- Tatria octacantha Rees 1974

Synonyms
- Joyeuxilepis octacantha (Rees, 1973)

Species of flatworm

Tatria octacantha is a species of tapeworm in the family Amabiliidae.
