= Tatria minor =

Scientific classification
- Domain: Eukaryota
- Kingdom: Animalia
- Phylum: Platyhelminthes
- Class: Cestoda
- Order: Cyclophyllidea
- Family: Amabiliidae
- Genus: Tatria
- Species: T. minor

Binomial name
- Tatria minor Kowalewski, 1904

Species of flatworm

Tatria minor is an endoparasitic tapeworm which infects grebes in the Palaearctic. It is common in the horned grebe in Lake Mývatn, Iceland.
