= Podiceps csarnotanus =

Podiceps csarnotanus Temporal range: Zanclean–Piacenzian

Scientific classification
- Kingdom: Animalia
- Phylum: Chordata
- Class: Aves
- Order: Podicipediformes
- Family: Podicipedidae
- Genus: Podiceps
- Species: †P. csarnotanus

Binomial name
- †Podiceps csarnotanus Kessler, 2009

Extinct species of grebe

Podiceps csarnotanus is an extinct species of Upper Pliocene grebe from Hungary.

== History ==
The species was described by Eugene Kessler in 2009 as part of a series of papers that described fossil material that have been retrieved form the Carpathian Basin. The species name "csarnotanus" is named after the site it was discovered Csarnóta.

== Description ==
The holotype (MÁFI V. 09. 61. 1) is the distal fragment of the right ulna, which the size of it falls in between the horned grebe (P. auritus) and the red-necked grebe (P. grisegena). In comparison to the recent species of Podiceps and the Aechmophorus, the condylus ventralis is elongated and prominent. The condylus dorsalis is rounded, while in modern Podiceps and Aechmophorus it just emerges. The cranial surface of the diaphysis is slightly convex, not flat unlike in modern Podiceps.

== Paleobiology ==
P. csarnotanus comes from the Carpathian Basin which is located in South Hungary. The locality of which, Csarnóta–2, dates to the ages from the Zanclean to the Piacenzian. The species was part of an avifauna consisted of Neogene genera as well as extant or modern genera of birds.
