= Tatria iunii =

Scientific classification
- Kingdom: Animalia
- Phylum: Platyhelminthes
- Class: Cestoda
- Order: Cyclophyllidea
- Family: Amabiliidae
- Genus: Tatria
- Species: T. iunii

Binomial name
- Tatria iunii Korpaczewska & Sulgostowska 1974

Species of Cestoda

Tatria iunii is a species of tapeworm in the family Amabiliidae.

It is a parasite of the little grebe and has been reported from Poland.
