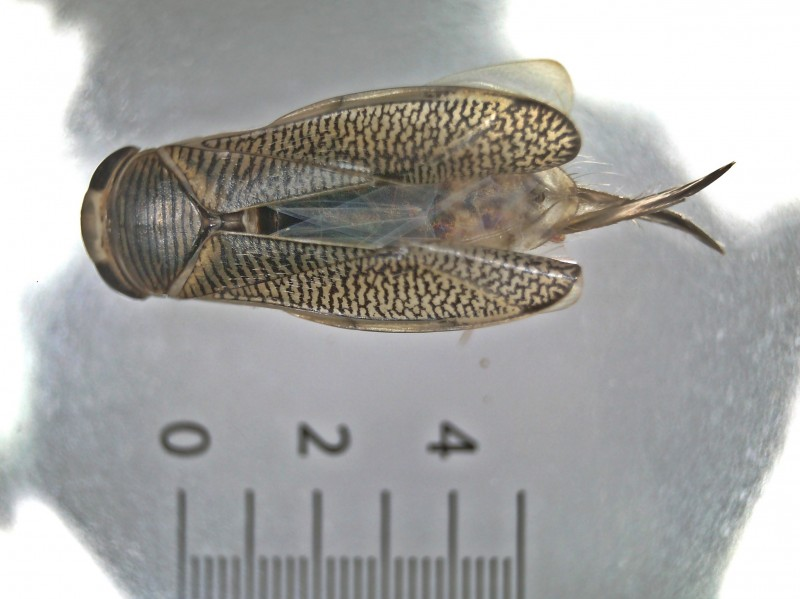

Scientific classification
- Domain: Eukaryota
- Kingdom: Animalia
- Phylum: Arthropoda
- Class: Insecta
- Order: Hemiptera
- Suborder: Heteroptera
- Family: Corixidae
- Genus: Paracorixa
- Species: P. concinna

Binomial name
- Paracorixa concinna (Fieber, 1848)

= Paracorixa concinna =

Species of true bug

Paracorixa concinna is a species of water boatman in the family Corixidae. It is found in Europe

It has been reported to be an intermediate host to the tapeworm species Tatria biremis which infects grebes of the genus Podiceps.
