= Raudna Nature Reserve =

Protected area in Estonia

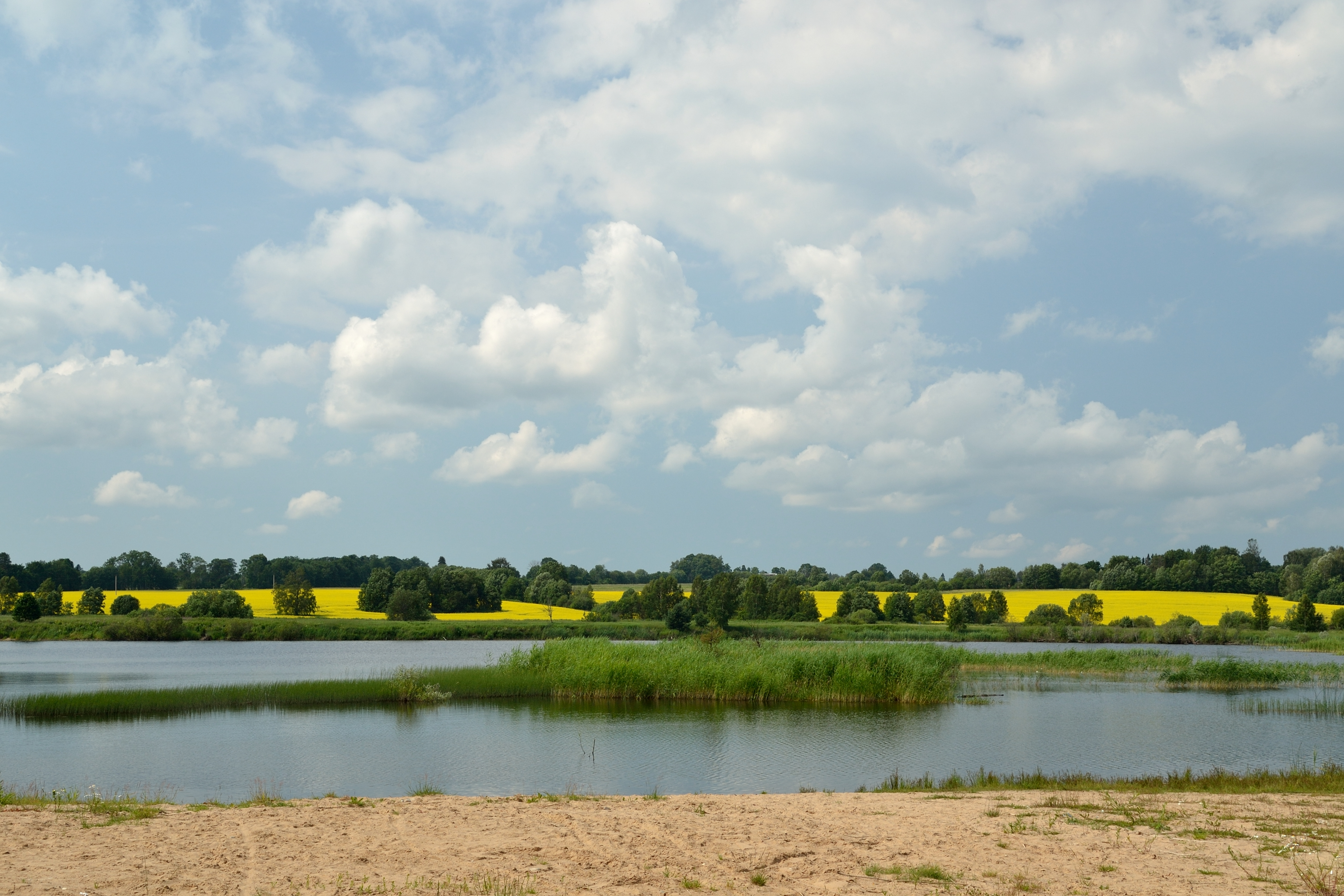

- Location within Estonia
- Location: Estonia
- Coordinates: 58°20′13″N 25°28′20″E
- Area: 29 ha (72 acres)
- Established: 1994

Raudna Nature Reserve is a nature reserve situated in southern Estonia, in Viljandi County.

Raudna Nature Reserve protects a former quarry, now a lake, which functions as an important resting-place for migratory birds, as well as feeding and breeding ground for them. On the little islands in the lake, birds like coot and red-necked grebe make their nests. Other species of protected birds often found in the area includes little ringed plover, common tern and Eurasian curlew. The flora includes different species of orchids.
