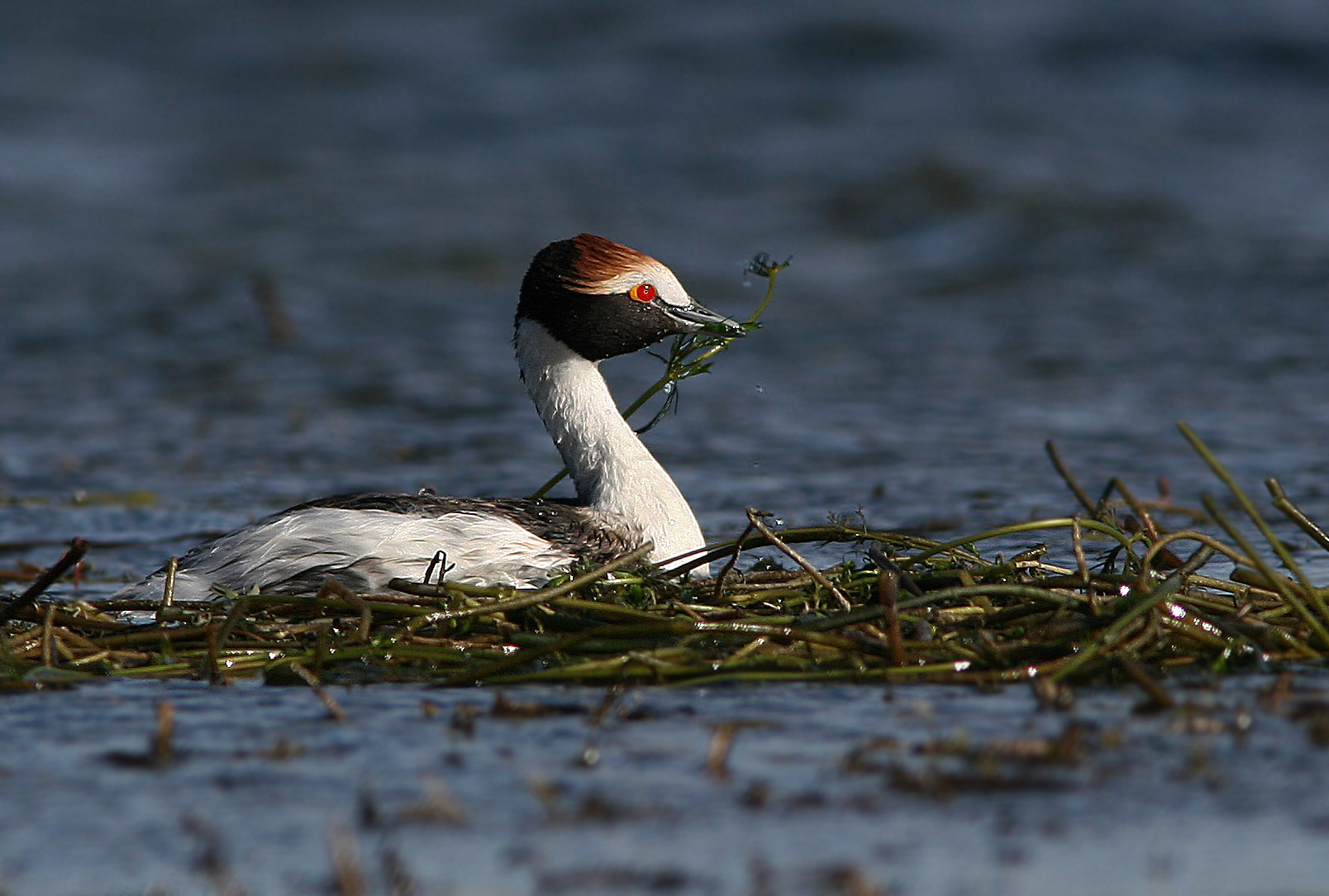

Conservation status
- Critically Endangered (IUCN 3.1)

Scientific classification
- Kingdom: Animalia
- Phylum: Chordata
- Class: Aves
- Order: Podicipediformes
- Family: Podicipedidae
- Genus: Podiceps
- Species: P. gallardoi

Binomial name
- Podiceps gallardoi Rumboll, 1974

= Hooded grebe =

Species of bird

The hooded grebe (Podiceps gallardoi) is a medium-sized grebe found in the southern region of Argentina. It grows to about 32 cm (13 in) in length, and is black and white in color. It is found in isolated lakes in the most remote parts of Patagonia and spends winters along the coast of the same region. In 2012 IUCN uplisted the species from Endangered to Critically Endangered.

== Ecology ==
During the breeding season the hooded grebe is found on basaltic lakes in the Patagonian steppes at elevations of 500–1,200 m (1,600–3,900 ft). Both saline and bitter salt lakes are used by non breeding flocks and some birds which winter on the coast of Argentina. The grebe requires aquatic vegetation in its breeding lakes (primarily Myriophyllum elatinoides) which it uses to build its nest. The vegetation is also the habitat of the aquatic invertebrates on which the hooded grebe feeds. For example, in the week after hatching the chicks are fed aquatic beetles (Limnaea spp.). Nesting takes place in colonies of up to 130 pairs from October to March. However, its rate of reproduction is very low as the average number of young reared per adult is 0.2 annually. A grebe can only lay up to two eggs in a clutch, and they usually only take care of one egg. Kelp gulls prey on the eggs and baby grebes, further decreasing the successful reproduction rate. Additionally, strong winds can also flood and destroy the nests. Despite the lack of breeding success, the resources required for adult survival are abundant and this has resulted in a low adult mortality rate.

== Threats ==
At all stages of the grebe's life it is vulnerable to predation by the American mink. When the mink first arrived in 2010–2011 on the Buenos Aires plateau, it killed more than half the adults in a breeding colony of two dozen nests. In 2012 to 2013 more losses to one mink occurred with 15 adults and 7 juveniles killed at El Cervecero and 10 adults and 5 chicks killed at the C199 colony in La Siberia plateau. As most of the grebe population is currently in the Buenos Aires plateau the grebe is under serious threat by the mink. The American mink also carries out surplus killing, thus meaning that a single mink may result in the loss of whole grebe colonies.

Other threats to the grebe population are: excessive grazing by sheep (this leads to erosion at land shores and limits the growth of vegetation), attacks by flying steamer ducks (Tachyeres patachonicus), predation by kelp gulls, and competition with the silvery grebe. Rainbow trout have been introduced to many of the lakes the hooded grebe use and have become a serious competitor due to eating much of the same prey as the hooded grebe. Volcanic eruptions in the area may have a negative short-term effect on population size due to heavy ash fall. However, ash also results in a long-term increase in the productivity of the wetlands.

== Habitat ==
The hooded grebe can be found in basaltic lakes during the breeding season. Each year, the Hooded Grebe alternates which basaltic lake it uses for the breeding season. Its decision is based on the size, water level, and abundance of aquatic plants at each lake. At the moment, the only recorded wintering sites are estuaries on the Atlantic coast of Argentina.

== Distribution and population ==
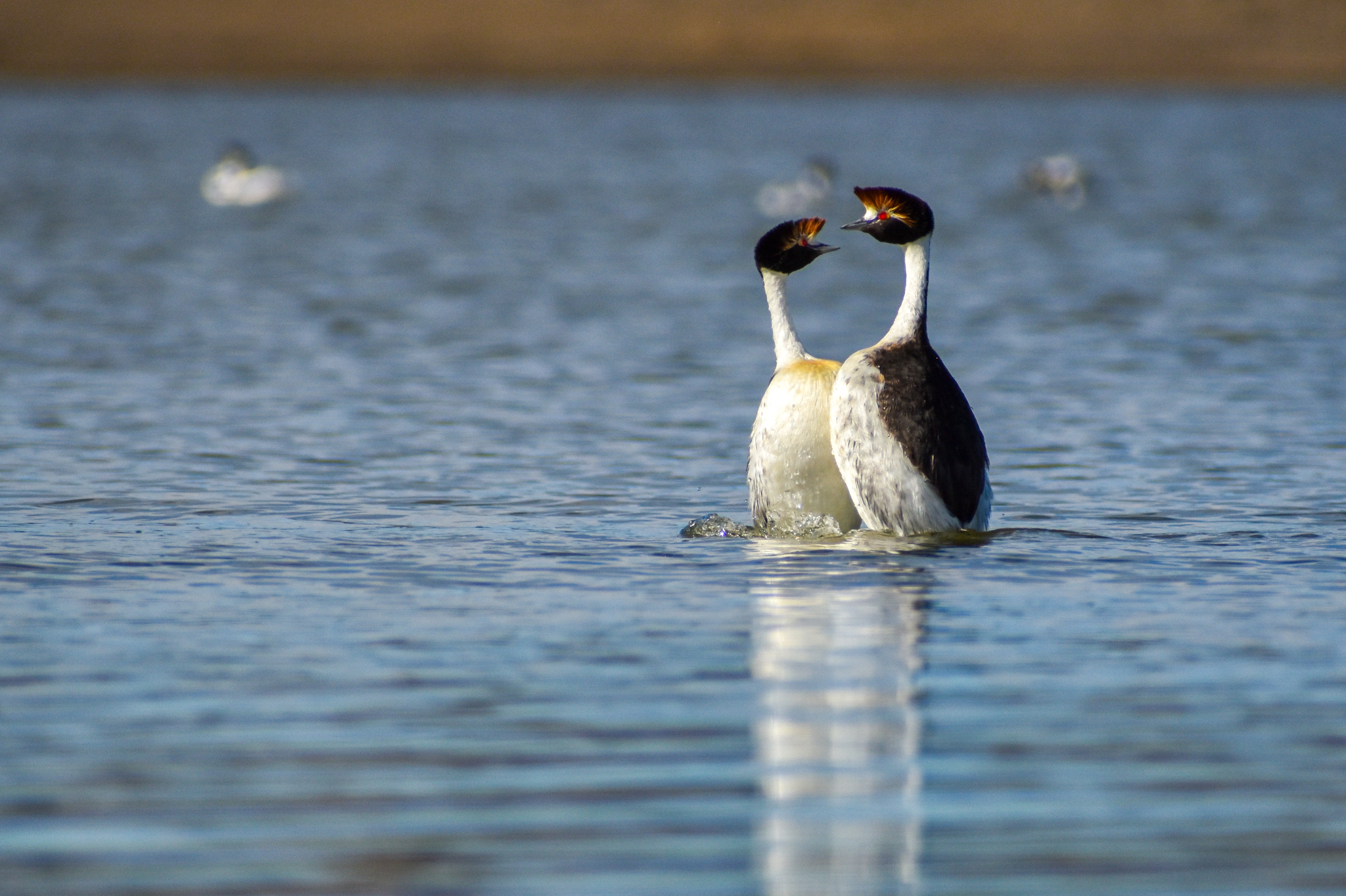
Courtship

=== Distribution ===
Distribution of this species is very sparse. As of 2025, 741 adult Hooded grebes have been recorded across their breeding sites. The few breeding sites of this species are located on high-altitude plateaus in western Santa Cruz, and during the winter the birds migrate to large estuaries, most notably the Santa Cruz River.

The Hooded grebe's species status was updated to Critically Endangered in 2012. The population decline is attributed to the introduction of Minks and Trout into its breeding sites, alongside increased predation by Kelp gulls.

=== Population size ===
In 1997 the total population size was estimated at 3,000–5,000 individuals, with roughly half being on Meseta de Strobel, a high-altitude basaltic plateau in the remote Patagonian steppes of Santa Cruz. Subsequent counts on wintering grounds indicated a 40% decline over a seven-year period. Surveys conducted in December 2006 and January 2009 revisited key breeding sites first surveyed in 1987 and 1998 and revealed dramatic reductions in population. Counts during the 2010 and 2011 breeding season also showed that the species has gone on a decline of more than 80% over the past 26 years.

=== Population justification ===
The population size was estimated by O'Donnell and Fjeldsa (1997) to consist of 3,000–5,000 individuals. However, recent winter counts deduced that the minimum population size was 759 in 2010/2011. In new surveys, which occurred after recent and rapid declines in population size, the new estimation is 1,000–1,200 individuals. With 660–800 of those individuals having reached full maturity. In 2013, a survey reported at total of 771 adults and 138 chicks.

=== Trend justification ===
Studies on the wintering grounds concluded that, since the 1990s, the population may have declined by as much as 40%. If we assume an exponential rate of decline then we can predict that there is a rapid population decline of above 80% over 21 years (three generations). This trend is supported by surveys on the breeding grounds, as when the breeding grounds were counted in the winter of 2010 and 2011 no juvenile Hooded Grebes were found.

== Appearance ==
The main features of the hooded grebe's appearance which can be used for identification.

- Mainly white wings and flanks, with a dark grey back
- A black hood with a contrasting white forehead
- A red/golden crest

== Status and conservation ==
The hooded grebe is threatened by climate change and the introduction of trout and salmon to the Strobel plateau. Surveys made in 2006, 2009 and 2010–2011, found some lakes completely dry and with water levels 2–3 metres (6 ft 7 in – 9 ft 10 in) lower than in previous years. In addition, winter snowfall has reduced without a corresponding increase in precipitation at other times of the year.

Predation by kelp gulls (Larus dominicanus) at some lakes, predation by the recently introduced American mink, the excessive grazing by sheep and low breeding potential have been cited as threats.

=== Conservation actions underway ===
Laguna Los Escarchados (the site where the species was discovered in 1974) was declared a reserve in 1979, but hold only a marginal population. In 1992, six individuals were recorded within Perito Moreno National Park. The key breeding lakes in the core of its range, lack any kind of legal protection, but the population of the hooded grebe on Meseta de Strobel have some protection due to its inaccessibility. A 30-minute documentary called 'Tango in the Wind' outlines conservation actions to save the hooded grebe.

=== Conservation actions proposed ===
One proposed action is removing the trout (whether it be all or only some of the trout) in lakes where hooded grebe reproduction occurs. The recommendations below all come from the final report of the Hooded Grebe Project Continue to survey the breeding colonies and winter censuses of estuaries and unfrozen lakes. Expand the 'Colony Guardian' approach to all active colonies. Devise and carry out a species recovery plan. Remove the American Mink from the high plateau habitats and control the size of Kelp Gull populations on breeding sites. Increase the area ban on the introduction of salmonids to grebe breeding locations and help raise awareness of the impacts of introducing salmonids. Study the grebe's ecology in more detail in order to understand its population movements. There is planned research into the grebe's migration which is supported by the Zoological Society of London's EDGE of Existence programme and Cornell University. Gather empirical data on population size and trends in population size. Continue to study the main threats to the grebe population and the reasons behind recent declines. The use of Patagonia National Park as a protected area where species management activities occur. The establishment of the species as a National Natural Monument.
