= Tatria gulyaevi =

Scientific classification
- Kingdom: Animalia
- Phylum: Platyhelminthes
- Class: Cestoda
- Order: Cyclophyllidea
- Family: Amabiliidae
- Genus: Tatria
- Species: T. gulyaevi

Binomial name
- Tatria gulyaevi Vasileva, Gibson & Bray, 2003

Species of Cestoda

Tatria gulyaevi is a species of tapeworm in the family Amabiliidae.
