= Paracorixa =

Scientific classification
- Domain: Eukaryota
- Kingdom: Animalia
- Phylum: Arthropoda
- Class: Insecta
- Order: Hemiptera
- Suborder: Heteroptera
- Family: Corixidae
- Genus: Paracorixa; Stichel, 1955

Genus of true bugs

Paracorixa is a genus of true bugs belonging to the family Corixidae.

The species of this genus are found in Europe and Russia.

Species:

- Paracorixa concinna (Fieber, 1848)
