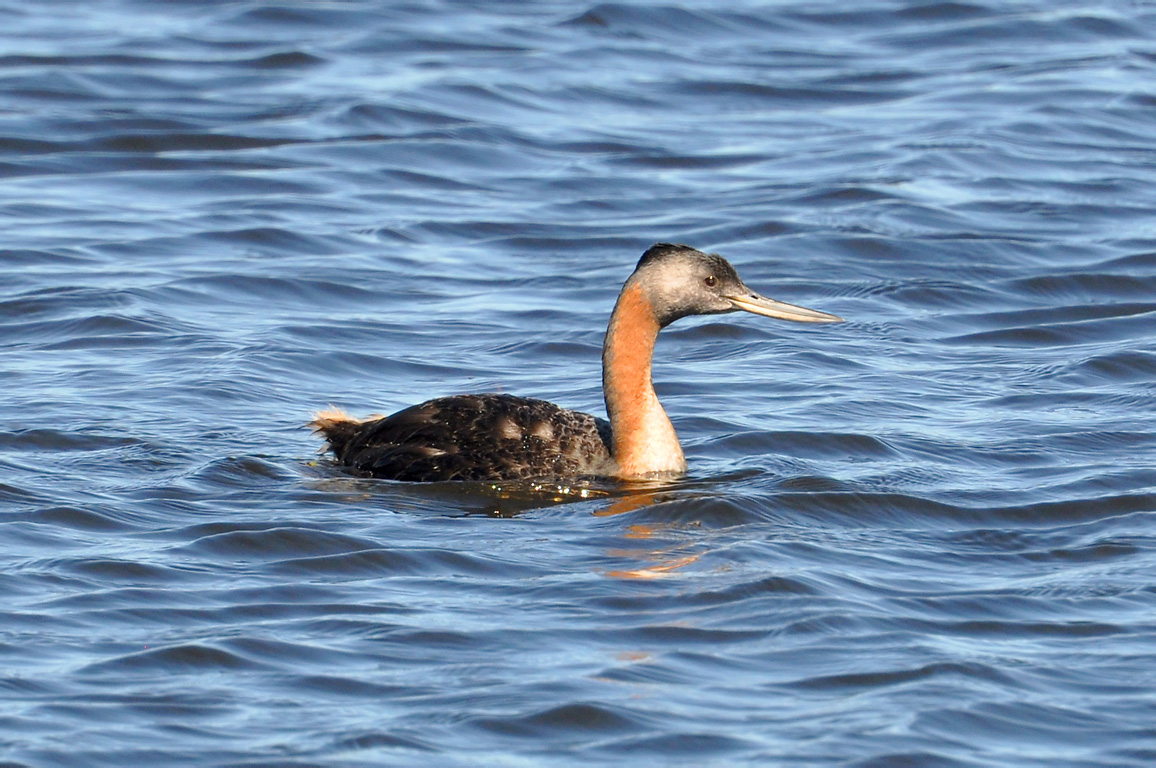
- In Rio Grande do Sul, Brazil

Conservation status
- Least Concern (IUCN 3.1)

Scientific classification
- Kingdom: Animalia
- Phylum: Chordata
- Class: Aves
- Order: Podicipediformes
- Family: Podicipedidae
- Genus: Podiceps
- Species: P. major

Binomial name
- Podiceps major (Boddaert, 1783)

Synonyms
- Podicephorus major (Boddaert 1783) Bochenski 1994

= Great grebe =

Species of bird

The great grebe (Podiceps major) is the largest species of grebe in the world. A disjunct population exists in northwestern Peru, while the main distribution is from extreme southeastern Brazil to Patagonia and central Chile. The population from southern Chile is considered a separate subspecies, P. m. navasi.

== Taxonomy ==
The great grebe was described by the French polymath Georges-Louis Leclerc, Comte de Buffon in 1781 in his Histoire Naturelle des Oiseaux. The bird was also illustrated in a hand-coloured plate engraved by François-Nicolas Martinet in the Planches Enluminées D'Histoire Naturelle, which was produced under the supervision of Edme-Louis Daubenton to accompany Buffon's text. Neither the plate caption nor Buffon's description included a scientific name but in 1783 the Dutch naturalist Pieter Boddaert coined the binomial name Colymbus major in his catalogue of the Planches Enluminées. Buffon mistakenly believed that his specimen had come from Cayenne in French Guiana. The great grebe is now placed in the genus Podiceps that was erected by the English naturalist John Latham in 1787.

Two subspecies are recognised:

- P. m. major, (Boddaert, 1783), West Peru, Paraguay, southeastern Brazil, Uruguay to central Chile and southern Argentina
- P. m. navasi, (Manghi, 1984), Southern Chile

== Habitat ==
This species occurs mainly in open waterways. Most birds are seen on low altitude lakes and sluggish rivers (often surrounded by forests), as well as estuarine marshes. While breeding, it frequents the heavily vegetated inlets off of large lakes. Outside of the breeding season, most birds will move to estuaries and bays, usually heavy with kelp (occasionally, they even are seen on the open sea). Non-breeding birds may live along the coasts all year.

These birds are widespread and common through most of their range. Much of their native habitat has not been cleared, especially in the southern portions of their range.

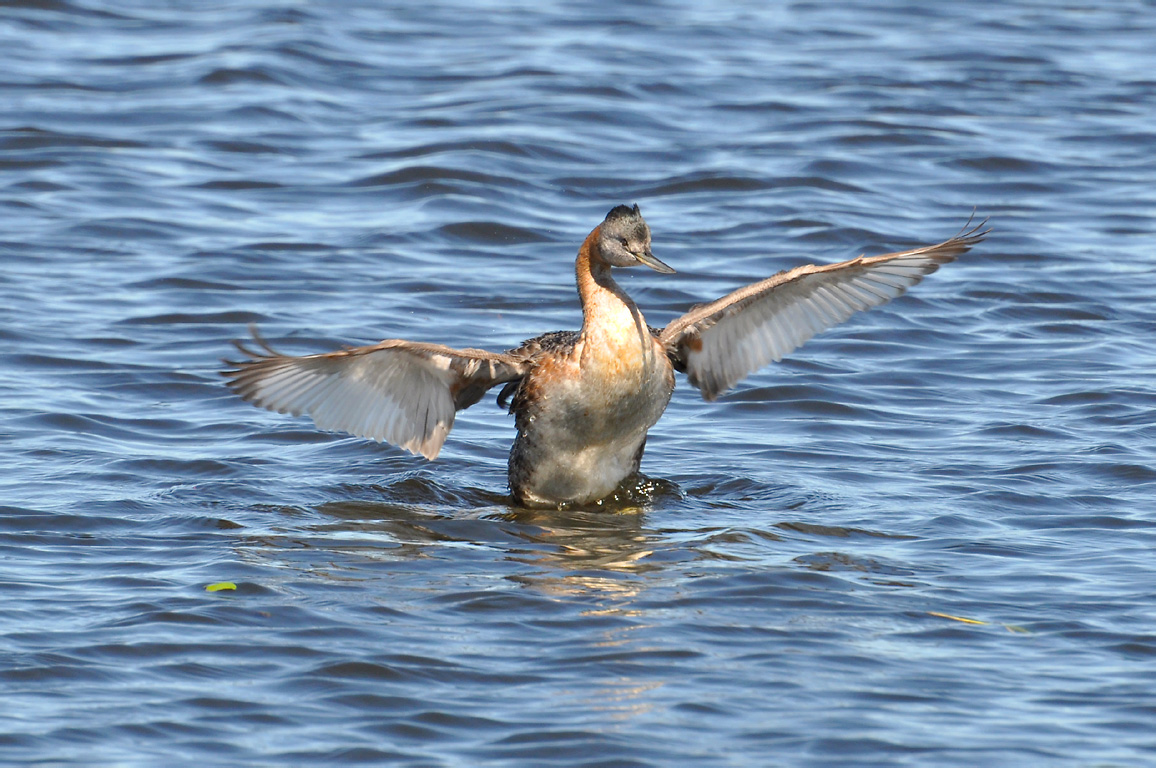
In Rio Grande do Sul, Brazil

== Description ==
This is a very large grebe, with proportions more like a goose or a cormorant than a typical grebe. They range in length from 67 to 80 cm (26.5 to 31.5 in) and usually weigh about 1,600 grams (3.5 pounds), but can scale to at least 2 kg (4.4 lb). They are buffy-rufous on the neck and chest, blackish on the back and have a whitish belly. The head is sooty gray with a reddish-brown eye. Due to its size and unique coloration, the great grebe is unlikely to be confused with any other bird, including other grebes.

== Diet ==
The great grebe lives on a diet mostly of fish, sometimes over 11 cm (4.3 in) long, but usually smaller. Prey competition can occasionally occur with the neotropic cormorant over fish, but that species (in spite of smaller body size) usually takes larger fish. Also insects, crustaceans and mollusks are taken. The diet can switch to almost half crabs during the wintertime along the coasts, and these birds can also take the young of other waterbirds, especially coots.

== Breeding ==
After living in groups numbering up to the hundreds, these birds move inland to breed. Most populations lay their eggs from October to January, becoming later further south. In the isolated Peru population, nesting occurs in September and October, with a possible second clutch in January or February. They are moderately social when breeding, occasionally forming colonies. Three to five eggs (sometimes six) are laid. Two broods, or possibly more, can be raised at the same time.
