= Colombian grebe =

Conservation status
- Extinct (1977) (IUCN 3.1)

Scientific classification
- Kingdom: Animalia
- Phylum: Chordata
- Class: Aves
- Order: Podicipediformes
- Family: Podicipedidae
- Genus: Podiceps
- Species: †P. andinus

Binomial name
- †Podiceps andinus (Meyer de Schauensee, 1959)

Extinct species of bird

The Colombian grebe (Podiceps andinus) is an extinct species of flightless grebe that inhabited the Bogotá wetlands on the Bogotá savanna in the Eastern Ranges of the Andes of Colombia. The species was still abundant in Lake Tota in 1945.

The decline of the Colombian grebe is attributed to wetland drainage, siltation, pesticide pollution, disruption by reed harvesting, hunting, competition, and predation of chicks by invasive introduced rainbow trout (Oncorhynchus mykiss). The primary reason was loss of habitat: drainage of wetlands and siltation resulted in higher concentrations of pollutants, causing eutrophication across Lake Tota. This destroyed the open, submergent pondweed (Potamogeton) vegetation and resulted in the formation of a dense monoculture of water weed (Elodea).

== Description ==
The species has often been considered a subspecies of black-necked grebe (P. nigricollis), and is genetically nested within it; it differed from black-necked grebe most notably in having a reddish-brown (not black) foreneck, and more orangey-toned (rather than yellow) ear tufts.

== Taxonomy ==
The Colombian grebe was first described by Rodolphe Meyer de Schauensee in 1959. This species was once thought to be a subspecies of the black-necked grebe (Podiceps nigricollis). However, because of differences in plumage colour and pattern, it is generally considered a monotypic species.

== Habitat ==
The Colombian grebe was found in high-altitude, reeded lakes. It preferred clear, freshwater habitats composed of emerging vegetation that could be used for nesting and cover.

== Distribution ==
The Colombian grebe lived in the Bogotá wetlands on the eastern side of the Andes in Colombia. It was known as a resident of the Cundinamarca department since the 1920s and of Lake Tota in the department of Boyacá. The Colombian grebe was an endemic species of the region.

== Behaviour ==
=== Vocalization ===
Grebes produce a range of different calls utilized for various situations. A tremolo call is a common vocalization, consisting of a rapid, high-pitched trill, used to communicate with mates or during territorial disputes. A wailing call is a plaintive, mournful-sounding vocalization produced during courtship rituals and displays. They can also make a whinny call, a softer, high-pitched series of notes, to communicate with other individuals. Contact calls are soft calls used to maintain contact with their offspring or mate when swimming together. Aggression calls are produced during territorial disputes or interactions with other individuals.

=== Diet ===
Specific details on the Colombian grebe’s diet are unclear because of the extinction and few observations. The Colombian grebe’s diet is thought to resemble the diet of its close relative, the Eared Grebe (Podiceps nigricollis). Being a strong swimmer and diver, its diet would likely have been composed of fish, insects and other aquatic prey.

=== Reproduction ===
No data were recorded regarding the reproduction of the Colombian grebe. Several females were ready to lay in August, suggesting the main laying season was between August and September.

== Evolution ==
The extinct Colombian grebe represents an example of rapid evolution and incipient speciation. Genetic studies show that the Colombian grebe evolved from ancestral black-necked grebes (Podiceps nigricollis californicus) that moved from North America into South America during the Pleistocene epoch. After becoming isolated in the high-altitude wetlands of the Colombian Andes, the birds quickly adapted to their local environment. They developed distinct visual traits, including a grayish crown and chestnut-coloured neck feathers, as well as a significantly longer, wider, and deeper bill specialized for catching small invertebrates. Because the Colombian grebe still shares deep genetic links with the black-necked grebe, scientists classify it as an incipient species, a lineage caught in the act of forming a new species through rapid adaptation and geographic isolation.

== Conservation ==
The Colombian grebe is now considered an extinct species by the IUCN Red List of Threatened Species. No sightings of the species have been made since 1977. The Colombian grebe was considered abundant on Lake Tota in the 1940s and was periodically seen on other lakes of Sabana de Bogotá up to the early 1950s. The population of Lake Tota was estimated at 300 individuals in 1968, only 1 individual observed in 1972, and 1 to 3 individuals in 1977. Then, no record of the grebe was made after. Exhaustive surveys were done in 1981 and 1982, and none were found.
