= Joyeuxilepis =

Scientific classification
- Kingdom: Animalia
- Phylum: Platyhelminthes
- Class: Cestoda
- Order: Cyclophyllidea
- Family: Amabiliidae
- Genus: Joyeuxilepis; Spassky, 1947

Genus of flatworms

Joyeuxilepis is a genus of tapeworms in the family Amabiliidae. It contains 6 known species.

== Species ==
- Joyeuxilepis acanthorhyncha (Wedl, 1855) Borgarenko & Gulyaev, 1990
- Joyeuxilepis biuncinata (Joyeux & Gaud, 1945) Spassky, 1947
- Joyeuxilepis decacantha (Fuhrmann, 1913) Gulyaev, 1989
- Joyeuxilepis decacanthoides Borgarenko & Gulyaev, 1991
- Joyeuxilepis fuhrmanni (Solomon, 1932) Borgarenko & Gulyaev, 1990
- Joyeuxilepis uralensis Gulyaev, 1989
