= Podiceps parvus =

Scientific classification
- Kingdom: Animalia
- Phylum: Chordata
- Class: Aves
- Order: Podicipediformes
- Family: Podicipedidae
- Genus: Podiceps
- Species: †P. parvus

Binomial name
- †Podiceps parvus Schufeldt, 1913

Synonyms
- Colymbus parvus Colymbus (Dytes) parvus

Extinct species of bird

Podiceps parvus was a grebe in the genus Podiceps native to the North America. It went extinct in late Pleistocene.

First described by Robert W. Shufeldt in 1913.

== Distribution and age range ==
Podiceps parvus fossils were found in Mexico and western USA (Oregon, California). Earliest recovered parts are dated back 3.6 million years ago. Latest ones - about 11,700 years ago.

== Ecology and characteristics ==
Unknown. It was a carnivore, its diet likely contained invertebrates and small vertebrates.

Material collected from Fossil Lake in 2010 was studied. The ulna had a maximum length of 91.15 mm and carpometacarpus 40.65 mm.
