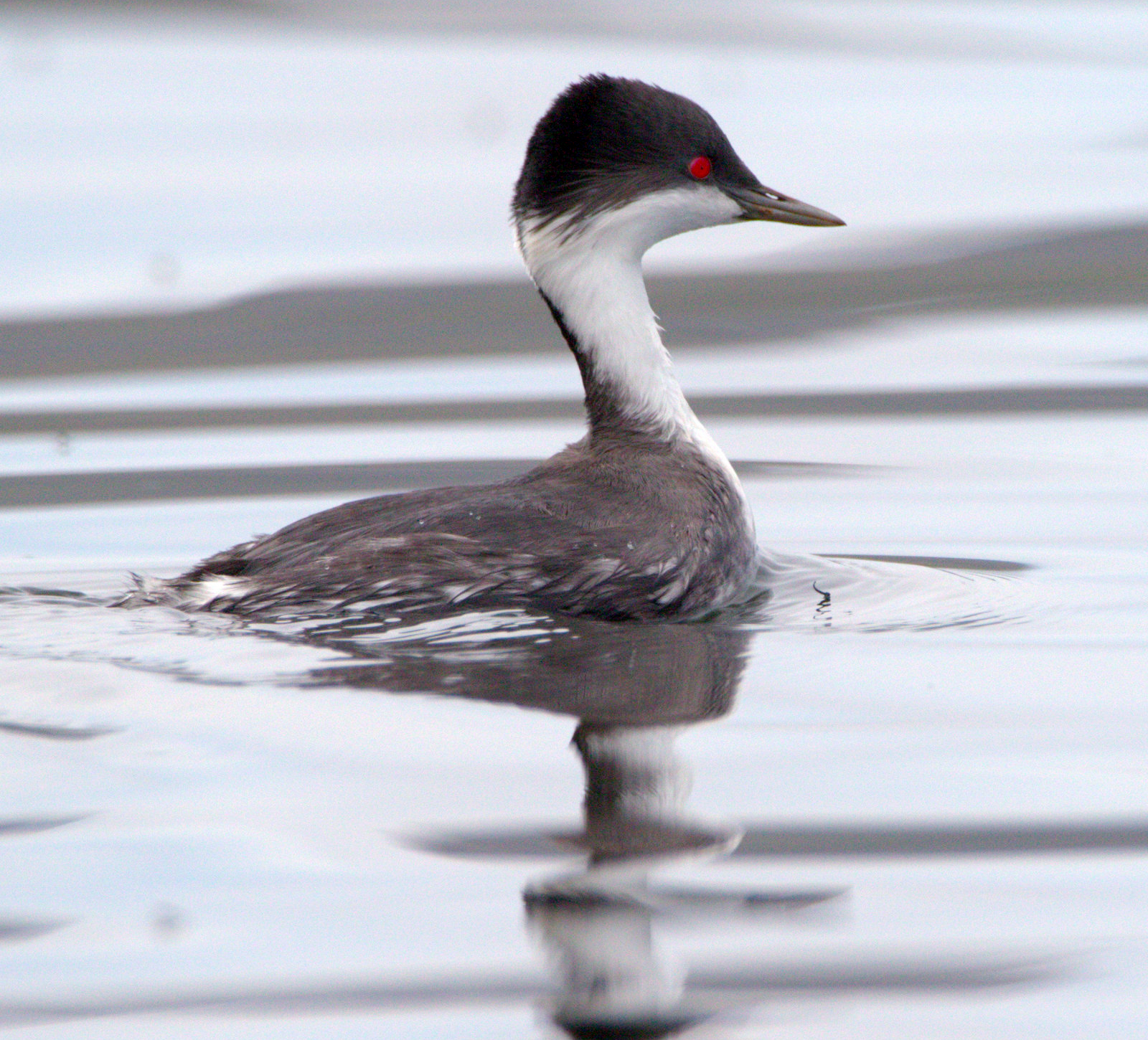
- Adult swimming

Conservation status
- Endangered (IUCN 3.1)

Scientific classification
- Kingdom: Animalia
- Phylum: Chordata
- Class: Aves
- Order: Podicipediformes
- Family: Podicipedidae
- Genus: Podiceps
- Species: P. taczanowskii

Binomial name
- Podiceps taczanowskii Berlepsch & Stolzmann, 1894
- Range in center of circle

= Junin grebe =

Species of bird

The Junin grebe (Podiceps taczanowskii), also known as Junin flightless grebe or puna grebe, is a flightless species of grebe endemic to Lake Junin in the Andean highlands of Junin in west-central Peru. An endangered species, the current population is estimated at 300–400 individuals, including 140–320 adults.

== Taxonomy ==
The scientific name commemorates the Polish zoologist Władysław Taczanowski, author of Ornithology of Peru (1884–86).

== Description ==
With a size of approximately 35 cm (14 in), the Junin grebe has a dark grey crown extending down the back of its neck to a black back. It has white lower parts of the face, neck and underparts, with a narrow grey bill. Perhaps the most striking feature is its bright red eyes. On the side of the head of adults there are silvery grey feathers, which are absent on non-breeding adults and juveniles. The Junin grebe closely resembles the smaller, shorter-necked and shorter-billed northern silvery grebe, which also is found in Lake Junin.

The calls of the Junin grebe include melodic whistles doo' ith, wit, and a longer phooee-th when trying to attract a mate.

== Behaviour and ecology ==
=== Breeding ===
Courtship involves two grebes facing breast to breast and turning their head quickly from side to side, called 'head-shaking'. The nests of Junin grebes are built in reed beds around the border of Lake Junin, and a typical clutch size is two eggs, laid in December or January. The grebe generally breeds in bays and channels around the edge of the lake, within 8–75 m (26–246 ft) of reed beds, entering the reeds only for nesting or roosting. In years when the water level of the lake is particularly low, no young are raised. When not breeding, Junin grebe prefer open water, moving far out from lake shores.

=== Feeding ===
About 90% of the diet of the Junin grebe is small fish, especially those less than 2.5 cm (1 in) long, with the remaining part of its diet being small invertebrates. Fish are caught with its excellent diving skills, but insects may also be caught at the surface. They can be often seen feeding and diving simultaneously in small groups.

== Distribution and habitat ==
Junin grebes are found only in and around Lake Junin, in west-central Peru. The lake covers approximately 140 km^{2} (54 sq mi) and at its deepest is 10 m (33 ft) deep, although most of the lake is less than 5 m (16 ft) deep. Around the borders of the lake are substantial reed marshes, where the grebes nest and roost.

== Conservation status ==
Lake Junin has been classed as a national reserve since 1974, which has restricted the amount of fishing and hunting that can take place there. More recently, in 2002, the Peruvian government made an emergency law to place harsher restrictions on water extraction and provisions for cleaning of the lake, but so far this has not been properly enforced. Attempts have been made to translocate the grebes to a lake just north of Lake Junin, however gill nets used to catch rainbow trout in this lake meant it was unsuccessful. Further studies are being carried out to locate other lakes that the Junin grebe could successfully be translocated to.

Large fluctuations in water levels, caused by a nearby hydroelectric plant and unstable climatic conditions (in part linked to El Niño), water pollution from mining activities and sewage, burning of reeds, competition for food with the introduced rainbow trout, and drowning in fishing nets, have caused the population of Junin grebes to fall from more than 1000 individuals in 1961 to about 300-400 individuals in the 2010s. The hydroelectric plant and droughts can cause the water level to drop below 5 m (16 ft) which prevents the birds from raising chicks, and can cause damage to the bordering reed marshes. The Junin grebe and the Junin white-tufted grebe (Rollandia rolland morrisoni) are both restricted to the lake and they are specialists that primarily feed on the native fish. The environmental damage and the introduced, predatory rainbow trout have caused the native fish population to plummet, along with the populations of the two endemic grebes. In contrast, the northern silvery grebe (Podiceps occipitalis juninensis), which is widespread in the Andes and mostly feeds on small invertebrates, was historically rare in Lake Junin, but is now common.

A local organisation, Asociaciόn Ecosistemas Andinos, is working to educate local people about the Junin grebe and the Junin rail, which is also endemic to the lake. The aim is to raise awareness of the issue, and get the mining and hydroelectric plant organisations to understand the issue.
