= Tatria skrjabini =

Scientific classification
- Kingdom: Animalia
- Phylum: Platyhelminthes
- Class: Cestoda
- Order: Cyclophyllidea
- Family: Amabiliidae
- Genus: Tatria
- Species: T. skrjabini

Binomial name
- Tatria skrjabini Tretiakova 1948

Species of flatworm

Tatria skrjabini is a species of tapeworm in the family Amabiliidae.

It lives as a parasite in the intestines of the little grebe (Podiceps ruficollis).
