= Podiceps solidus =

Podiceps solidus Temporal range: Messinian–Zanclean

Scientific classification
- Domain: Eukaryota
- Kingdom: Animalia
- Phylum: Chordata
- Class: Aves
- Order: Podicipediformes
- Family: Podicipedidae
- Genus: Podiceps
- Species: †P. solidus

Binomial name
- †Podiceps solidus Kuročkin, 1985

Extinct species of grebe

Podiceps solidus is an extinct small species of Upper Miocene to Lower Pliocene grebe from Western Mongolia.

== History ==
The species was first described in 1985 by Kuročkin. Zelenkov would describe more material that is housed at the Paleontological Institute, Russian Academy of Sciences in 2013.

== Description ==
The holotype (PIN 3222/37) is of a distal fragment of the right humerus. The additional material that would later be described by Zelenkov (2013) include a distal fragment of the left tibiotarsus (PIN 3378/98), a right coracoid (PIN 3378/113), and a distal portion of a tarsometatarsus (PIN 3378/96) from an immature bird. The size of the bones suggests a smaller species of grebe comparable to both black-necked grebe (P. nigricollis) and horned grebe (P. auritus). For example, the coracoid is most similar to the black-necked grebe, while the tibotarsus is more closer to those of horned grebes.

== Classification ==
The species is a member of the genus Podiceps. P. solidus was compared to P. pisanus of the Piacenzian Italy. P. pisanus is often considered to be a junior synonym of the horned grebe. Zelenkov (2013) argues, however, that P. solidus is not a junior synonym of either P. pisanus or the horned grebe, due to the aforementioned mosaic characters it has with both horned and black-necked grebes, possibly closely related to the last common ancestor of these species.

== Paleobiology ==
The temporal range of the specimens shows P. solidus existed from the Messinian to the Zanclean of Mongolia. The holotype was found at the locality Hyargas-Nuur 2 dating to the Upper Miocene, while the other specimens found at the localities Chono-Harayah 1 and 2, and Zogsoo-Harhan 1 and 4 dating to the Lower Pliocene. In a later paper that discusses the evolution of Neogene Central Asian avifauna Zelenkov (2016) noted how quickly grebes have established themselves in the region, going from primitive genera such as the Aquitanian Miobaptus to the modern Podiceps.
