= Podiceps discors =

Podiceps discors Temporal range: Piacenzian

Scientific classification
- Domain: Eukaryota
- Kingdom: Animalia
- Phylum: Chordata
- Class: Aves
- Order: Podicipediformes
- Family: Podicipedidae
- Genus: Podiceps
- Species: †P. discors

Binomial name
- †Podiceps discors Murray, 1967

Extinct species of grebe

Podiceps discors is an extinct species of grebe from the Upper Pliocene of western North America. It was similar to the black-necked grebe.

== History ==
The specimens were collected in the summer of 1951 from Kansas, United States by Claude W. Hibbard and the species was named in 1967 by Bertram G. Murray. The species name "discors" refers to how different it is from other members of Podiceps.

== Description ==
The holotype (UMMP 29079) is a complete left tarsometatarsus, which is comparable in size to tarsometatarsi of the black-necked grebe and of the females of the horned grebe (P. auritus). It differs from them by its internal condyle is not internally flared, and the head is small relative to the length of the bone. Further when viewed at the medial perspective, the tarsometatarsus of P. discors is not as long or it is directed so far anteriorly as seen in other species of the genus. Additional material has been found in Idaho which represent a complete femur (UMMP 52423), an almost complete carpometacarpus (UMMP 49653), three coracoids (UMMP 49590, UMMP 52277, and UMMP 52585), two scapulae (UMMP 45289 and UMMP 49589) and two distal end fragments of two tibiotarsi (UMMP 52432 and 52448). They are all similar to those of the same bone elements in the black-necked grebe with some overlap, though the bones are more slender in form by comparison.

A femur from California (SDSNH 23836) has been recovered that is identical to UMMP 52423.

== Paleobiology ==
P. discors remains have been found in three formations, the Rexroad Formation, Glenns Ferry Formation and the San Diego Formation, all dating to the Piacenzian. This suggests this species was widely distributed in western North America which would have been similar to the range of the black-necked grebe.
