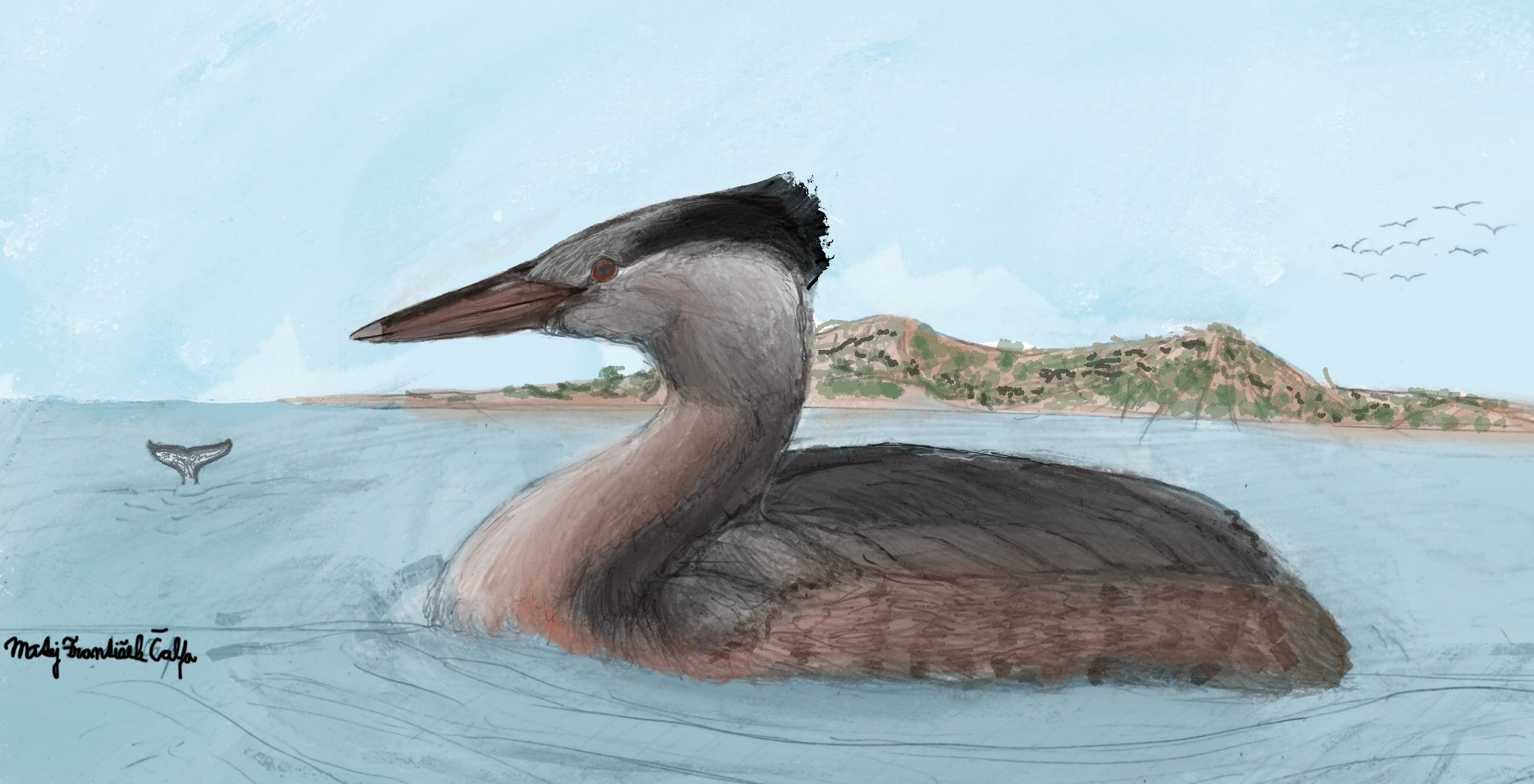
- Life reconstruction

Scientific classification
- Domain: Eukaryota
- Kingdom: Animalia
- Phylum: Chordata
- Class: Aves
- Order: Podicipediformes
- Family: Podicipedidae
- Genus: Podiceps
- Species: †P. miocenicus

Binomial name
- †Podiceps miocenicus Kessler, 1984

= Podiceps miocenicus =

Podiceps miocenicus Temporal range: Tortonian

Extinct species of grebe

Podiceps miocenicus is an extinct species of large Late Miocene grebe from Moldova.

== History ==
The species was found at Chișinău as part of fossil collecting survey in the aforementioned place, as well as Bujorul and Kalfa starting with 1974. The species was described by Eugene Kessler in 1984. The species name "miocenicus" refers to the Miocene age of the grebe.

== Description ==
The holotype and only specimen (LPUI 61-MS) is a right humerus broken into two fragmentary pieces. The two pieces are a proximal epiphysis with diaphysis and a distal epiphysis. The overall form and dimensions are similar to the humeri of the great crested grebe (P. cristatus) but are slightly larger. In comparison to available humeri from other Neogene fossil grebes recovered from Eurasia, P. miocenicus is the largest.

== Paleobiology ==
P. miocenicus comes from the Tortonian age of the Miocene epoch. During this point in Earth's history much of Central Europe was covered by a large, shallow inland sea known as the Paratethys. P. miocenicus would have been contemporary with various seabird and marine mammals whose fossil remains have been heavily documented.
