= Tatria =

Scientific classification
- Kingdom: Animalia
- Phylum: Platyhelminthes
- Class: Cestoda
- Order: Cyclophyllidea
- Family: Amabiliidae
- Genus: Tatria; Kowalewski, 1904

Genus of flatworms

Tatria is a genus of tapeworms in the family Amabiliidae. It contains at least 15 known species and is the largest genus in the Amabiliidae family.

== Species ==
- Tatria acanthorhyncha (Wedl, 1855) Kowalewski, 1904
- Tatria appendiculata Fuhrmann, 1913
- Tatria azerbaijanica Matevosyan & Sailov, 1963
- Tatria biremis Kowalewski, 1904
- Tatria duodecacantha Olsen, 1939
- Tatria fimbriata Borgarenko, Spasskaya & Spasskii, 1972
- Tatria fuhrmanni Solomon, 1932
- Tatria gulyaevi Vasileva, Gibson & Bray, 2003
- Tatria incognita Spassky, 1992
- Tatria iunii Korpaczewska & Sulgostowska, 1974
- Tatria jubilaea Okorokov & Tkachev, 1973
- Tatria mathevossianae Okorokov, 1956
- Tatria minor Kowalewski, 1904
- Tatria octacantha Rees, 1973
- Tatria skrjabini Tretiakova, 1948
