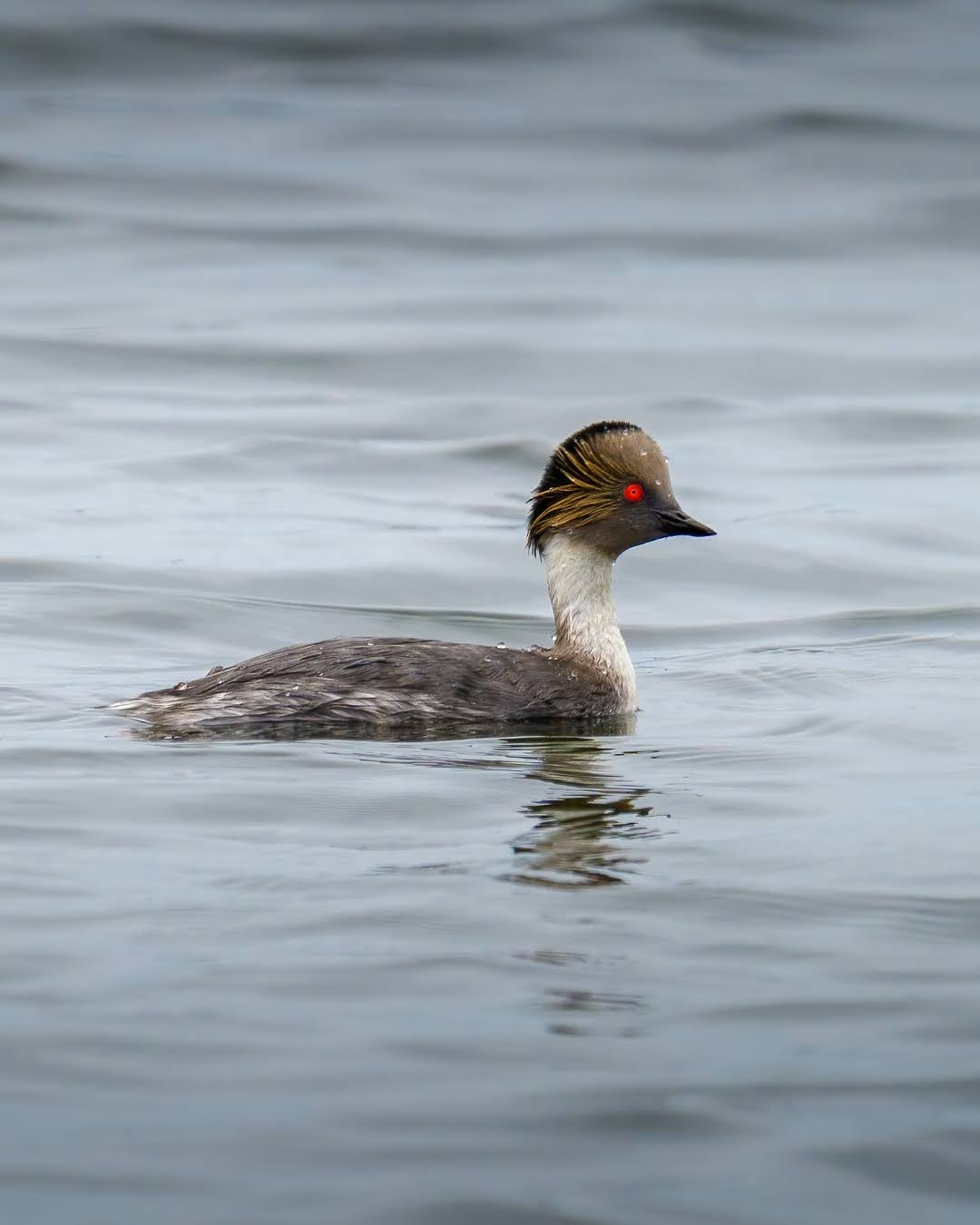

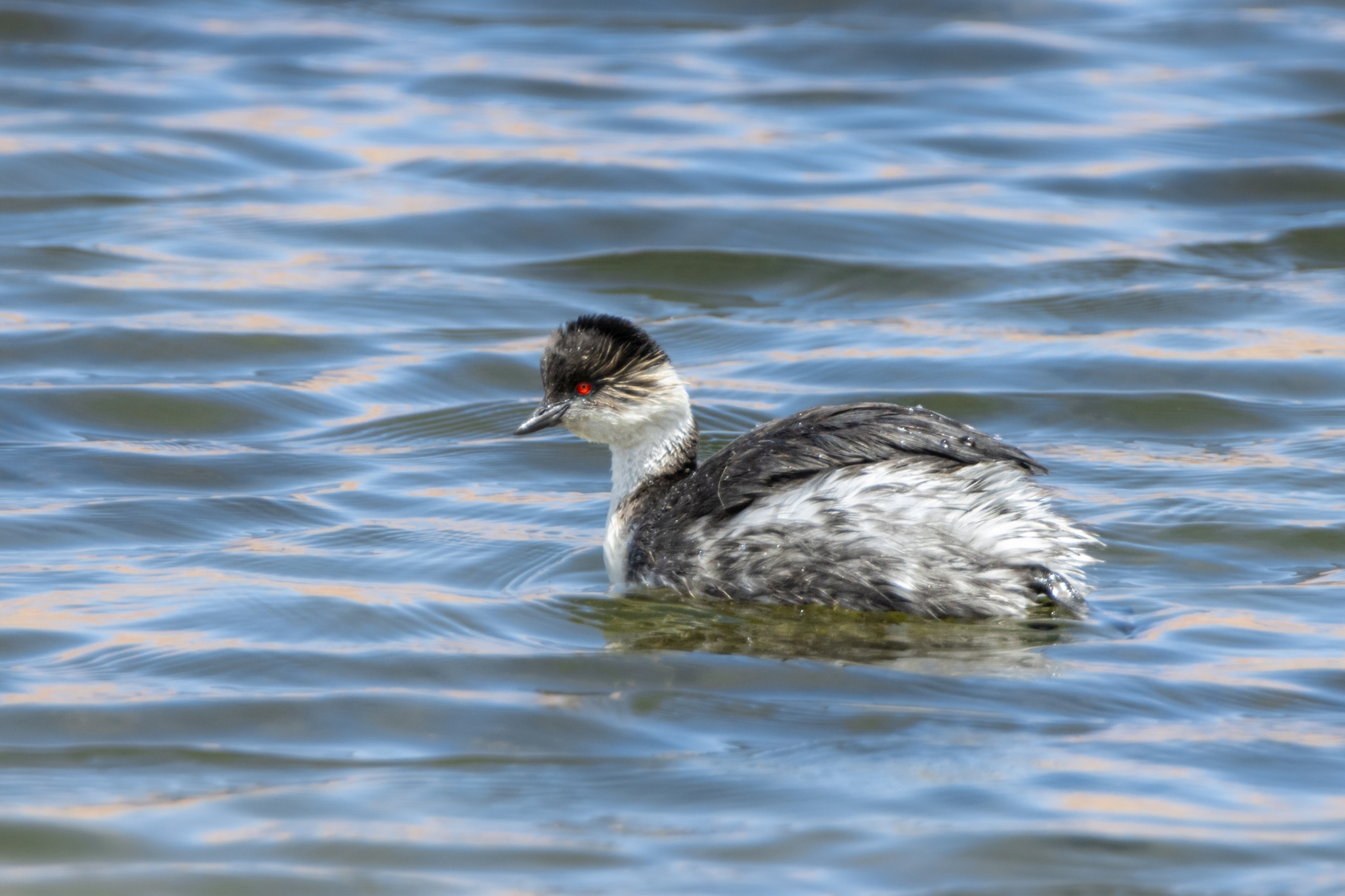
- Southern silvery grebe (top), Northern silvery grebe (bottom)

Conservation status
- Least Concern (IUCN 3.1); Southern silvery grebe

- Near Threatened (IUCN 3.1); Northern silvery grebe

Scientific classification
- Kingdom: Animalia
- Phylum: Chordata
- Class: Aves
- Order: Podicipediformes
- Family: Podicipedidae
- Genus: Podiceps
- Species: P. occipitalis

Binomial name
- Podiceps occipitalis Garnot, 1826
- Range of southern silvery grebe (not including northern silvery grebe, see text)

= Silvery grebe =

Species of bird

The silvery grebe (Podiceps occipitalis) is a species of grebe in the family Podicipedidae. It is found in the western and southern part of South America where it inhabits lakes and other types of open wetlands. There are two subspecies, which by some recent authorities are considered separate species.

== Taxonomy and subspecies ==
There are two subspecies, although some authorities such as the IUCN recognizes them as separate species:

- Northern silvery grebe, P. o. juninensis, (von Berlepsch & Stolzmann, 1894) – Andean highlands at altitudes of 3,000–5,000 m (9,800–16,400 ft) from Colombia to north-west Argentina and northern Chile.
- Southern silvery grebe, P. o. occipitalis, (Garnot, 1826) – at altitudes up to 1,500 m (4,900 ft) in central & southern parts of Chile and Argentina, and in the Falkland Islands. Partially migratory, with wintering range as far north as southern Brazil, southern Bolivia and Paraguay.

== Description ==
The silvery grebe is about 28 cm (11 in) in length. There are two different subspecies which differ in the colouring on their head and facial plumes. In the southern form, the ear plumes are yellowish and the side of the head and throat are grey. In the northern form, the ear plumes are grey and the side of the head and throat are white. Both have a crown that is black and the neck, chest and belly are white while the back is dark grey and the sides and flanks blackish. The beak and feet are black and the eye red. The northern form in particular is similar in appearance to the rare and highly localized Junin grebe (Podiceps taczanowskii), and their ranges overlap.

== Distribution and habitat ==
The silvery grebe nests in Argentina, the Falkland Islands, Chile, and the western parts of Bolivia, Peru, Ecuador and Colombia. The southern silvery grebe is migratory, in winter ranging north to Paraguay, southern Bolivia and southern Brazil and possibly also in Uruguay. Its habitat is freshwater lakes, lagoons, reservoirs and ponds. In the Andes it tends to have a preference for weakly alkaline lakes and is sometimes found foraging on hypersaline lakes. In Patagonia, it sometimes inhabits saline lakes where it can be found in the company of flamingoes.

== Biology ==
The silvery grebe is found in small groups and feeds on aquatic invertebrates which it catches while diving under the water. Its diet includes adults and larvae of caddisflies, water beetles, chironomid midges and water boatmen.

The silvery grebe tends to breed in colonies on lakes. The nest is often composed of floating mats of vegetation. Nesting has been recorded in February in Colombia and between September and March in Peru with most eggs being laid between November and January.

== Status ==
The IUCN recognizes the southern and the northern silvery grebes as separate species, with the former being considered Least Concern and the latter Near Threatened. Both have large ranges, but their populations are declining. This is primarily due to habitat loss, but also hunting and introduced species.
