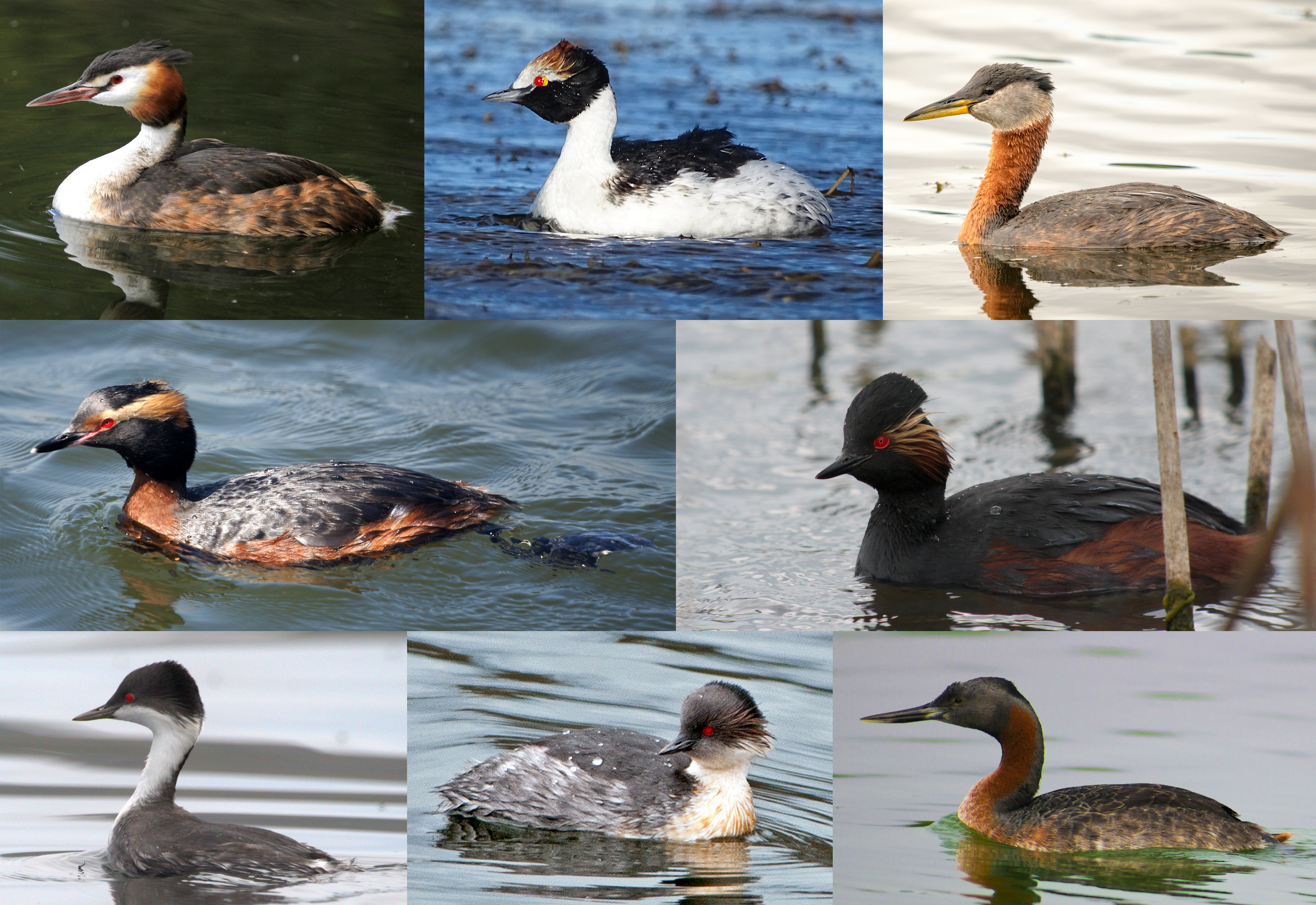
- Montage of eight species, featuring from left to right in three rows: P. cristatus, P. gallardoi, P. grisegena; P. auritus, P. nigricollis; P. taczanowskii, P. occipitalis, P. major.

Scientific classification
- Kingdom: Animalia
- Phylum: Chordata
- Class: Aves
- Order: Podicipediformes
- Family: Podicipedidae
- Tribe: Podicipedini
- Genus: Podiceps; Latham, 1787

Type species
- Colymbus cristatus Linnaeus, 1758

Species
- See text.

Synonyms
- Pliodytes Brodkorb 1953; Dyas; Lophaithyia Kaup 1829; Colymbus Linnaeus 1758 non Linnaeus 1766 non Paetel 1875 non Hadding 1913; Podiceps (Proctopus) Kaup.; Centropelma Sclater & Salvin 1869; Dytes Kaup.; Podicephorus Bochenski 1994

= Podiceps =

Podiceps Temporal range: Aquitanian to present

Genus of birds

Podiceps is a genus of birds in the grebe family. The genus name comes from Latin podicis, "rear-end" and ped, "foot", and is a reference to the placement of a grebe's legs towards the rear of its body.

It has representatives breeding in all continents except Antarctica. Some species are partially or entirely migratory, moving in winter to the coast or warmer climates. Most species are widespread and overall common, but three South American species each are restricted to a single country; two of them are seriously threatened and a third is already extinct.

They breed in vegetated areas of freshwater lakes, nesting on the water's edge, since their legs are set too far back for easy walking. Usually two eggs are laid, and the striped young may be carried on the adult's back. All the genus are excellent swimmers and divers, and pursue their fish prey underwater. Adults have striking breeding plumage, with no difference between the sexes. In winter, the plumage is subdued whites and greys.

== Systematics ==
The genus Podiceps was erected by the English naturalist John Latham in 1787. The type species was subsequently designated as the great crested grebe (Podiceps cristatus). The genus name combines variants on the Latin podex, roughly meaning "rear-end", and pes, meaning "foot".

The black-necked, Colombian, silvery, and Junin grebes are very closely related and were formerly sometimes separated as the genus Dyas. The great grebe has also sometimes been separated as the sole member of the genus Podicephorus; there is also genetic evidence that it is more closely related to the Aechmophorus grebes than it is to the rest of the genus Podiceps.

The genus contains nine species:

Genus Podiceps – Latham, 1787 – nine species
Common name	Scientific name and subspecies	Range	Size and ecology	IUCN status and estimated population
Great grebe	Podiceps major (Boddaert, 1783) Two subspecies: P. m. major (Boddaert, 1783); P. m. navasi (Manghi, 1984)	Western and southern South America	Size: Habitat: Diet:	LC
Red-necked grebe	Podiceps grisegena (Boddaert, 1783) Two subspecies: P. g. grisegena (Boddaert, 1783); P. g. holbollii Reinhardt, 1853	Eurasia and North America	Size: Habitat: Diet:	LC
Great crested grebe	Podiceps cristatus (Linnaeus, 1758) Three subspecies: P. c. cristatus (Linnaeus, 1758); P. c. infuscatus Salvadori, 1884; P. c. australis Gould, 1844	Australasian, Eurasia and Africa	Size: Habitat: Diet:	LC
Horned grebe or Slavonian grebe (breeding plumage) (non-breeding plumage)	Podiceps auritus (Linnaeus, 1758) Two subspecies: P. a. auritus (Linnaeus, 1758); P. a. cornutus (J. F. Gmelin, 1789)	Eurasia and North America	Size: Habitat: Diet:	VU
Black-necked grebe or eared grebe	Podiceps nigricollis (Brehm, 1831) Three subspecies: P. n. nigricollis – (C. L. Brehm, 1831); P. n. gurneyi – (Roberts, 1919); P. n. californicus – (Heermann, 1854)	Eurasia, Africa and North America	Size: Habitat: Diet:	LC
†Colombian grebe	Podiceps andinus (Meyer de Schauensee, 1959)	Colombia - extinct (1977)	Size: Habitat: Diet:	EX
Silvery grebe	Podiceps occipitalis (Garnot, 1826) Two subspecies: P. o. juninensis (von Berlepsch & Stolzmann, 1894); P. o. occipitalis (Garnot, 1826)	Western and southern South America, and the Falkland Islands.	Size: Habitat: Diet:	LC
Junin grebe	Podiceps taczanowskii (Berlepsch & Stolzmann, 1894)	west-central Peru	Size: Habitat: Diet:	EN
Hooded grebe	Podiceps gallardoi Rumboll, 1974	south-west Argentina	Size: Habitat: Diet:	CR

The chicks of all Podiceps grebes (including P. major, but not those of the related genus Aechmophorus) have boldly striped heads, with alternating black and white stripes; they are often colloquially called "humbugs" from their resemblance to humbug sweets. They lose these markings as they mature during their first winter.

=== Fossils ===
One of the very oldest fossil grebes known to date actually belongs to this genus. Regarding grebes, the fossil record leaves much to be desired, being quite complete for the last 5 million years before present but very incomplete before the Pliocene.

Fossil species of Podiceps are:

- †Podiceps arndti Chandler, 1990 (Piacenzian stage of North America)
- †Podiceps csarnotanus Kessler, 2009 (Piacenzian stage of Europe)
- †Podiceps discors Murray, 1967 (Piacenzian stage of North America)
- †Podiceps dixi Brodkorp, 1963 (Chibanian to the Tarantian stages of Florida, United States)
- †Podiceps howardae Storer, 2001 (Zanclean age of North Carolina, United States)
- †Podiceps miocenicus Kessler, 1984 (Tortonian age of Moldova)
- †Podiceps oligoceanus (Shufeldt, 1915) (Aquitanian age of North America)
- †Podiceps parvus (Shufeldt, 1913) (Gelasian to the Calabrian stages of North America)
- †Podiceps pisanus (Shufeldt, 1913) (Piacenzian stage of Italy)
- †Podiceps solidus Kuročkin, 1985 (Zanclean age of Western Mongolia)
- †Podiceps subparvus (Miller & Bowman, 1958)
- Podiceps? sp. (Late Pliocene of WC USA)
- Podiceps sp. (Early Pleistocene of Dursunlu, Turkey)

Among the material assigned to P. parvus were bones of another species, which may or may not belong in this genus.
