= Robert Wilson Shufeldt =

American osteologist and white supremacist (1850–1934)

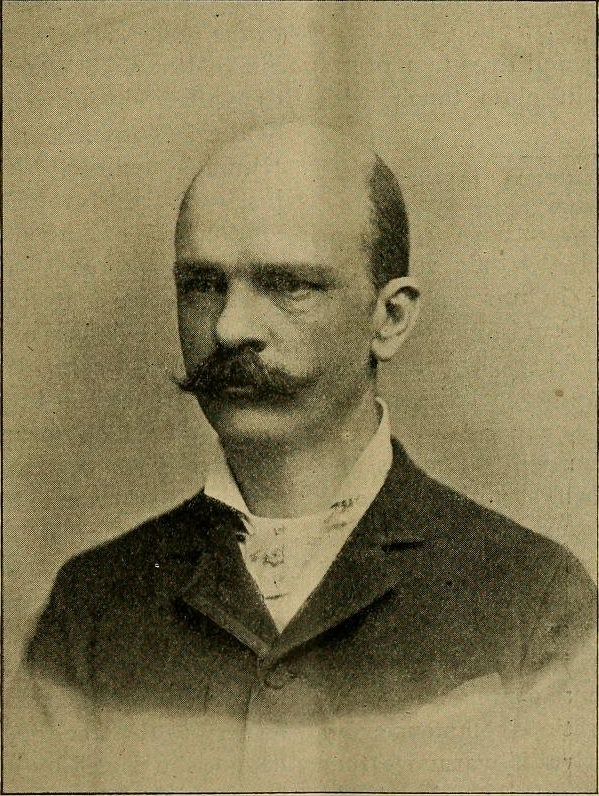
- Portrait accompanying a profile in The Nidiologist (1893)
- Born: December 1, 1850; New York City, US
- Died: January 21, 1934 (aged 83); Washington, D.C., US
- Burial place: Arlington National Cemetery

Signature
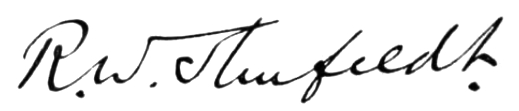

Robert Wilson Shufeldt Jr. (December 1, 1850 – January 21, 1934) was an American osteologist, myologist, museologist and ethnographer who contributed to comparative studies of bird anatomy and forensic science. He considered black people as a problem for America and was a proponent of white supremacy and scientific racism. A scandal and subsequent divorce from his second wife, the granddaughter of the famous ornithologist John James Audubon, whom he ostensibly "studied" as an example of a mulatto, led to a landmark judgment by the Supreme Court of the United States of America on the subject of alimony and bankruptcy.

== Life and career ==
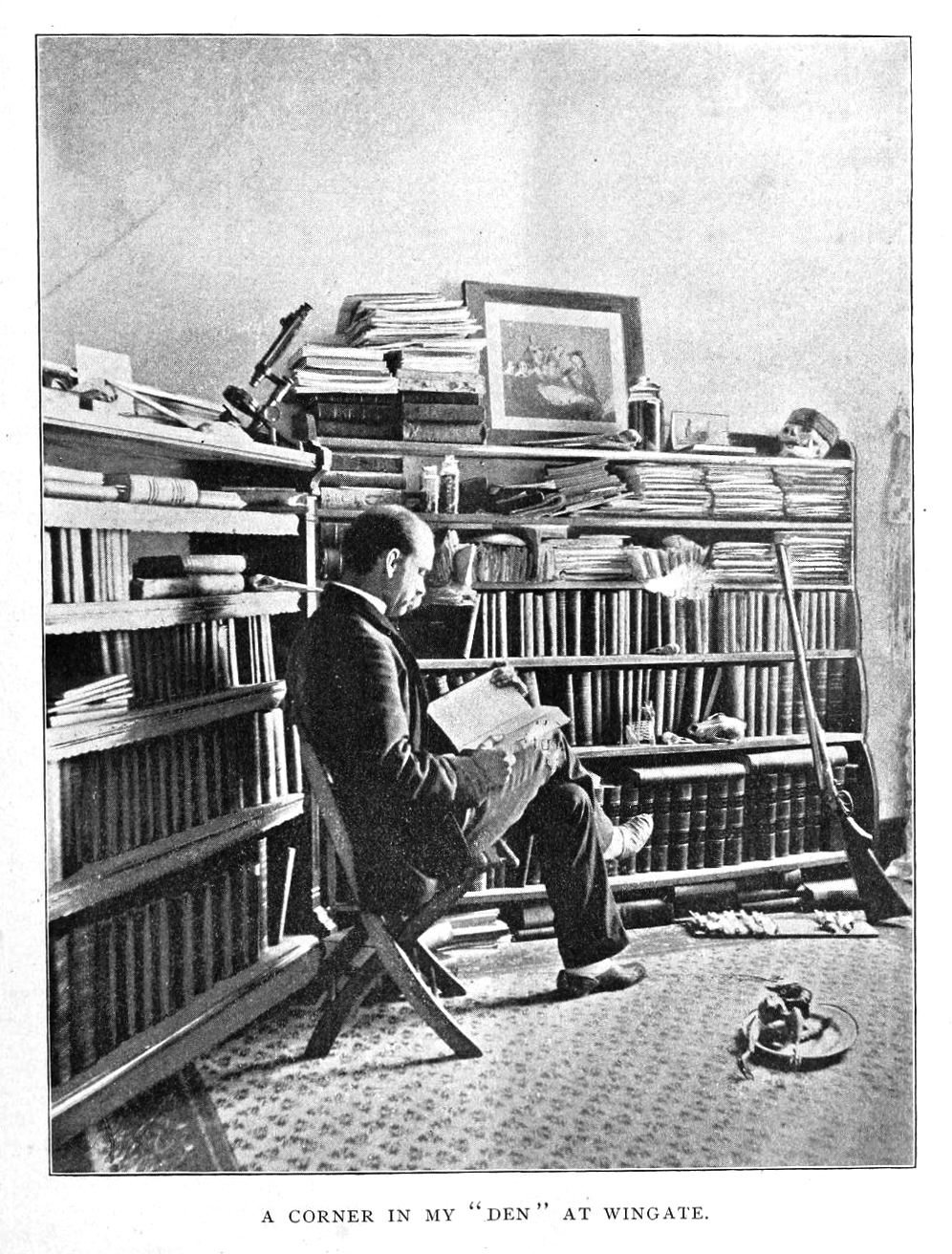
Shufeldt in his study at Fort Wingate, c. 1885

Son of Admiral Robert Wilson Shufeldt and Sarah Shufeldt, he was born in New York in 1850. After a school education in the United States and Havana, he joined as a Captain's clerk on the US Gunboat USS Proteus which was under the command of his father. A younger brother Mason Abercrombie Shufeldt (1852– died in Cape Town, 1892) also joined the navy. In 1872 Robert joined Cornell University to study medicine and obtained a degree in 1876 from Columbian, Washington, D.C. He joined the Medical Department of the Army as a Lieutenant and was posted to Fort McHenry. He later worked as a surgeon in the campaign against the Sioux Indians. He was a founding member of the Entomological Society of Washington in 1884. From 1884 to 1888 he was stationed at Fort Wingate in New Mexico, collecting in the Zuni Mountains and nearby regions. He retired in 1891 from the army as a Captain but was readmitted and posted on duty in the Army Medical Museum as a curator in 1892. Shufeldt was advanced to Major on April 23, 1904. He retired on January 9, 1919, as a surgeon.

== Scientific contributions ==
Shufeldt's scientific interests began during his years in surgical practice. He had made zoological and botanical collections and had published extensively on osteology. He became an honorary curator at the Smithsonian Institution in 1882 and held it until 1892.

He published as many as 1,100 notes and books, often on natural history but specializing in anatomy and systematics of birds which included a study of the last passenger pigeon. He had an interest in fossil birds and contributed to Alfred Newton's A Dictionary of Birds (1893–1896). He is credited with coining the word "paleopathology", the study of diseases and cause of death of decomposed specimens. He also took a great interest in the field of photography, using it to document birds as well as human anatomy. He published a report on taxidermy and a book Studies of the human form for artists, sculptors and scientists (1908) which included many nude photographs. He was also a collector of skeletons and was known to have dug up the graves of many Indian tribes.

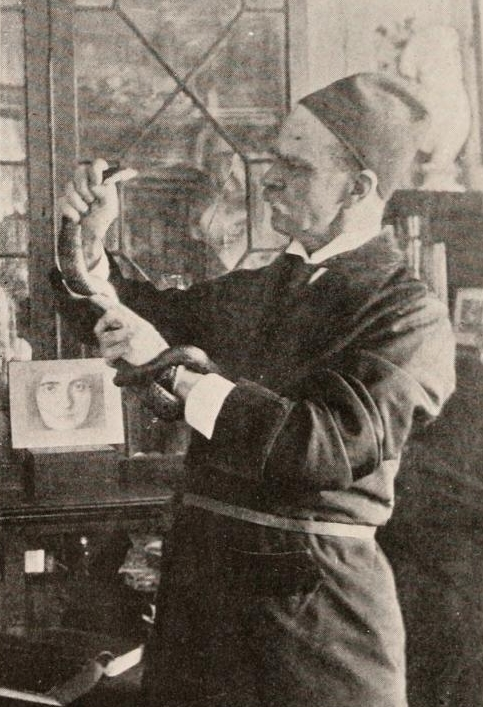
Examining a snake, c. 1910

Shufeldt brought the work of Gerhard Heilmann, written in Danish, to the attention of American researchers.

== Personal life ==
Shufeldt married three times, first to Catherine Babcock, then to Florence Audubon (granddaughter of John James Audubon) before marrying Alfhild Dagny Lowum, a Norwegian. The first wife Catherine committed suicide in an asylum. His second wife, Florence Audubon, left him after two months of marriage, accusing him of adultery. Florence sought divorce on the grounds that Robert was having an affair with their Norwegian housekeeper, who would later become his third wife. Around this time he published a pamphlet titled On Female Impotency which included a photograph of a nude woman who he described as a mulatto but likely Ms. Audubon. This paper describing his personal problems, thinly veiled as medical research and meant to blackmail Florence, stated his affiliation to the Smithsonian Institution which outraged the Smithsonian leadership and led to his dismissal in 1897. Shufeldt refused to pay alimony following the divorce and claimed bankruptcy which was taken up in the US Supreme Court Audubon v. Shufeldt, 181 US 575 (1901). He took back many of the specimens that he had collected for the Smithsonian and later deposited them with the New York State Museum. Other organizations like the AOU also attempted to distance themselves due to the potential for scandal and shame.

Shufeldt had two sons from his first wife Catherine. Robert (1877–1892), who was interested in ornithology, died while collecting specimens for Marietta College. Family oral history, however, called this a hazing incident. Percy (1879–1949) briefly attended Marietta College as well, and became a successful harvester and trader of chicle. A daughter, Catherine, died of diphtheria in childhood. A foster daughter was listed in the 1881 census as a nurse.

Shufeldt died at his home in Dupont Circle, Washington, D.C., on January 21, 1934. He and his wife Alfhild Dagny Lowum (1871–1934) are buried at Arlington National Cemetery.
