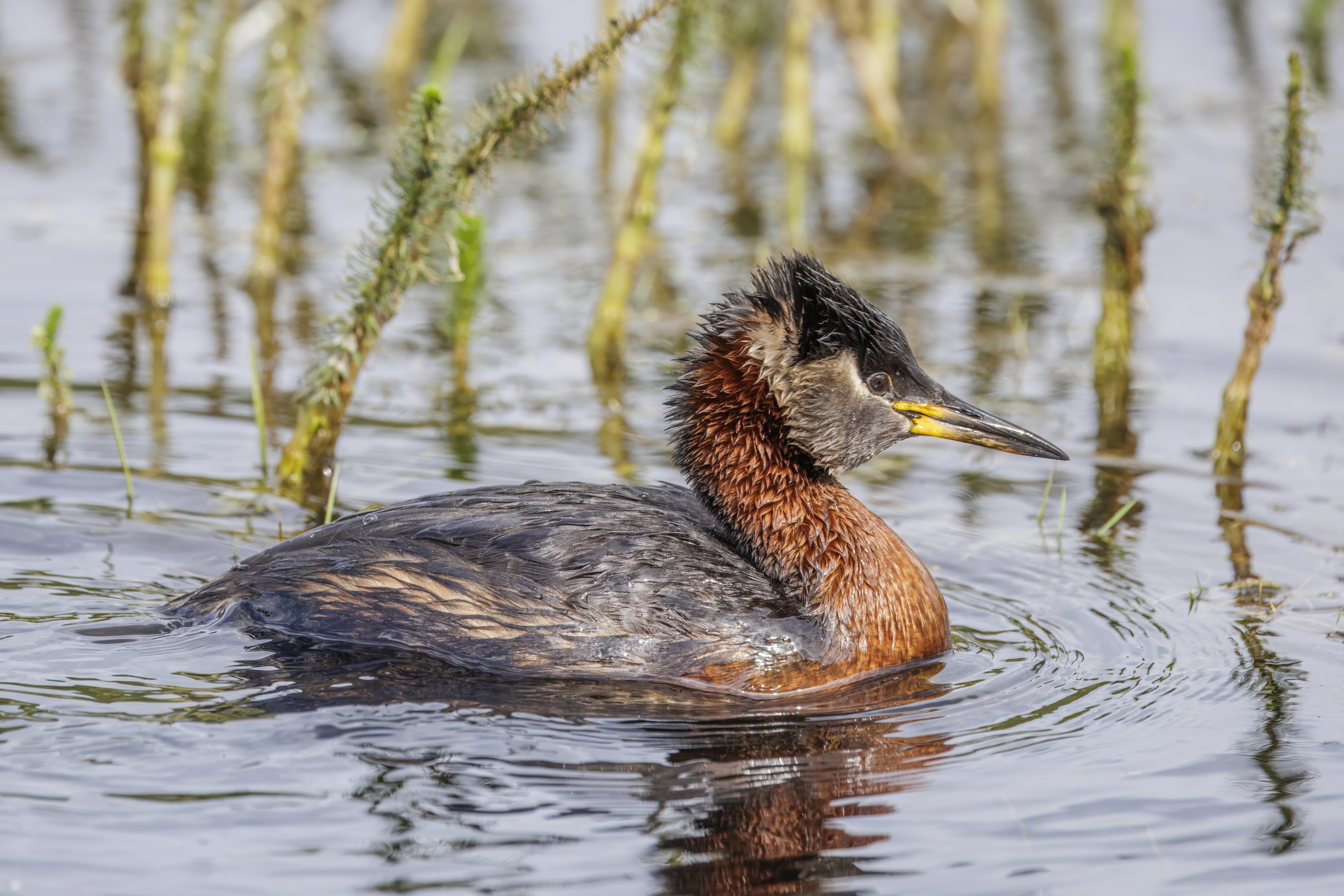
- Breeding plumage
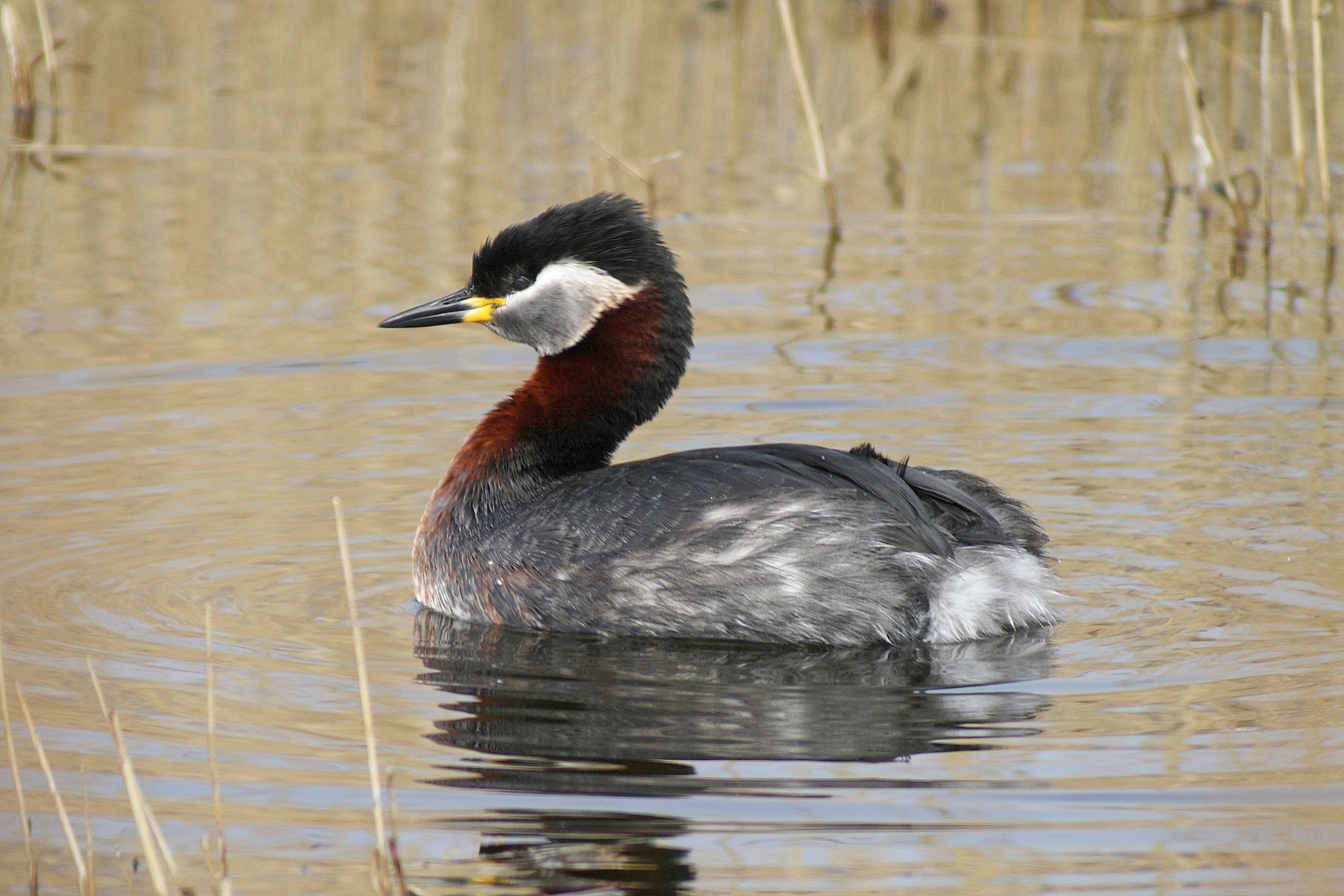
- Non-breeeding plumage Both P. g. grisegena, Denmark

Conservation status
- Least Concern (IUCN 3.1)

Scientific classification
- Kingdom: Animalia
- Phylum: Chordata
- Class: Aves
- Order: Podicipediformes
- Family: Podicipedidae
- Genus: Podiceps
- Species: P. grisegena

Binomial name
- Podiceps grisegena (Boddaert, 1783)
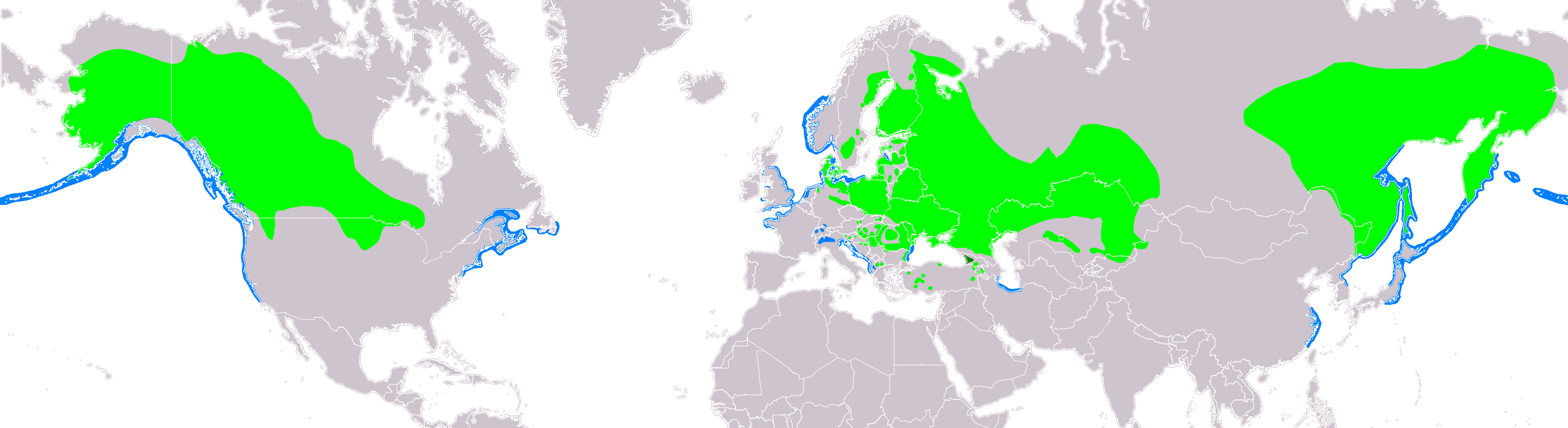
- Range of P. grisegena Breeding Resident Non-breeding

Synonyms
- Podiceps griseigena (Lapsus)

= Red-necked grebe =

Species of migratory aquatic bird

The red-necked grebe (Podiceps grisegena) is an aquatic bird found in the temperate regions of the northern hemisphere. A migratory bird, its wintering habitat is largely restricted to calm waters just beyond the waves around ocean coasts, although some birds may winter on large lakes. Grebes prefer shallow bodies of fresh water such as lakes, marshes or fish-ponds as breeding sites.

The red-necked grebe is a fairly drab dusky-grey bird in winter. During the breeding season, it acquires the distinctive red neck plumage, black cap and contrasting pale grey face from which its name was derived. It also has an elaborate courtship display and a variety of loud mating calls. Once paired, it builds a nest from water plants on top of floating vegetation in a shallow lake or bog.

Like all grebes, the red-necked is a good swimmer and particularly swift diver, and responds to danger by diving rather than flying. The feet are positioned far back on the body, near the tail, which makes the bird ungainly on land. It dives for fish or picks insects off vegetation; it also swallows its own feathers, possibly to protect the digestive system. The conservation status of its two subspecies, P. g. grisegena, found in Europe and western Asia, and the larger P. g. holbolii (sometimes called Holbøll's grebe), found in North America and eastern Siberia, is evaluated as Least Concern, and the global population is stable or growing.

== Taxonomy ==
The red-necked grebe was described by the French polymath Georges-Louis Leclerc, Comte de Buffon in 1781 in his Histoire Naturelle des Oiseaux. The bird was also illustrated in a hand-coloured plate engraved by François-Nicolas Martinet in the Planches Enluminées D'Histoire Naturelle which was produced under the supervision of Edme-Louis Daubenton to accompany Buffon's text. Neither the plate caption nor Buffon's description included a scientific name but in 1783 the Dutch naturalist Pieter Boddaert coined the binomial name Colymbus grisegena in his catalogue of the Planches Enluminées. The type locality was subsequently designated as France. The red-necked grebe is now placed in the genus Podiceps that was described by the English naturalist John Latham in 1787. The genus name Podiceps comes from Latin podicis, "vent" or "anus", and pes, "foot", and is a reference to the placement of a grebe's legs towards the rear of its body. The species name grisegena is from Latin griseus (grey) and gena (cheek) and refers to the grey cheeks of the breeding adult.

Grebes are small to medium-large water birds with lobed, rather than webbed, toes. There are several genera, of which the most widespread is Podiceps with nine species, one recently extinct. The closest relative of the red-necked grebe is the fish-eating great crested grebe of Europe and western Asia. It is possible that the red-necked grebe originally evolved in North America and later spread to Europe, where a change of diet to include more insects helped to reduce competition with its larger cousin. Fossils of the species dating to the middle Pleistocene have been found in Italy.

== Description ==
The red-necked grebe is a medium-large grebe, smaller than the great crested grebe of Eurasia, and the western and Clark's grebes of North America, but noticeably larger than other northern grebe species. In breeding plumage, it has a black cap that extends below the eye, very pale grey cheeks and throat, a rusty red neck, dark grey back and flanks, and white underparts. The eyes are dark brown and the long, pointed bill is black with a yellow base.

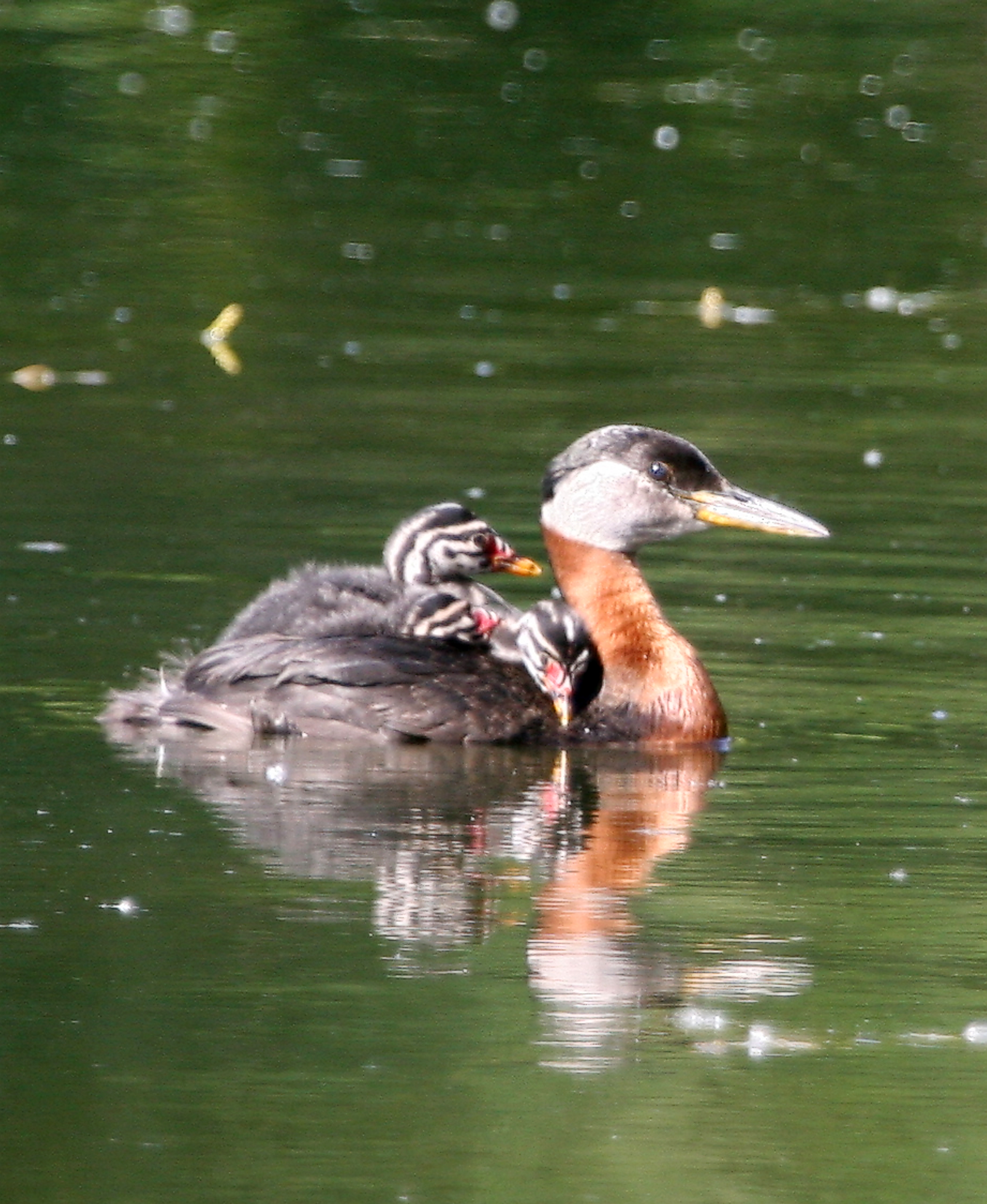
Adult of American subspecies with chicks

The winter plumage of the red-necked grebe is duskier than that of other grebes; its dark grey cap is less defined, and merges into the grey face, and a pale crescent that curves around the rear of the face contrasts with the rest of the head. The front of the neck is whitish or light grey, the hind neck is darker grey, and the yellow of the bill is less obvious than in summer. Although the red-necked grebe is unmistakable in breeding plumage, it is less distinctive in winter and can be confused with similar species. It is larger than the Slavonian (horned) grebe, with a relatively larger bill and a grey, rather than white face. It is closer in size to the Eurasian great crested grebe, but that species is longer-necked, has a more contrasting head pattern, and always shows white above the eye.

The sexes are similar in appearance, although the male averages heavier than the female. Chicks have a striped head and breast, and older juveniles have a striped face, diffuse blackish cap, pale red neck and extensive yellow on the bill.

The red-necked grebe flies with its long neck extended and its large feet trailing behind the body, which gives it a stretched-out appearance. The relatively small wings are grey with white secondaries, and beat very rapidly. Its small wing area means that the grebe is unable to take off from land, and needs a lengthy run across water to gain the speed needed for take-off. Like all grebes, the red-necked is an expert swimmer; it uses its feet for propulsion underwater, and steers by rotating its legs, since its tail is too short for this purpose.

This is one of the most vocal grebes during the breeding season, but, like its relatives, it is mainly silent for the rest of the year. It has a loud, wailing or howling display call uooooh, given by a single bird or a pair in duet, by night or during the day, and often from cover. Long sequences of up to 60 consecutive notes may be delivered during singing encounters between rival territorial birds. A great variety of quacking, clucking, hissing, rattling and purring calls are also given, with much individual variation.

=== Subspecies ===
There are currently two accepted subspecies:

Summer	Winter	Scientific name	Common name	Distribution	Notes
Amager, Denmark	Lisvane Reservoir, Cardiff, Wales	P. g. grisegena Boddaert, 1783	European red-necked grebe	Across northern and eastern Europe from Denmark south to the Black Sea (and locally in Turkey) and east to central Asia in Kazakhstan; wintering further southwest to eastern Britain and northern France, and south to the central and eastern Mediterranean, the Caspian Sea, and larger lakes in southwest Asia.	Nominate subspecies. Smaller, 40–50 cm (16–20 in) long with a 77–85 cm (30–33 in) average wingspan, and weighs 692–925 g (24.4–32.6 oz). Shorter, weaker bill with less extensive yellow at the base.
Humber Bay Park, Toronto, Canada	Riverlands, St. Louis, Missouri, USA	P. g. holbollii Reinhardt, 1853	American red-necked grebe or Holbøll's grebe	Interior western Canada, Alaska, the far northern United States, and also eastern Asia in eastern Siberia, Korea, and Hokkaido in northern Japan; wintering on the Atlantic coast from Newfoundland south to Massachusetts, and the Pacific coast from southwestern Alaska south to California,	Larger, 43–56 cm (17–22 in) length, with a 61–88 cm (24–35 in) wingspan, and a weight of 750–1,600 g (26–56 oz). Longer, stouter bill with more extensive yellow.

Holbøll's grebe was named after the Danish explorer of Greenlandic birds Carl Peter Holbøll. As Holbøll was Danish, under the International Code of Zoological Nomenclature Article 32.5.2.1, scientific names derived from his name treat the ø/ö as 'o', rather than 'oe' had it been derived from a German name, thus the correct spelling of the subspecies is Podiceps grisegena holbollii, and not "holboellii" as formerly often cited. The east Asian birds are in some aspects intermediate, with slightly smaller bills than the American birds, although the differences are too small to merit separation as a third subspecies. The difference in size between the sexes is slightly larger for this subspecies than for P. g. grisegena.

Transatlantic vagrancy of both subspecies is known, with two records of nominate P. g. grisegena in Greenland, and 12 records of P. g. holbollii in Europe, half of them in Iceland, and the rest shared between Scotland (two), Norway, Sweden, France, and Spain.

== Distribution and habitat ==
Breeding takes place in shallow freshwater lakes, bays of larger lakes, marshes, and other inland bodies of water, often less than 3 ha (7.4 acres) in extent and less than 2 m (6.6 ft) deep. The red-necked grebe shows a preference for waters in forested areas or, further north, in shrub tundra, and favours sites with abundant emergent vegetation, such as reedbeds. The best breeding habitat is fish-ponds, which have an abundance of food in addition to meeting the other requirements. The American subspecies is less tied to a high aquatic plant density, and sometimes breeds on quite open lakes.

All populations are migratory and winter mainly at sea, usually in estuaries and bays, but often well offshore where fish are within diving reach near shallow banks or islands. The preferred passage and wintering habitat is water less than 15 m (49 ft) deep with a sand or gravel bottom, scattered rocks and patches of seaweed. During winter, birds typically feed alone and rarely aggregate into flocks, but on migration, concentrations of over 2000 individuals may occur at favoured staging sites. Migration is usually at night, but may occur during the day, especially when over water. This is particularly noticeable in autumn on the Great Lakes, when up to 18,000 birds may pass Whitefish Point on Lake Superior; these are thought to be Canadian breeders heading for the Atlantic Ocean to winter. This easterly route is longer than that to the Pacific, but avoids the Rockies.

The breeding range of the red-necked grebe overlaps with that of the Slavonian grebe, although the latter species tends to be displaced from sites suited to both. The red-necked grebe prefers an inland temperate climate, and is less successful near coasts and in subarctic and warm temperate zones. It is usually a lowland bird, breeding below 100 m (330 ft), although has nested at up to 1,800 m (5,900 ft) in Turkey.

The nominate subspecies breeds from southern Sweden and Denmark through central and eastern Europe east to western Siberia, and winters mainly in the North and Baltic Seas, with smaller numbers in the Adriatic, Black Sea, Caspian Sea, Mediterranean and on inland lakes. P. g. holbolii breeds in North America in Alaska, western and central Canada, and the northern US east to Minnesota; in Asia it nests in eastern Siberia from Kamchatka south to Hokkaido and west to Mongolia. The Asian birds winter at sea from Japan to the East China Sea, and American breeders winter in the Pacific, mainly from southern Alaska to British Columbia (with smaller numbers south to California), and in the Atlantic from Newfoundland and Labrador to Florida. Some birds remain on the Great Lakes if they are sufficiently ice-free. This species occurs as a rare winter vagrant in Afghanistan, Pakistan , Nepal and parts of northern and western India.

== Behaviour ==
=== Breeding and survival ===
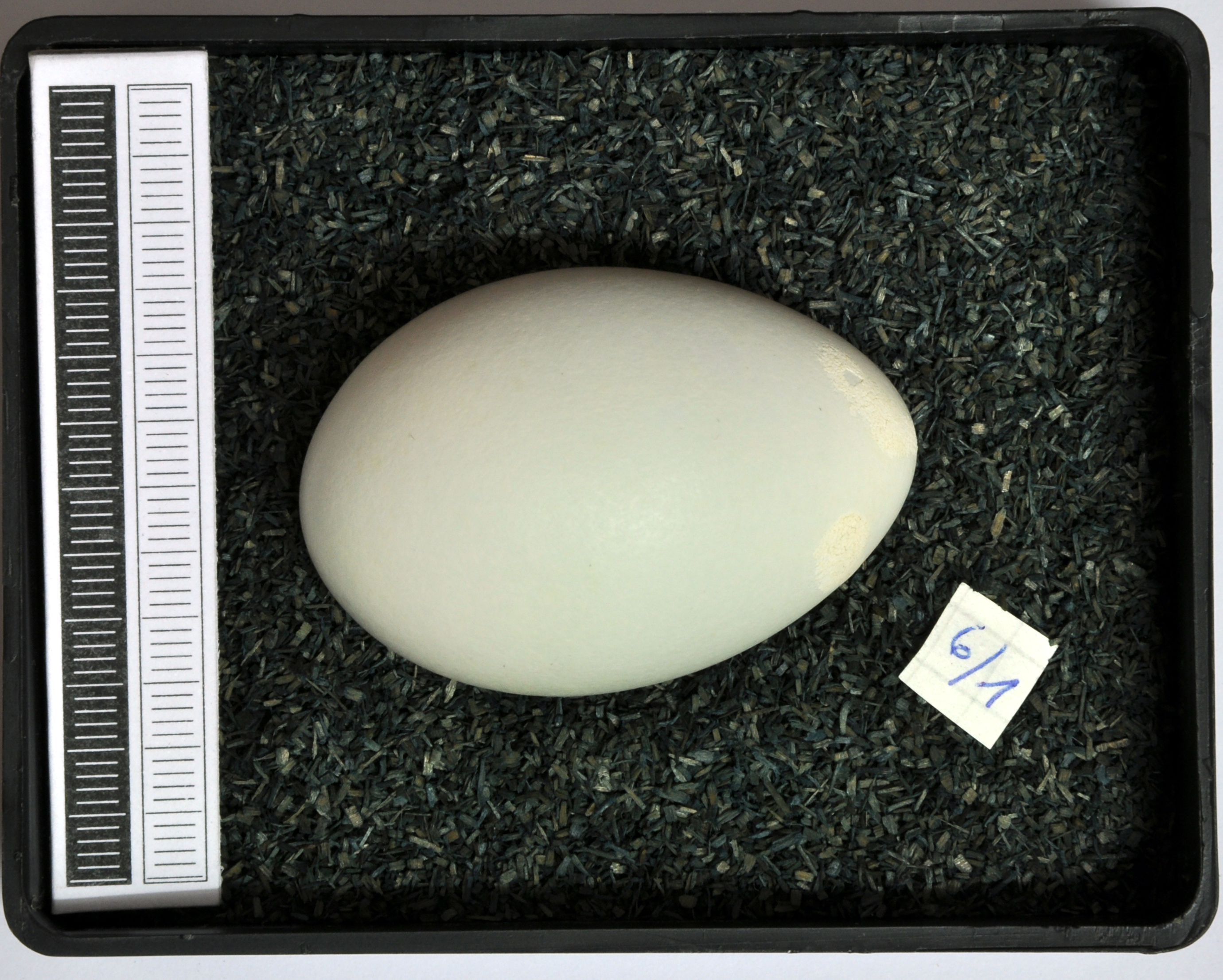
Egg, Collection Museum Wiesbaden, Germany

Red-necked grebes usually nest as isolated pairs with more than 50 m (160 ft) between neighbouring nests, although semi-colonial nesting may occur in suitable sites, where up to 20 pairs each defend a linear territory. Semi-colonial breeding is more likely to occur in prime locations, such as large floating mats of vegetation with no connection to the shoreline. Such sites, safe from most predators and large enough to provide some wind and wave protection, have grebes nesting much closer than shoreline breeders, down to 10 m (33 ft). Pairs nesting in these colonies produce larger clutches of eggs, which hatch earlier in the season and result in larger broods. The territory is defended with various threat displays, including wing-spreading, hunching, and bill-thrusting; pairs breeding in colonies are more aggressive, less likely to leave the nest unguarded and show a greater tendency to move out of sight of the colony when not incubating. Breeding is often in loose association with gulls or other colonial water birds.

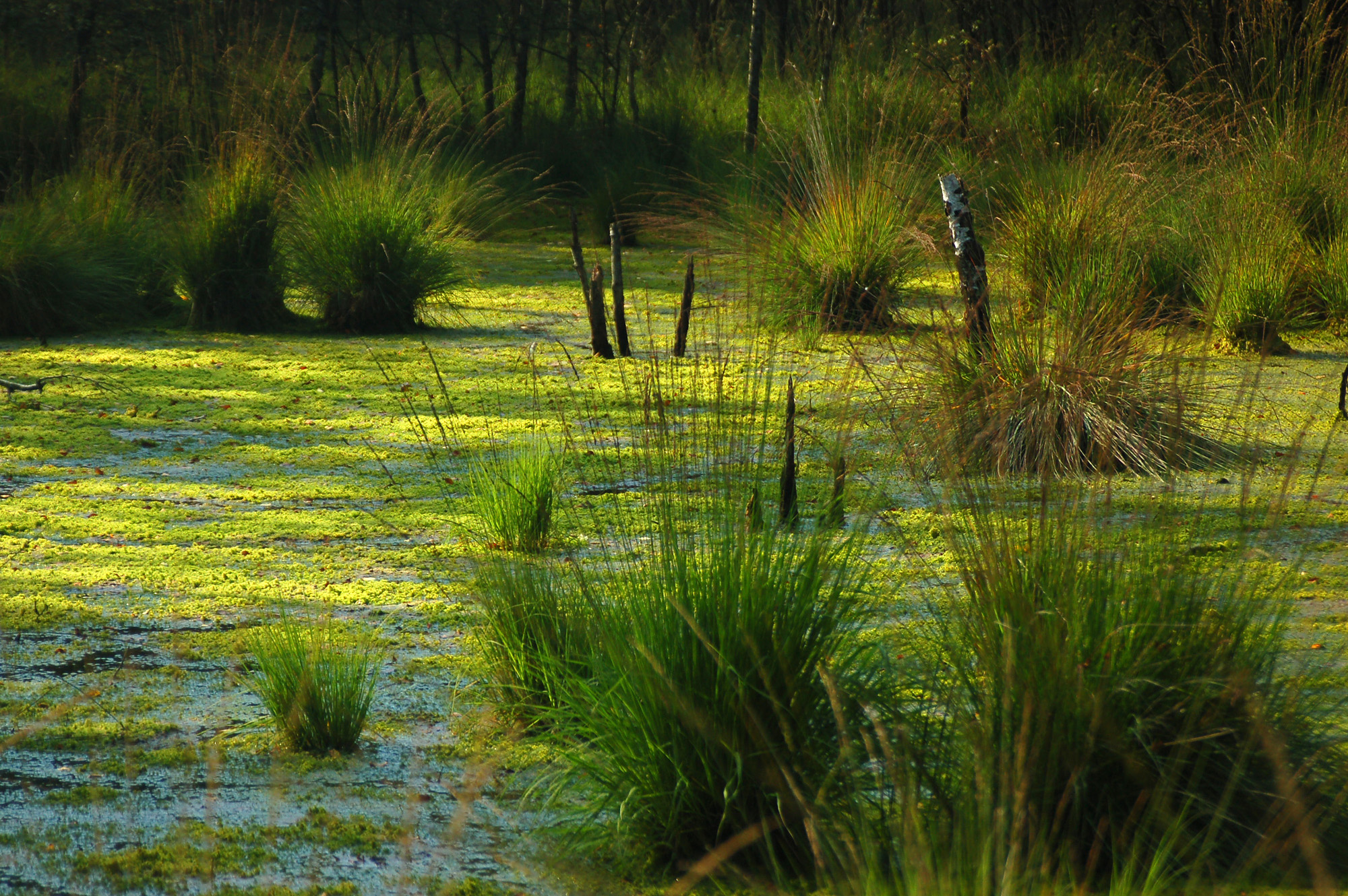
Breeding areas must have emergent vegetation

The monogamous pair forms in April or May on migration or at the breeding water, and a highly vocal courtship ritual commences. The elaborate breeding performance includes head-shaking, a head-lowered "cat" display, parallel rushes in an upright position and mutual presentations of green weeds, and culminates in a "penguin" dance in which pair members raise the whole body upright, breast to breast.

Like all grebes, the red-necked grebe nests near water into which it can escape, since the position of the legs far back on the body prevents fast movement on land. It often breeds further within reed beds than other grebes. The nest is a floating platform of plant matter anchored to submerged or emergent vegetation, in water 0.5–0.75 m (20–30 in) deep, and with the bulk of nest below the water line. Egg-laying mainly takes place from mid-April to May in Europe, and somewhat later, from mid-May to June, in North America. Parents may leave the nest for significant periods of time during the night, possibly to evade nocturnal predators. It is unclear whether this is for self-protection or to protect the eggs by diverting attention from the nest; the clutch does not appear to suffer from this temporary abandonment, whatever the reason.

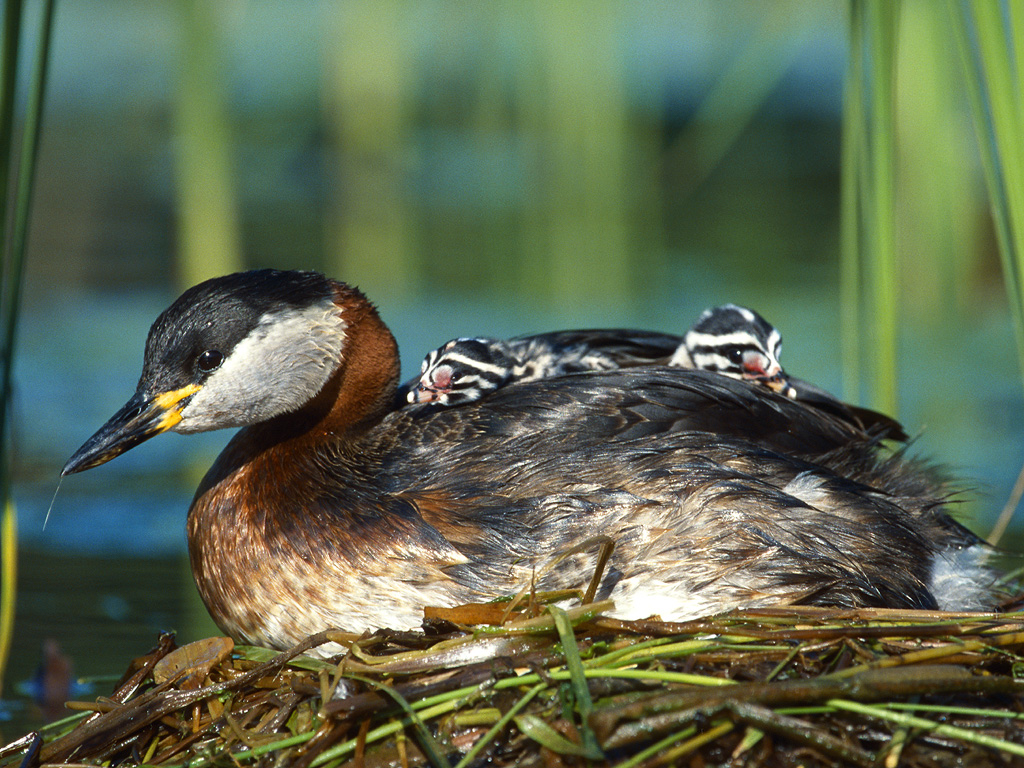
Chicks on a parent's back

The red-necked grebe lays four or five (range one to nine) dull white or pale blue eggs, which average 3.4 cm (1.3 in) in breadth, 5.1 cm (2.0 in) in length, and weigh about 30.5 g (1.08 oz), of which 10% is shell. Parents take turns to incubate the eggs for 21–33 days until the precocial downy chicks hatch; they immediately climb onto the parent's back, where they spend most of their time until they are 10–17 days old. The young may be fed by the parents for up to 54 days after fledging, and can fly at 50–70 days. The parents do not interfere with the feeding of their chicks when they are still being carried. Later they care for the younger chicks for longer, and are aggressive with the older offspring. This equalises the post-fledging survival of all chicks, and encourages their independence. The brood may be split, so that each parent feeds only some of the chicks. This spreads the feeding demand equally between the parents.

After breeding the adults moult their wing feathers and are temporarily flightless; migration commences once the flight feathers have regrown. The red-necked grebe is normally single-brooded, although second broods and re-nesting after a clutch has been lost may extend nesting into July or August.

Eggs may be destroyed and chicks killed by a range of predators, including the raccoon in North America and the carrion crow in Europe. Pike may take swimming chicks. On average, for each adult, 0.65 young birds are still alive by their fourth month, although the mortality rate for the adult is unknown. Red-necked grebes attempt to evade birds of prey by diving; when feeding, dives average less than 30 seconds, although escape dives are more prolonged.

=== Feeding ===
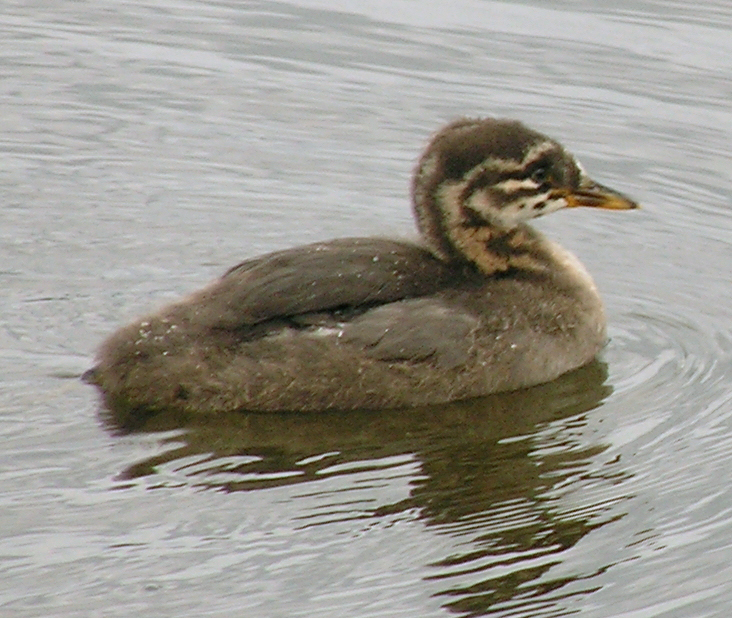
Chicks are fed by the parents for several weeks.

On the breeding grounds, the red-necked grebe feeds mainly on invertebrates including adult and larval aquatic insects, such as water beetles and dragonfly larvae, crayfish and molluscs. Fish (such as smelt) may be important locally or seasonally, especially for the American subspecies, and crustaceans can constitute up to 20% of the grebe's diet. Birds breeding at the coast often make foraging flights to inland lakes or offshore areas to feed.

Aquatic prey is obtained by diving or by swimming on surface with the head submerged, and terrestrial insects and their larvae are picked off vegetation. A line slanting downward from the eye to the tip of the opened lower mandible may be used for sighting on prey before diving or when swimming under water. The grebe probably opens its bill and looks down the eye-line toward its target. European breeders, which have to compete with the larger great crested grebe for fish, eat a greater proportion of invertebrates than the longer-billed American subspecies, although both races eat mainly fish in winter. Birds of the nominate subspecies from the northernmost breeding populations in Finland and Russia, beyond the range of great crested grebe, have a longer and more slender bill than those further south, reflecting a greater proportion of fish in the diet where their main competitor is absent. If food is scarce, parents may desert unhatched eggs, or allow the smallest chicks to starve, although the latter strategy appears not to be particularly efficient in protecting the older chicks.

Like other grebes, the red-necked grebe ingests large quantities of its own feathers, which remain in the bird's stomach. Feathers are not only swallowed by adults, mainly during self-preening, but are often fed to the young, sometimes within a day of hatching. These feathers soon decompose into a felt-like, amorphous mass. The function of the feathers in the stomach is unknown, although it has been suggested that they help to protect the lower digestive tract from bones and other hard, indigestible material.

== Status ==
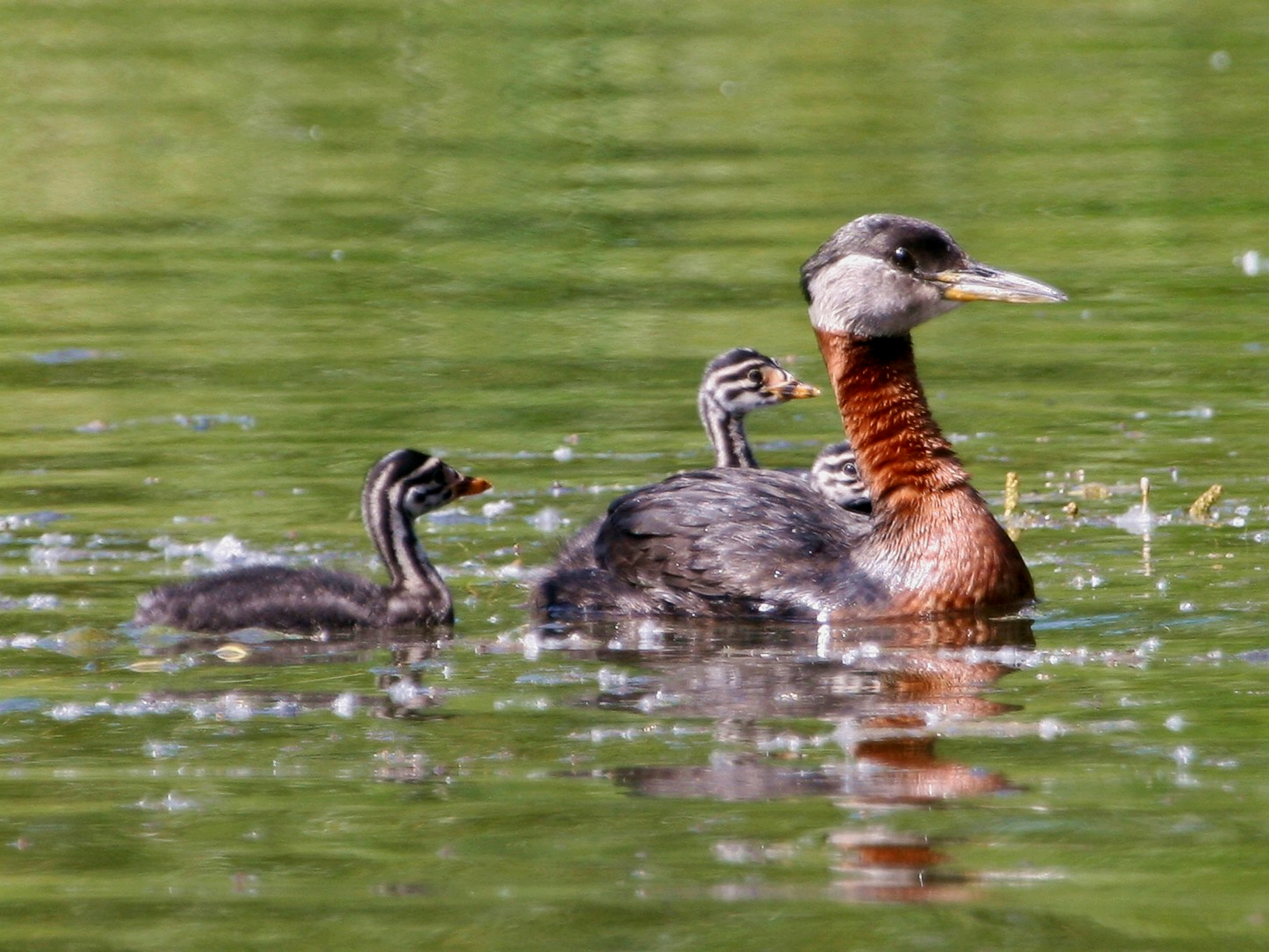
Adult and chicks

The red-necked grebe has a large range, estimated at 1–10 million square kilometres (0.4–3.8 million square miles), and a global population of 150,000–370,000 individuals, with P. g. holbollii about twice as numerous as the nominate race. The population trend has not been quantified, but it is not believed to meet the thresholds for the population decline criterion (declining more than 30% in ten years or three generations) of the IUCN Red List. For these reasons, the species is evaluated as Least Concern.

The red-necked grebe is one of the species to which the Agreement on the Conservation of African-Eurasian Migratory Waterbirds (AEWA) applies. Parties to the Agreement are required to engage in a wide range of conservation strategies which are describes in a detailed action plan. The plan is intended to address key issues such as species and habitat conservation, management of human activities, research, education, and implementation.

The red-necked grebe was hunted by humans in northern Europe in the Mesolithic and Paleolithic periods, but there is no evidence that there is any significant level of hunting at the present time. In North America, there are potential threats from pollutants such as polychlorinated biphenyls (PCBs) and pesticides such as DDT which cause reduced reproductive success due to egg sterility and eggshell thinning. Breeding areas may be threatened by the modification and degradation of lakes and by human disturbance from water-based recreational activities. There is no evidence to suggest that these threats could result in a significant risk to the overall population; more than 70% of North American red-necked grebes breed in Canada, where the population is stable or increasing.
