= Amabiliidae =

Scientific classification
- Kingdom: Animalia
- Phylum: Platyhelminthes
- Class: Cestoda
- Order: Cyclophyllidea
- Family: Amabiliidae; Braun, 1900

Genera
- Amabilia; Joyeuxilepis; Laterorchites; Tatria

Family of flatworms

The Amabiliidae are a family of tapeworms. It contains four genera and 23 species.

- Amabilia
- Joyeuxilepis
- Laterorchites
- Tatria
