= Podilymbus wetmorei =

Podilymbus wetmorei Temporal range: Rancholabrean

Scientific classification
- Kingdom: Animalia
- Phylum: Chordata
- Class: Aves
- Order: Podicipediformes
- Family: Podicipedidae
- Genus: Podilymbus
- Species: †P. wetmorei

Binomial name
- †Podilymbus wetmorei Storer, 1976

Extinct species of grebe

Podilymbus wetmorei is an extinct species of grebe recovered from the Late Pleistocene age of the United States.

== History ==
The holotype was collected on March 2, 1957 by American ornithologist and paleontologist Pierce Brodkorb. The holotype and referred material would later be described by the American ornithologist Robert W. Storer. The species name "wetmorei" is in honor of the late American ornithologist and avian paleontologist Alexander Wetmore.

== Description ==
The holotype (UF/PB 1762) of P. wetmorei is of a left tarsometatarsus. The holotype differs from other species of Podilymbus for the tarsometatarsus being wider and heavier. The overall dimensions, however, is similar to pied-billed grebe (P. podiceps). In comparison to P. majusculus the tarsometatarsus shorter and wider. It is shorter than the tarsometatarsus of the recently extinct Atitlán grebe (P. gigas). Additional specimens include another tarsometatarsus (UF 15223) and two femora (UF 15214 and UF 15220).

== Classification ==
Classified as a member of the genus Podilymbus, at least one author Steadman (1984) considers the species to be a junior synonym of the pied-billed grebe. Indeed the specimens for P. wetmorei fall within the size variation of pied-billed grebe.

== Paleobiology ==
P. wetmorei has been recovered from the Itchtucknee River, Columbia County, Florida dating to the Rancholabrean. The species was a contemporary of the pied-billed grebe and is possible that it was an endemic of the region. The thick and heavy bones of this species is a derived feature in the species, an extension of the adaptive diving abilities in Podilymbus. Members of Podilymbus diving downwards with their breast forwards.
