= Paraptenodytes robustus =

Paraptenodytes robustus Temporal range: Early Miocene (Colhuehuapian-Santacrucian) ~20.43–15.97 Ma

Scientific classification
- Kingdom: Animalia
- Phylum: Chordata
- Class: Aves
- Order: Sphenisciformes
- Family: Spheniscidae
- Genus: †Paraptenodytes
- Species: †P. robustus

Binomial name
- †Paraptenodytes robustus Ameghino 1894

Synonyms
- Palaeospheniscus robustus Ameghino, 1895; Paraptenodytes curtus Ameghino, 1901; Paraptenodytes grandis Ameghino, 1901; Arthrodytes grandis Ameghino, 1905; Metancylornis curtus Ameghino, 1905; Treleudytes crassa Ameghino, 1905; Treleudytes crassus Simpson, 1946; Perispheniscus robustus Brodkorb, 1963

Extinct species of bird

Paraptenodytes robustus is a species of the extinct penguin genus Paraptenodytes, which is known from fossils. It was medium-sized, an estimated 70 to 80 centimetres (28 to 31 in) long in life (similar to a Magellanic penguin).

The fossils of this species are known from several dozen bones, found in Early Miocene rocks of the Gaimán Formation. Documented locations are near La Cueva, Trelew in Chubut Province, and Puerto San Julián in Santa Cruz Province, Argentina. Most remains are only tentatively assigned to this species, however, and the tarsometatarsus formerly referred to as Treleudytes crassus may belong to a completely different species. On the other hand, Paraptenodytes brodkorbi is probably synonymous with P. robustus.
