= Podiceps dixi =

Podiceps dixi Temporal range: Rancholabrean

Scientific classification
- Kingdom: Animalia
- Phylum: Chordata
- Class: Aves
- Order: Podicipediformes
- Family: Podicipedidae
- Genus: Podiceps
- Species: †P. dixi

Binomial name
- †Podiceps dixi Brodkorb, 1963

Extinct species of grebe

Podiceps dixi is a possible extinct species of grebe from the United States.

== History ==
P. dixi was part of 5000 bird fossils that were cataloged from Reddick, Marion County, Florida. The material was collected by H. James Gut in 1950 and the species was described by the American ornithologist and paleontologist Pierce Brodkorb in 1963. The species name "dixi" is named after the Dixie Lime Products Company where they had a mine located at the Reddick beds where the fossil was found.

== Description ==
The holotype and only specimen (UF/PB 1113) is of a proximal end of the right carpometacarpus. It is similar to the living horned grebe (P. auritus) but somewhat larger.

== Classification ==
Due to the overall similarity of the bone to those of horned grebes, as well as the fragmentary nature of it, some authors have question the validity of the species suggesting that the name be a junior synonym of P. auritus.

== Paleobiology ==
The age of the P. dixi limb element is that of the Rancholabrean. During that time P. dixi would have been a contemporary of other waterbirds including the horned grebe and the pied-billed grebe (Podilymbus podiceps).
