= Gaiman Formation =

Geologic formation in Chubut Province, Argentina

- Stratigraphic range: Burdigalian (Colhuehuapian); ~19.8–17.5 Ma
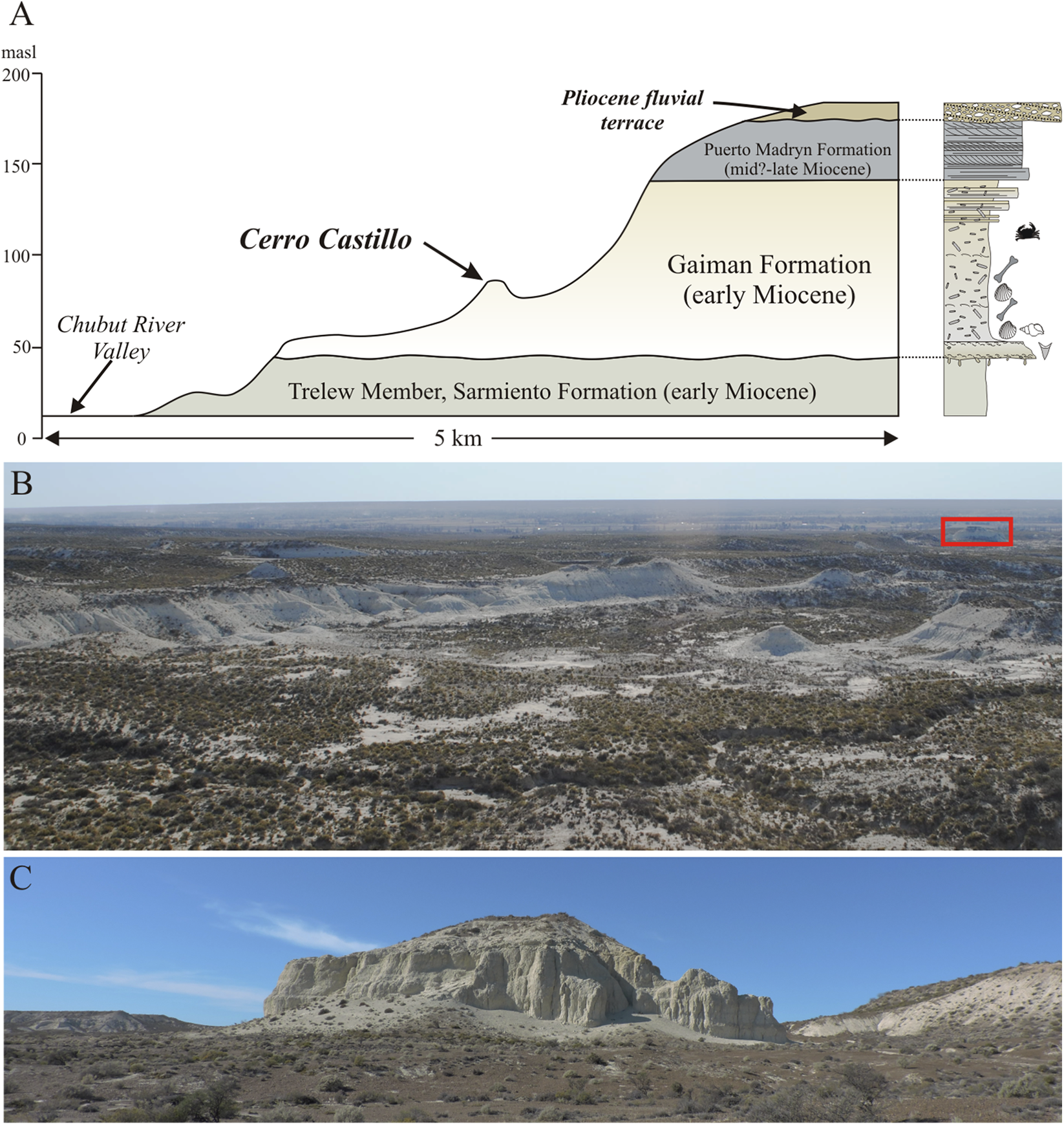
- Gaiman Formation stratigraphy at Cerro Castillo
- Type: Geological formation
- Underlies: Puerto Madryn Formation
- Overlies: Sarmiento Formation
- Thickness: 70 m (230 ft)

Lithology
- Primary: Mudstone, sandstone
- Other: Tuff, phosphate

Location
- Coordinates: 43.3°S 65.3°W
- Approximate paleocoordinates: 44.0°S 59.2°W
- Region: Chubut Province
- Country: Argentina
- Extent: Peninsula Valdés Basin

Type section
- Named for: Gaiman
- Named by: Mendía & Bayarsky
- Year defined: 1981
- Gaiman Formation (Argentina)

The Gaiman Formation (Spanish: Formación Gaiman), in older literature also referred to as Patagonian Marine Formation (Spanish: Formación Patagonia Marino, Patagoniense), is a fossiliferous geologic formation of the Peninsula Valdés Basin in the eastern Chubut Province of northwestern Patagonia, eastern Argentina.

The 70 metres (230 ft) thick formation overlies the Sarmiento Formation and is overlain by the Puerto Madryn Formation and comprises grey and white tuffaceous mudstones and sandstones, deposited in a shallow marine environment.

The Gaiman Formation has provided fossils of many extinct penguins, among which five species in the genus Palaeospheniscus, as well as whales and dolphins, most notably Aondelphis talen, Prosqualodon australis, Idiorophus patagonicus and Argyrocetus patagonicus, indeterminate seal and turtle fossils, shark and other fossils. The richness of the formation, and the other formations in the area, such as the underlying Sarmiento Formation, led to the establishment of the Bryn Gwyn Paleontological Park, with a Welsh name, reflecting the number of Welsh settlers in the region.

== Description ==
Outcrop map and stratigraphic column of the Gaiman Formation in the Peninsula Valdes Basin

The Gaiman Formation was first defined by Mendía & Bayarsky in 1981, and further described by Mendía in 1983, taking its name from Gaiman in Chubut Province, eastern Patagonia. Gaiman in the local language of the native Tehuelche people means "rocky point". The formation crops out in the lower course of the Chubut River, and overlies the continental Trelew Member of the Sarmiento Formation and is overlain by the Late Miocene Puerto Madryn Formation. The formation is 70 metres (230 ft) thick, and comprises marine tuffs, tuffaceous mudstones, sandstones and coquinas.

The Gaiman Formation is correlated with the Chenque Formation of the Golfo San Jorge Basin and the Monte León Formation of the Austral Basin to the south, the Saladar Member of the lower Gran Bajo del Gualicho Formation of the Colorado Basin to the north and the Vaca Mahuida Formation of the Neuquén Basin to the northwest.

=== Depositional environment ===
The basal stratum of the Gaiman Formation is a thin transgressive lag with some gravels, bones and teeth from marine vertebrates. The unit displays a concentration of phosphatic concretions, ooids, bones and teeth. The marine sediments overlying this basal stratum are composed of white, tuffaceous, thoroughly bioturbated mudstones and fine sandstones with occasional mollusk molds and thin oyster horizons, deposited in a shallow shelf environment.

The marine transgression leading to the deposition of the Gaiman Formation is the first of two major South Atlantic transgressions of the Miocene, the second causing the deposition of the overlying Puerto Madryn Formation.

Facies analysis shows that the formation represents a transgressive-regressive stratigraphic cycle, with palaeoenvironments including coastal, storm-dominated shoreface, inner shelf embayment and open inner shelf.

The age of the Gaiman Formation is established on stratigraphic correlations to other absolutely-dated sections in Patagonia and biostratigraphic data and dates to the Early Miocene (Burdigalian, or Colhuehuapian in the SALMA classification).

== Paleontological significance ==
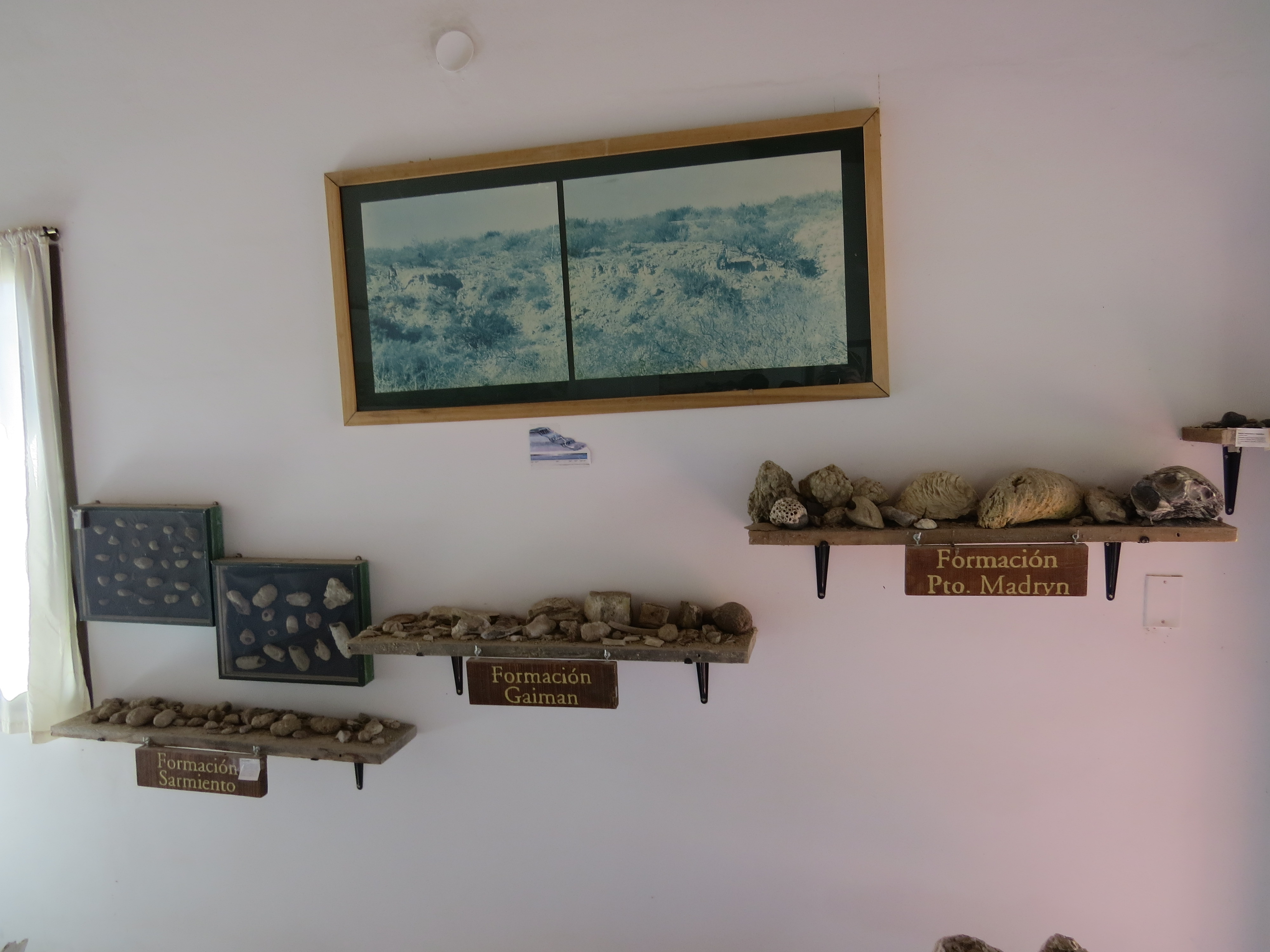
Fossils of the Gaiman Formation in the Bryn Gwyn Paleontological Park

The Gaiman Formation has provided several fossil penguins, of which nine are assigned to specific species and include five species of the genus Palaeospheniscus. Also, shark teeth, fossils of indeterminate seals and turtles, and several dolphins, baleen and toothed whales have been found in the formation. Argentine paleontologist Florentino Ameghino described an isolated tooth from the formation first as an ichthyodectiform fish, Portheus patagonicus in 1901, however this fossil was assigned to a delphinoid cetacean of the family Kentriodontidae by Cione and Cozzuol in 1990. Fish recorded from the formation are hexanchiform hexanchids, lamniform isurids, odontaspidids, cetorhinids, carcharhiniform carcharhinids, heterodontiform heterodontids, squatiniform squatinids myliobatiform myliobatids, perciform oplegnathids and labrids, and tetraodontiform molids. Rays are abundant in the formation. The lack of somatic remains of most molluscs, bryozoans, polychaetes and cirripeds in the formation is attributed to the high-energy and corrosive environment at time of deposition, as well as diagenesis after the formation was deposited.

The bird species Eretiscus tonnii solely occurs in the Gaiman Formation. Bite marks on several of the penguin bones are attributed to terrestrial mammals such as didelphid or hathliacyniid sparassodont marsupials, common in Patagonia during the Miocene. Other ichnofossils found on the bones are presumably caused by dental erosion by regular echinoids, and bite marks by sharks, as Galeocerdo aduncus.

The paleontological richness of the formation, as well as the more fossiliferous underlying Sarmiento Formation, led to the establishment of the Bryn Gwyn Paleontological Park.

== Fossil content ==
The formation has provided the following fossils:

=== Mammals ===
==== Cetaceans ====
Taxa	Species	Locality	Material	Description	Images	Notes
Aglaocetus	A. moreni	Cerro del Castillo and Bahia Solano	A skull	An early baleen Whale		
Aondelphis	A. talen	Bryn Gwyn Locality	A partial skull	An early river dolphin		
Argyrocetus	A. patagonicus	Bryn Gwyn Locality	A skull	An early toothed whale		
Crisocetus	C. lydekkeri	Estancia El Crisol	A partial skull	An early toothed whale		
Dolgopolis	D. kinchikafiforo	Estancia El Crisol	A partial skull	An early toothed whale		
Eurhinodelphinidae	indet.					
Idiorophus	I. patagonicus	Bryn Gwyn Locality	A complete skull	An early toothed whale		
Kentriodon	K. sp.	Bryn Gwyn Locality	A specimen	An early toothed whale		
Morenocetus	M. parvus	Cerro del Castillo, Trelew	A partial cranium	An early baleen whale		
Phoberodon	P. arctirostris	Playa Magagna and Cerro del Castillo, Trelew	A partial skeleton with skull	An early river dolphin		
Plesiocetus	P. dyticus	Cerro del Castillo	A specimen	An early rorqual		
Prosqualodon	P. australis	Playa Magagna and Cerro del Castillo	A preserved skeleton	An early toothed whale		
Squalodontidae	indet.					

==== Pinnipeds ====
Taxa	Species	Locality	Material	Description	Images	Notes
Phocidae	indet.					

=== Birds ===
Taxa	Species	Locality	Material	Description	Images	Notes
Anseriformes	indet.					
Apterodytes	A. ictus	Cerro del Castillo		An early penguin		
Arthrodytes	A. sp.					
Cayaoa	C. bruneti	Cerro Castillo	A specimen	An early anatid water bird		
Eretiscus	E. tonnii			An early prenguin		
Palaeospheniscus	P. bergi	Cerro del Castillo, Trelew	A set of limb elements (humerus, radius, tarsometatarsus)	An early penguin		
Palaeospheniscus	P. bilocular	Cerro del Castillo	Two characteristic humeri (AMNH 3341 and 3346)	An early penguin, formally named Chubutodyptes biloculata		
Palaeospheniscus	P. gracilis	Gran Bajo de San Julian and Cerro del Castillo	A specimen	An early penguin		
Palaeospheniscus	P. patagonicus	Cerro del Castillo		An early penguin		
Palaeospheniscus	P. wimani	Cerro del Castillo		An early penguin		
Paraptenodytes	P. antarcticus		A partial skeleton			
Paraptenodytes	P. robustus					
Sphenisciformes	indet.					

=== Reptiles ===
Taxa	Species	Locality	Material	Description	Images	Notes
Dermochelyidae	indet.					
Helianthochelys	H. redondita.	Coastal creek located 5 km east of La Redonda Chica House in La Redonda Chica Farm	A near-complete carapace (secondary ossicles and nuchal bone) with a putative skull fragment (jugal) and postcranial elements.	A sea turtle belonging to the family Dermochelyidae.		

=== Fish ===
Taxa	Species	Locality	Material	Description	Images	Notes
Carcharoides	C. totuserratus			A mackerel shark		
Echinorhinus	E. pozzii					
Galeocerdo	G. aduncus					
Megascyliorhinus	M. trelewensis					
Heterodontus	H. sp.					
Odontaspis	O. sp.					
Pristiophorus	P. sp.					
Squalus	S. sp.					
Oplegnathidae	Oplegnathidae indet					
Tetraodontiformes	Tetraodontiformes indet					

=== Mollusks ===
Taxa	Species	Locality	Material	Description	Images	Notes
Crassostrea	C. ? hatcheri			A bivalve		
Balanus	B. sp.			A bivalve		
Turritella	T. sp.			A gastropod		

=== Ichnofossils ===
Taxa	Species	Locality	Material	Description	Images	Notes
Chondrites				A Bioturbation		
Ophiomorpha				A Bioturbation		
Planolites				A Bioturbation		
Skolithos				A Bioturbation		
Gnathichnus	G. pentax			Bite marks		
Entobia				Bite marks		

== Flora ==
Taxa	Species	Locality	Material	Description	Images	Notes
Chenopodipollis	C. chenopodiaceoides	Isla Escondida		A chenopodiaceae		
Cyatheacidites	C. annulatus	Isla Escondida		A dicksoniaceae		
Equisetosporites	E. claricristatus	Isla Escondida				
Margocolporites	M. vanwijhei	Isla Escondida		A fabaceae		
Nothofagidites	N. saraensis	Isla Escondida				
Peromonolites	P. vellosus	Isla Escondida		A blechnaceae		
Thalassotaenia	T. notophyllum	Isla Escondida		A hydrocharitaceae		

== See also ==
- South American land mammal ages
- Uitpa Formation, contemporaneous fossiliferous formation of the Cocinetas Basin, Colombia
- Castillo Formation, contemporaneous fossiliferous formation of the Falcón Basin, Venezuela
- Biblián Formation, contemporaneous fossiliferous formation of Ecuador
- Bahía Inglesa Formation, contemporaneous fossiliferous formation of Chile
