= Podilymbus majusculus =

Podilymbus majusculus Temporal range: Piacenzian

Scientific classification
- Kingdom: Animalia
- Phylum: Chordata
- Class: Aves
- Order: Podicipediformes
- Family: Podicipedidae
- Genus: Podilymbus
- Species: †P. majusculus

Binomial name
- †Podilymbus majusculus Murray, 1967

Extinct species of grebe

Podilymbus majusculus is an extinct species of grebe recovered from the Piacenzian age of the United States.

== History ==
The specimens were collected in the summer of 1965 from Idaho, United States by Claude W. Hibbard and the species was named in 1967 by Bertram G. Murray. The species name "majusculus" is Latin for "somewhat larger or greater", referring to the larger size of the species compared to the related pied-billed grebe (P. podiceps).

== Description ==
The holotype material is a complete tarsometatarsus (UMMP 52470). The tarsometatarsus is similar in characteristic to the pied-billed grebe, but being larger in size. Compared to the recently extinct Atitlán grebe (P. gigas), the tarsometatarsus of P. majusculus is slender in width and longer. Other material that Murray (1967) can confidently identified belonging to P. majusculus is the anterior portion of the sternum (UMMP 45277) and a femur that is missing the proximal end (UMMP 52455). Both of these bone material are larger than any seen in pied-billed grebes. A complete ulna (UMMP 52536), a near complete femur (UMMP 52300), another femur with its distal portion (UMMP 49496), a proximal end of a femur (UMMP 49496), and a wornout but complete tarsometatarsus (UMMP 53703), and a possible complete scapula (UMMP 52672) have been also assigned to the species. Tibiotarsii recovered from the similarly aged Rexroad Formation and the Saw Rock Canyon Formation of Kansas have been tentatively assigned to this species (UMMP 51846 and UMMP 31716 respectively).

== Classification ==
Classified in the genus Podilymbus, P. majusculus is the oldest known of the Podilymbus species.

== Paleobiology ==
P. majusculus is known from the Glenns Ferry Formation which the formation dates from the Piacenzian age of the Pliocene epoch in Idaho, United States. The environment that P. majusculus lived in was a wetland where it cohabited with various waterbirds including Aechmophorus elasson, another Neogene grebe species. There is some size variation seen in the specimens where it is possible the larger ones are males and the smaller ones are females (as seen in the recent Podilymbus species).
