= Palaeospheniscus gracilis =

Palaeospheniscus gracilis Temporal range: Early Miocene (Colhuehuapian-Friasian) ~20.43–15.97 Ma

Scientific classification
- Domain: Eukaryota
- Kingdom: Animalia
- Phylum: Chordata
- Class: Aves
- Order: Sphenisciformes
- Family: Spheniscidae
- Genus: †Palaeospheniscus
- Species: †P. gracilis

Binomial name
- †Palaeospheniscus gracilis Ameghino 1899

Synonyms
- Palaeospheniscus nereius Ameghino 1901; Neculus rothi Ameghino 1905; Paraspheniscus nereius Ameghino 1905; Palaeospheniscus medianus Ameghino 1905

Extinct species of bird

Palaeospheniscus gracilis is a species of the extinct penguin genus Palaeospheniscus. It is the smallest species of its genus, with a height of 40 to 60 centimetres (16 to 24 in). Average individuals, thus, were about the size of the Galapagos penguin.

== Description ==
This species was long believed to have first been found in Early Oligocene deposits. However, it seems that the type specimen, a tarsometatarsus, was recovered not from Early Oligocene rocks, but was found on top of them, having been displaced there from a later stratum. The location where the bone was found seems to have been near Cabeza Blanca. At any rate, all later specimens were found in the Early Miocene Gaiman Formation; those that have locality data are from the area around Trelew and Gaiman in Chubut Province, Argentina.

Some recent researchers have suggested that this species should be considered a synonym of Palaeospheniscus bergi.
