= Paraptenodytes brodkorbi =

Paraptenodytes brodkorbi Temporal range: Early Miocene (Deseadan-Friasian) ~23.03–15.97 Ma

Scientific classification
- Domain: Eukaryota
- Kingdom: Animalia
- Phylum: Chordata
- Class: Aves
- Order: Sphenisciformes
- Family: Spheniscidae
- Genus: †Paraptenodytes
- Species: †P. brodkorbi

Binomial name
- †Paraptenodytes brodkorbi Simpson 1972

Synonyms
- Isotremornis nordenskjöldi (partim) Ameghino 1905

Extinct species of bird

Paraptenodytes brodkorbi is a proposed, but possibly invalid, species of extinct penguin in the genus Paraptenodytes. The bird was probably about the size of a king penguin. Known material is limited to a single humerus, Early Miocene in age, found in the Monte León Formation near Puerto San Julián in Santa Cruz Province, Argentina. It exists as an unnumbered specimen in the collection of the Museo Argentino de Ciencias Naturales.

== Description ==
This taxon is the product of a nomenclatorial dispute. Florentino Ameghino in 1905 described some penguin bones which he thought to be specifically distinct as Isotremornis nordenskjöldi: a tarsometatarsus, a humerus, and a part of a femur. Subsequently, the tarsometatarsus and the femur piece turned out to be from Paraptenodytes antarcticus. George Gaylord Simpson (1946) and Pierce Brodkorb (1963) argued about whether the bones could all be considered syntypes or whether only the wrongly assigned tarsometatarsus was designated as the holotype. Brodkorb argued for the latter, and Simpson "reluctantly" agreed; Isotremornis nordenskjöldi became a junior synonym of P. antarcticus. Thus, another name had to be given - and added to the already long and confusing list of valid and invalid fossil penguin taxa - to the distinct humerus of the new species Ameghino had thought he described. Tongue-in-cheek, Simpson (1972) dedicated the new binomen to Brodkorb. Acosta Hospitaleche (2005) considered the humerus to be assignable to Paraptenodytes robustus; Bertelli et al. (2006) disagree, but believe that it belongs into a different genus.
