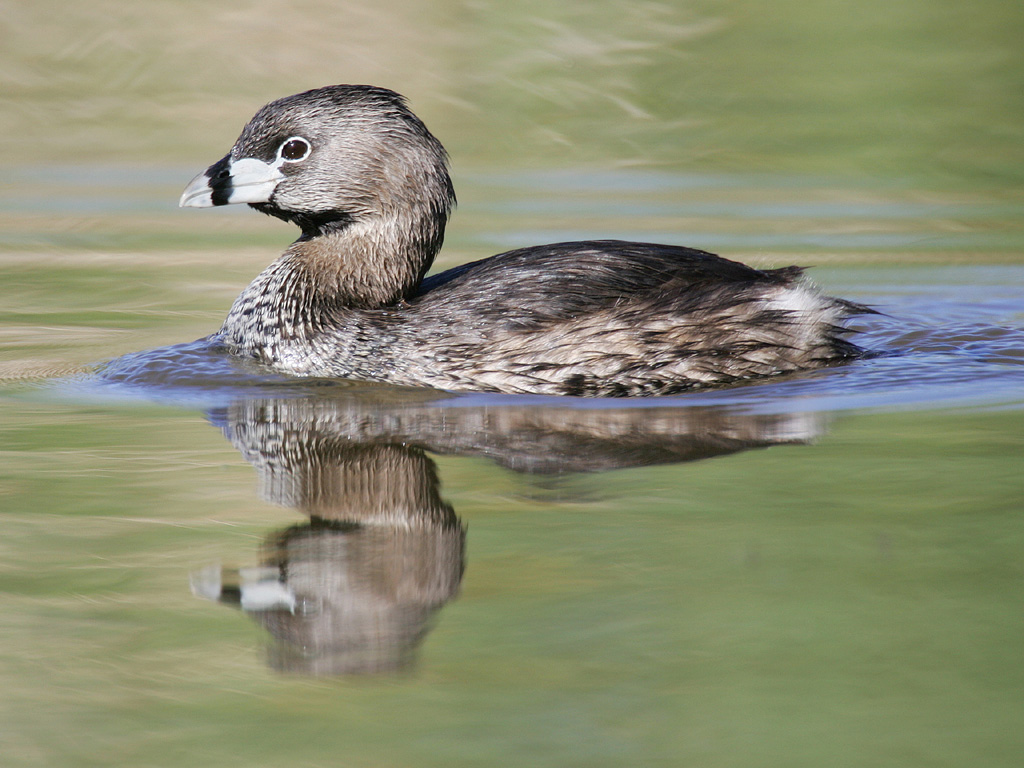
- Pied-billed grebe

Scientific classification
- Kingdom: Animalia
- Phylum: Chordata
- Class: Aves
- Order: Podicipediformes
- Family: Podicipedidae
- Tribe: Podilymbini
- Genus: Podilymbus; Lesson, 1831

Species
- †Podilymbus majusculus; †Podilymbus wetmorei; †Podilymbus gigas; Podilymbus podiceps

= Podilymbus =

Podilymbus Temporal range: Late Pliocene to present

Genus of birds

Podilymbus is a genus of birds in the Grebe family, the genus name is derived from Latin Podilymbus, a contraction of podicipes ("feet at the buttocks", from podici-, "rump-" + pes, "foot")—the origin of the name of the grebe order—and Ancient Greek kolymbos, "diver".

== Species ==
The genus contains two recent species :

Genus Podilymbus – Lesson, 1831 – two species
Common name	Scientific name and subspecies	Range	Size and ecology	IUCN status and estimated population
Pied-billed grebe	Podilymbus podiceps (Linnaeus, 1758) Three subspecies: P. p. podiceps, (Linnaeus, 1758); P. p. antarcticus, (Lesson, 1842); P. p. antillarum, (Bangs, 1913)	North America, Central America, the Caribbean, and South America	Size: Habitat: Diet:	LC
† Atitlán grebe	Podilymbus gigas Griscom, 1929	Guatemala; declared extinct in 1990	Size: Habitat: Diet:	EX

There are also several prehistoric taxa of Podilymbus described from fossil remains:

- Podilymbus majusculus (Late Pliocene of Idaho)
- Podilymbus wetmorei (Late Pleistocene of Florida)
- Podilymbus podiceps magnus - a paleosubspecies of the pied-billed grebe of uncertain validity.
