= Palaeospheniscus wimani =

Palaeospheniscus wimani Temporal range: Early Miocene (Deseadan-Colhuehuapian) ~23.03–20.43 Ma

Scientific classification
- Domain: Eukaryota
- Kingdom: Animalia
- Phylum: Chordata
- Class: Aves
- Order: Sphenisciformes
- Family: Spheniscidae
- Genus: †Palaeospheniscus
- Species: †P. wimani

Binomial name
- †Palaeospheniscus wimani Ameghino 1905

Synonyms
- Perispheniscus wimani Ameghino 1905; Palaeospheniscus robustus (partim) Simpson 1946

Extinct species of bird

The extinct penguin Palaeospheniscus wimani is a member of the genus Palaeospheniscus, which belonged to the prehistoric subfamily Palaeospheniscinae. It was the largest member of its genus, being just as large as the Magellanic penguin of today (to which it is quite unrelated).

== Description ==
A fairly large number of fossil bones has been found, some of which are tentatively assigned to this species. They are from the Early Miocene Gaiman Formation. The specimens from known localities were collected near Trelew and Gaiman in Chubut Province, Argentina. As there is not much notable difference apart from size, this species is sometimes considered a synonym of Palaeospheniscus patagonicus.

Carl Wiman is honored by the binomen wimani. He was one of the foremost researcher of prehistoric penguins in the early 20th century.
