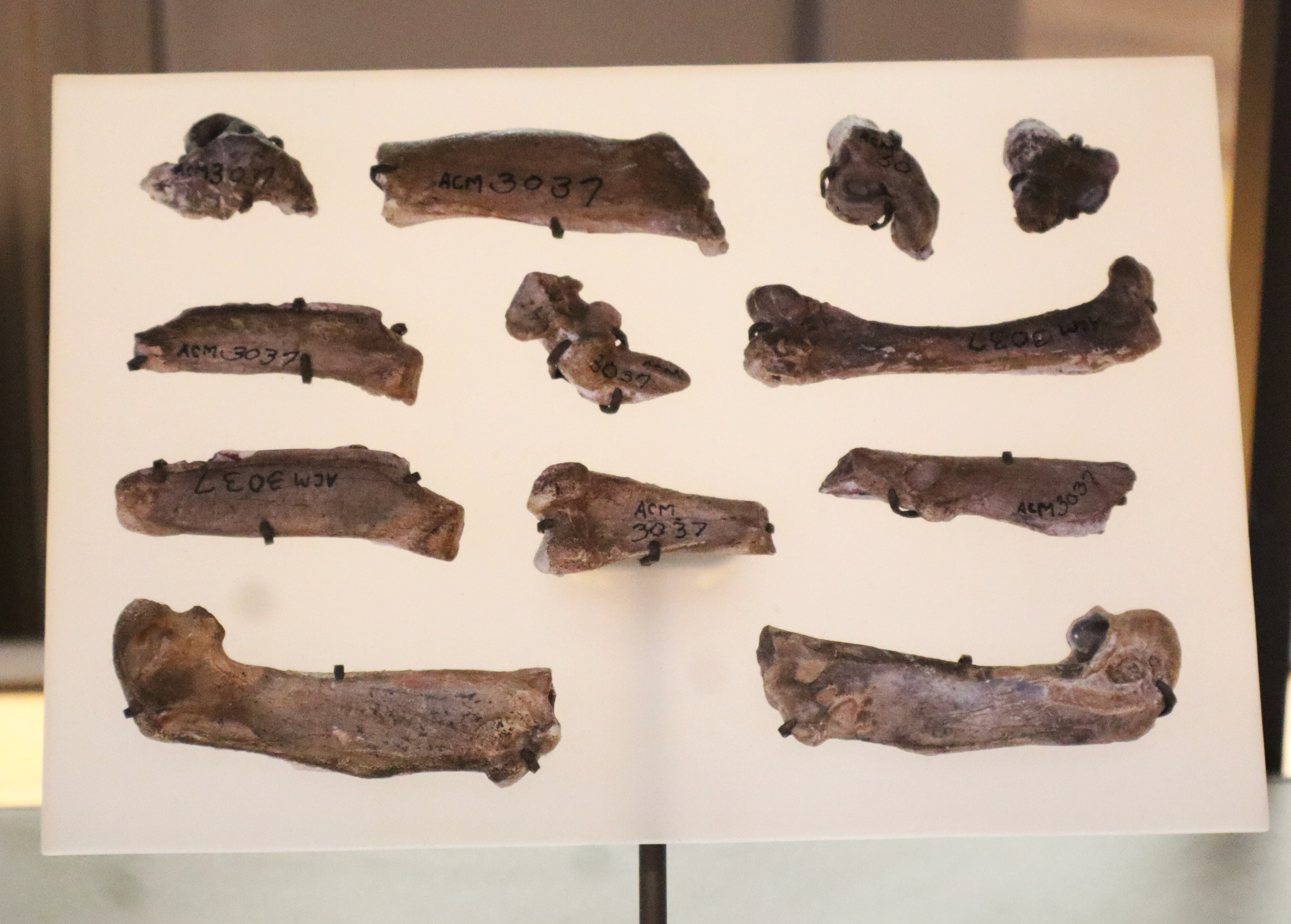
- Fossil material, Beneski Museum of Natural History

Scientific classification
- Kingdom: Animalia
- Phylum: Chordata
- Class: Aves
- Order: Sphenisciformes
- Family: Spheniscidae
- Genus: †Palaeospheniscus
- Species: †P. patagonicus

Binomial name
- †Palaeospheniscus patagonicus Moreno & Mercerat 1891

Synonyms
- Palaeospheniscus menzbieri Moreno & Mercerat 1891; Palaeospheniscus interruptus Ameghino 1905; Palaeospheniscus intermedius Ameghino 1905; Palaeospheniscus affinis Ameghino 1905

= Palaeospheniscus patagonicus =

Palaeospheniscus patagonicus Temporal range: Early Miocene (Colhuehuapian-Friasian) ~20.43–15.97 Ma

Extinct species of bird

Palaeospheniscus patagonicus is the type species of the penguin genus Palaeospheniscus, which is known from fossils. It stood about 65 to 75 centimetres (26 to 30 in) high in life, roughly the size of an African penguin.

== Description ==
This species is known from several dozen bones, found in Early Miocene strata of the Gaiman Formation. The specimens from known localities were collected near Trelew and Gaiman in Chubut Province, Argentina.

Currently, there is some debate about whether Palaeospheniscus wimani is a synonym of this species or not.
