= Palaeospheniscus bergi =

Palaeospheniscus bergi Temporal range: Early-Mid Miocene (Colloncuran-Laventan) ~15.97–11.6 Ma

Scientific classification
- Domain: Eukaryota
- Kingdom: Animalia
- Phylum: Chordata
- Class: Aves
- Order: Sphenisciformes
- Family: Spheniscidae
- Genus: †Palaeospheniscus
- Species: †P. bergi

Binomial name
- †Palaeospheniscus bergi Moreno & Mercerat 1891

Synonyms
- See text

Extinct species of bird

Palaeospheniscus bergi is a species of the extinct penguin genus Palaeospheniscus. It stood about 60 to 75 centimetres (24 to 30 in) high in life, or somewhat smaller on average than the extant African penguin.

== Etymology ==
The species is named for Carlos Berg, a member of the La Plata Museum of Natural Sciences staff at the time when Moreno worked there.

== Description ==
Many bones referrable to this species have been recovered from the Early to Middle Miocene Gaiman and Puerto Madryn Formations and the El Foyel Group. Known localities are Trelew in Chubut Province and Puerto San Julián in Santa Cruz Province, Argentina.

Some recent researchers have considered Palaeospheniscus gracilis to be a synonym for this species.

== Taxonomy ==
Bones of this species were described as no less than 6 "species" (including the correct one) from 3 "genera" by Florentino Ameghino in a single publication. The synonyms are as follows:

- Palaeospheniscus bergii (lapsus) Ameghino, 1891
- Paraspheniscus bergi Ameghino, 1905
- Palaeospheniscus planus Ameghino, 1905
- Palaeospheniscus rothi Ameghino, 1905
- Pseudospheniscus interplanus Ameghino, 1905
- Pseudospheniscus planus Ameghino, 1905
- Pseudospheniscus concavus Ameghino, 1905
- Pseudospheniscus convexus Ameghino, 1905

Either Pseudospheniscus interplanus or P. planus, as well as either Pseudospheniscus concavus or P. convexus, are a lapsus too.
