= Podiceps howardae =

Podiceps howardae Temporal range: Zanclean

Scientific classification
- Domain: Eukaryota
- Kingdom: Animalia
- Phylum: Chordata
- Class: Aves
- Order: Podicipediformes
- Family: Podicipedidae
- Genus: Podiceps
- Species: †P. howardae

Binomial name
- †Podiceps howardae Storer, 2001

Extinct species of grebe

Podiceps howardae is a possible extinct species of grebe from the United States, possibly a larger and earlier form of the horned grebe (P. auritus).

== History ==
In 2001 an article was published that took account of over 10,000 specimens coming from 112 bird species. The age of these fossils date from the Middle Miocene to the Zanclean found at Aurora, Beaufort County, North Carolina, collected from the 1960s to 1970s. The species is named in honor of the paleornithologist Hildegarde Howard for her contribution of fossil birds.

== Description ==
Twenty two bones were used for description by American ornithologist Robert W. Storer. The holotype (USNM 252314) is a complete right femur. The femur is similar in proportions to the horned grebe, but differs in that the femur of P. howardae is narrower across the distal end as well as the external condyle being narrow too. Seven other femora were also found and assigned as the paratypes (KUVP 21240, USNM 177918, USNM 178151, USNM 206413, USNM 215453, USNM 215649, and USNM 460785). A nearly complete tarsometatarsus (KUVP 21239) and a proximal half of another one (USNM 250773) is similar in length and width of those found in the largest male horned grebe. The distal portion of the bone from another specimen (USNM 210531), however, shows to be more slender as seen in male and female members of horned grebes. Fragmentary tarsometatarsi, one of a proximal portion (USNM 193175) and the other a distal portion (USNM 206326), are more similar in size to USNM 210531. A nearly complete coracoid (USNM 177927) is similar in characteristic to those from horned grebes, but the sternal facet is relatively deeper. A nearly complete humerus (USNM 243764) has a length that is within the range of measurements seen in the humeri of female horned grebes. Additional humeri (a proximal portion USNM 183430 and four distal portions USNM 193242, USNM 215034, USNM 368557, USNM 430524) are within the size range of horned grebe humeri, though a fifth distal (USNM 407798) is much larger and might come from a male bird. The distal portion of an ulna (KUVP 21292) is slightly heavier and wider than the ulnae of horned grebes.

== Classification ==
While Storer (2001) argued that the age and size of the grebe was sufficient to warrant as a new species, Olson and Rasmussen (2001) argued that the material should be transferred over to P. auritus instead.

== Paleobiology ==
P. howardae comes from the Yorktown Formation dating to the Zanclean. Based on fossils of other birds and fish that have been found there, the area was a coastal environment where various of water and seabirds would have been found there in great abundance.
