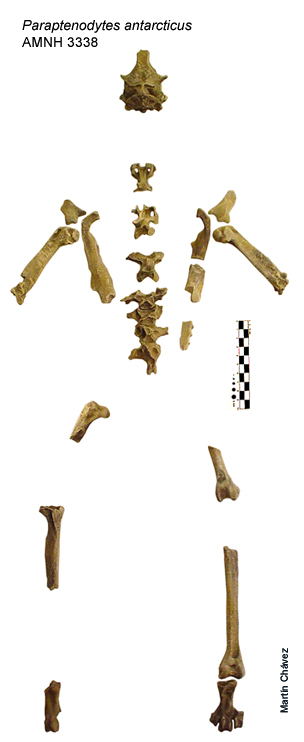
- Cast of the specimen AMNH3338 of P. antarcticus, in the Museo Paleontologico Egidio Feruglio in Trelew, Argentina

Scientific classification
- Domain: Eukaryota
- Kingdom: Animalia
- Phylum: Chordata
- Class: Aves
- Order: Sphenisciformes
- Family: Spheniscidae
- Subfamily: †Paraptenodytinae
- Genus: †Paraptenodytes; Ameghino, 1891

Species
- P. antarcticus (type); P. robustus; P. brodkorbi (disputed)

Synonyms
- Metancylornis Ameghino 1905; Isotremornis Ameghino 1905; Treleudytes Ameghino 1905

= Paraptenodytes =

Paraptenodytes Temporal range: Early-Mid Miocene (Colhuehuapian-Laventan) possibly to Pliocene ~20.43–11.6 Ma

Extinct genus of birds

Paraptenodytes is an extinct genus of penguins which contains two or three species sized between a Magellanic penguin and an emperor penguin (Aptenodytes forsteri). They are known from fossil bones ranging from a partial skeleton and some additional material in the case of P. antarcticus, the type specimen for the genus, and a single humerus in the case of P. brodkorbi. The latter species is therefore often considered invalid; a recent study considers it indeed valid, but distinct enough not to belong into Paraptenodytes. The fossils were found in the Santa Cruz and Chubut Provinces of Patagonia, Argentina, in the Gaiman, Monte León and Santa Cruz Formations of Early to Middle Miocene age. Later occurrences are apparently from Late Miocene or possibly even Early Pliocene deposits.

Together with the related genus Arthrodytes, they form the subfamily Paraptenodytinae, which is not an ancestor of modern penguins.
