= Palaeospheniscus bilocular =

Palaeospheniscus bilocular Temporal range: Early Miocene (Colhuehuapian-Friasian) ~20.43–15.97 Ma

Scientific classification
- Domain: Eukaryota
- Kingdom: Animalia
- Phylum: Chordata
- Class: Aves
- Order: Sphenisciformes
- Family: Spheniscidae
- Genus: †Palaeospheniscus
- Species: †P. bilocular

Binomial name
- †Palaeospheniscus bilocular Simpson 1970

Synonyms
- Chubutodyptes biloculata Simpson 1970

Extinct species of bird

Palaeospheniscus bilocular is a species of fossil penguins in the genus Palaeospheniscus. The species was named after two characteristic humeri (AMNH 3341 and 3346) (Simpson 1946) from the Early Miocene Gaiman Formation which were found near Gaiman in Chubut Province, Argentina. It was the size of a small gentoo penguin.

In 2007, P. biloculata was moved to the genus from Chubutodyptes, the species becoming P. bilocular.
