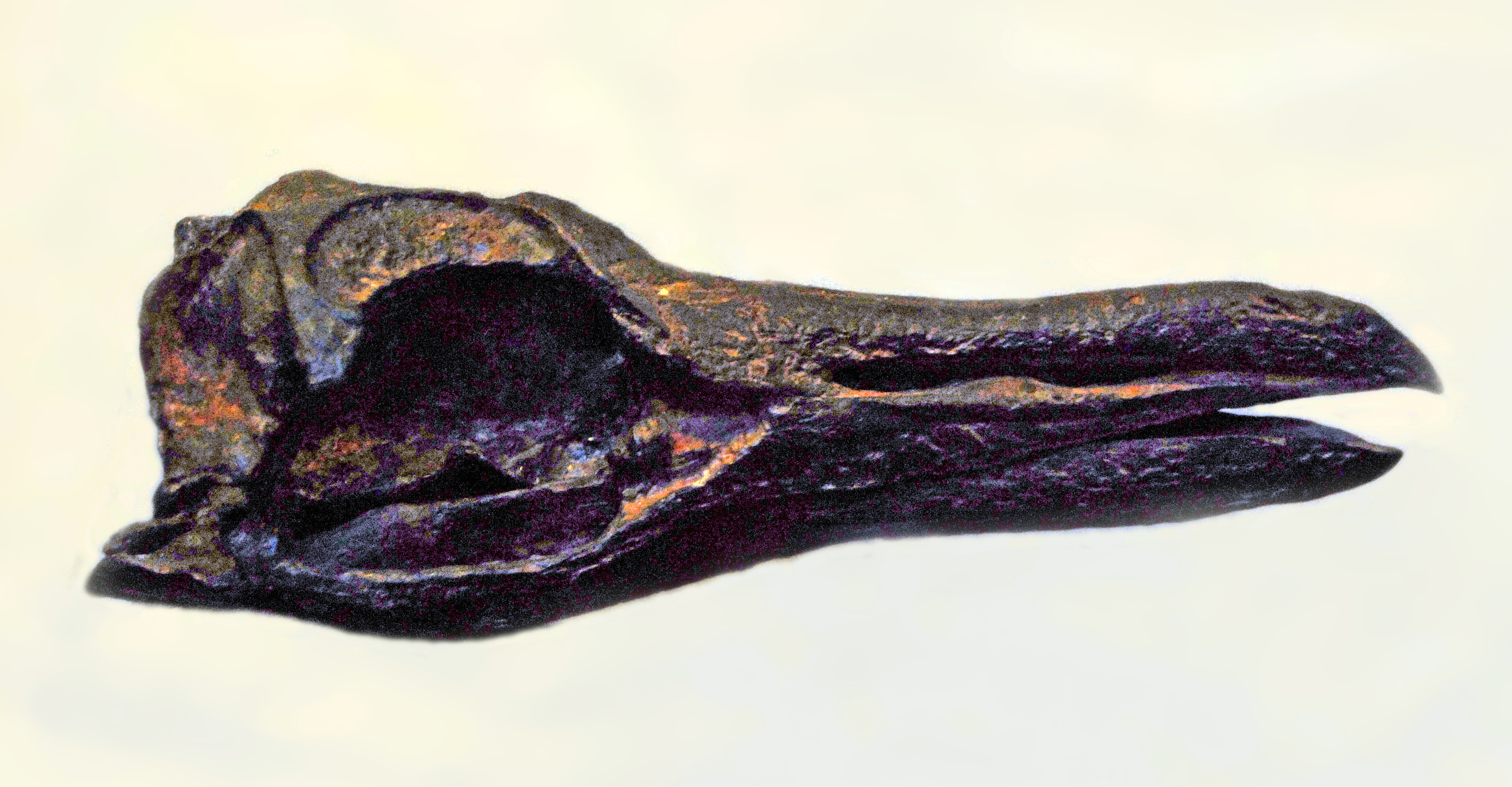
- Fossil skull of Palaeospheniscus from Peru

Scientific classification
- Kingdom: Animalia
- Phylum: Chordata
- Class: Aves
- Order: Sphenisciformes
- Family: Spheniscidae
- Subfamily: †Palaeospheniscinae
- Genus: †Palaeospheniscus; Moreno & Mercerat, 1891

Synonyms
- Neculus Ameghino, 1905; Paraspheniscus Ameghino, 1905; Perispheniscus Ameghino, 1905; Pseudospheniscus Ameghino, 1905; Chubutodyptes Simpson, 1970 (disputed)

= Palaeospheniscus =

Palaeospheniscus Temporal range: Early Miocene–Early Pliocene

Extinct genus of birds

Palaeospheniscus is an extinct genus of penguins belonging to the subfamily Palaeospheniscinae. These penguins are apparently not closely related to the modern genus Spheniscus.

== Description ==
The species of Palaeospheniscus were medium-sized to largish penguins, ranging from P. gracilis with an estimated maximal length of 55 cm to P. wimani, which reached up to 73 cm.

== Species ==
This genus contains the following three species:

- Palaeospheniscus patagonicus (type)
- Palaeospheniscus bergi
- Palaeospheniscus biloculatus

The following other species are disputed:

- Palaeospheniscus wimani (disputed)
- Palaeospheniscus gracilis (disputed)

They are all (except P. bergi, which is somewhat enigmatic) known from one or two handfuls of bones. Most of the specimens were found in Santa Cruz and Chubut Provinces of Patagonia, Argentina. The fossils were recovered from the Patagonian Molasse Formation, and are probably Early Miocene to Late Miocene or possibly Early Pliocene in age (Stucchi et al. 2003).

The type species of this genus is Palaeospheniscus patagonicus, the Patagonian slender-footed penguin. Palaeospheniscus gracilis was long believed to be from the Early Oligocene, but this is now thought to be erroneous.

== Distribution ==
Specimen belonging to this genus have been found in the Pliocene of South Africa, in Miocene to Pliocene of Chile, in Miocene of Argentina and South Africa and in Oligocene to Miocene of Argentina and Peru.
