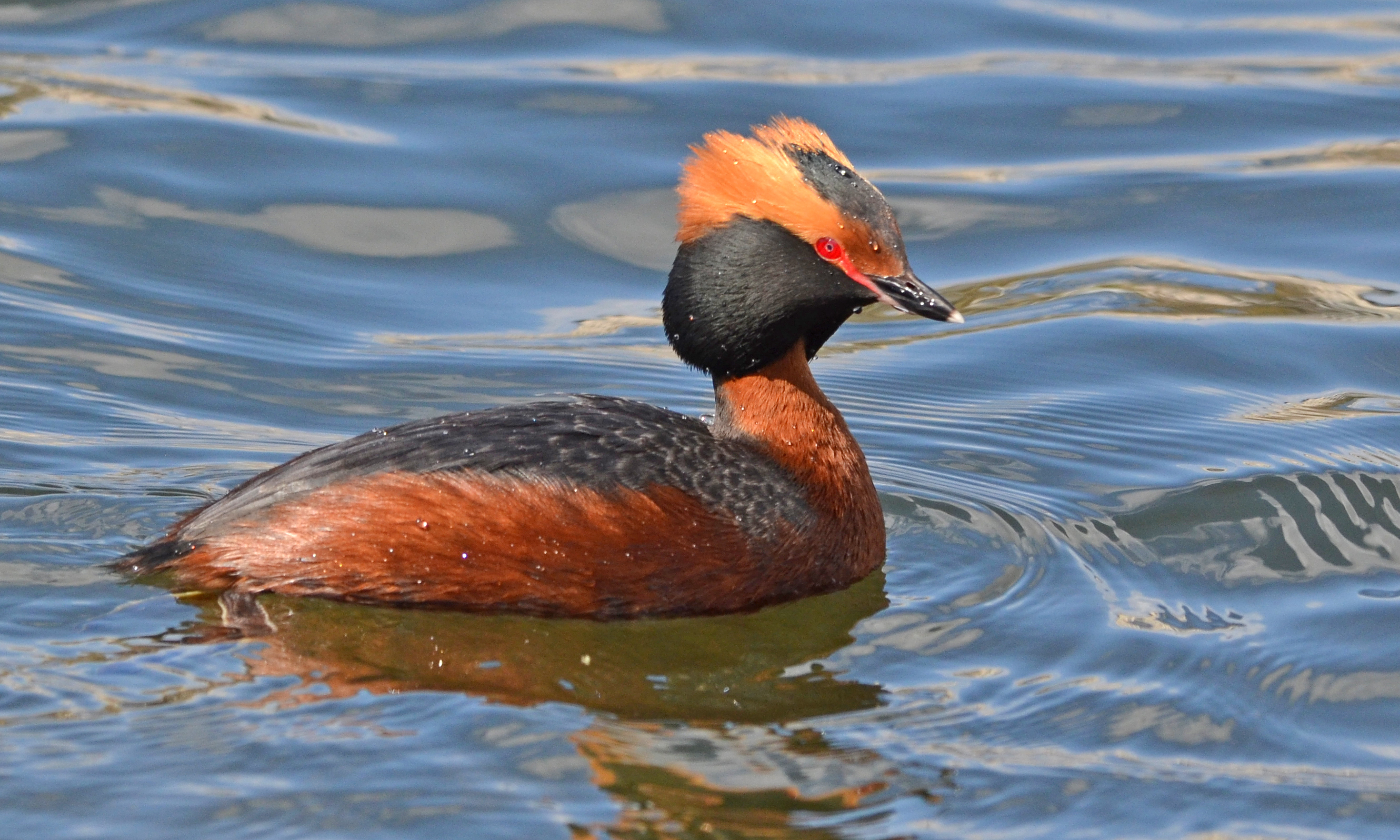
- Podiceps auritus auritus in breeding plumage in Saint Petersburg, Russia
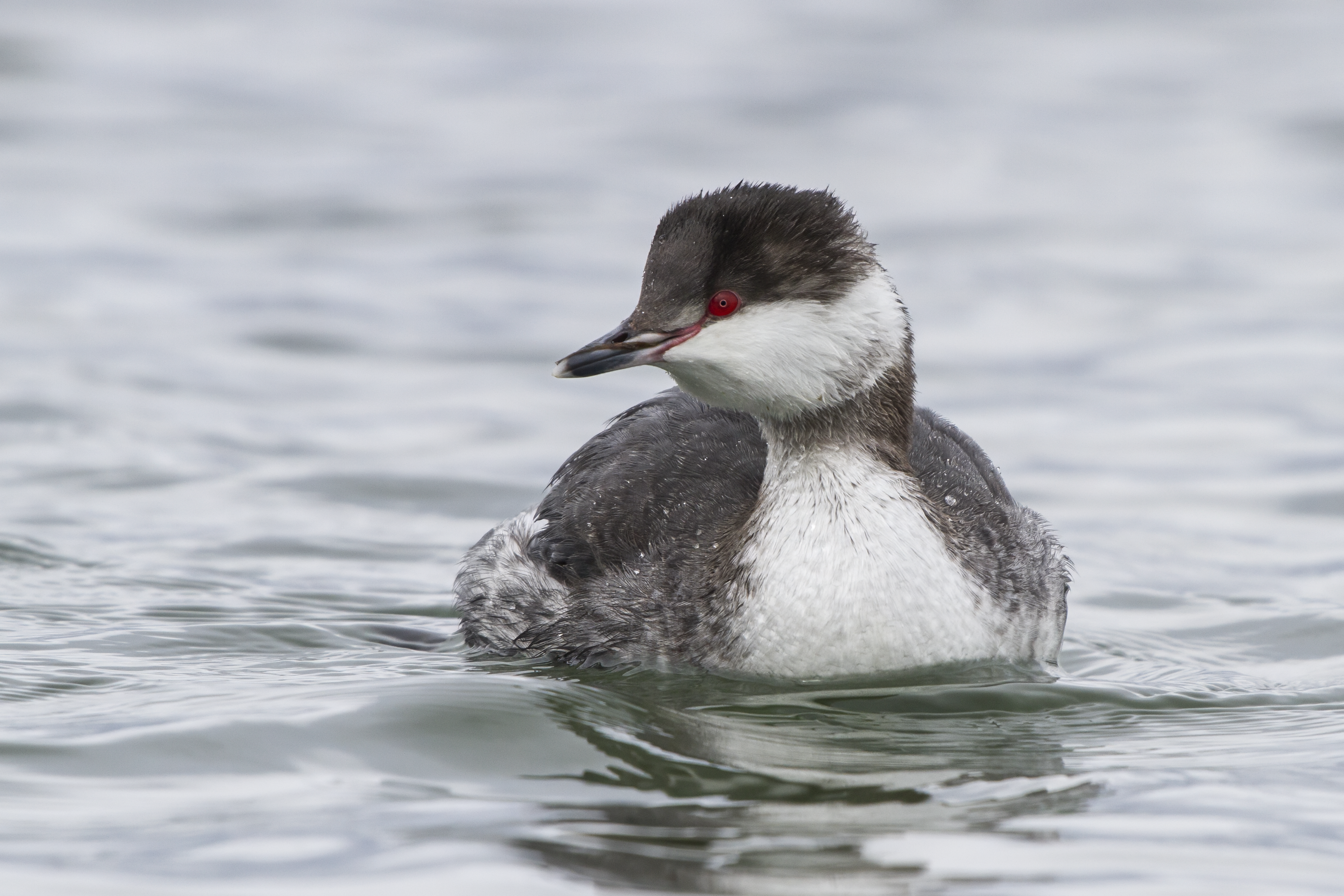
- Podiceps auritus cornutus in winter plumage in Scarborough Marsh, Maine.

Conservation status
- Vulnerable (IUCN 3.1)

Scientific classification
- Kingdom: Animalia
- Phylum: Chordata
- Class: Aves
- Order: Podicipediformes
- Family: Podicipedidae
- Genus: Podiceps
- Species: P. auritus

Binomial name
- Podiceps auritus (Linnaeus, 1758)
- Breeding range Winter range

Synonyms
- Colymbus auritus Linnaeus, 1758; Pliodytes lanquisti Murray, 1967; Podiceps dixi Brodkorp, 1963?; Podiceps howardae Storer, 2001?; Podiceps pisanus (Shufeldt, 1913)?

= Horned grebe =

Species of bird

The horned grebe or Slavonian grebe (Podiceps auritus) is a relatively small and threatened species of waterbird in the family Podicipedidae. There are two subspecies, P. a. auritus (Slavonian grebe), which breeds in Eurasia, and P. a. cornutus (horned grebe), which breeds in North America. The Eurasian subspecies is distributed over most of northern Europe and northern Asia, breeding from Iceland east to the Russian Far East. The North American subspecies spans most of Canada and some of the United States. A small population was cited in Greenland in 1973, but is not mapped or further mentioned by subsequent authors.

The American name 'horned' refers to the orange-yellow crest feathers located above and behind the eyes, called "horns". The English name, originally 'Sclavonian', is first attested by George Montagu in his 1802 Ornithological Dictionary, from Scalovia, an old name for northern Prussia, referring to the species' main breeding area in Europe; the spelling was emended (without any reason given) to the current 'Slavonian' by Hartert in 1912.

== Taxonomy ==
The horned grebe was formally described in 1758 by the Swedish naturalist Carl Linnaeus in the tenth edition of his Systema Naturae under the binomial name Colymbus auritus. Linnaeus specified the type locality as Europe and America but this has been restricted to Vaasa in Finland. The horned grebe is now one of the nine species placed in the genus Podiceps that was introduced in 1787 by the English naturalist John Latham. The genus name combines the Latin podex meaning "vent" and pes meaning "foot". The specific epithet auritus is Latin meaning "-eared" or "long-eared", and the subspecific name cornutus means "horned".

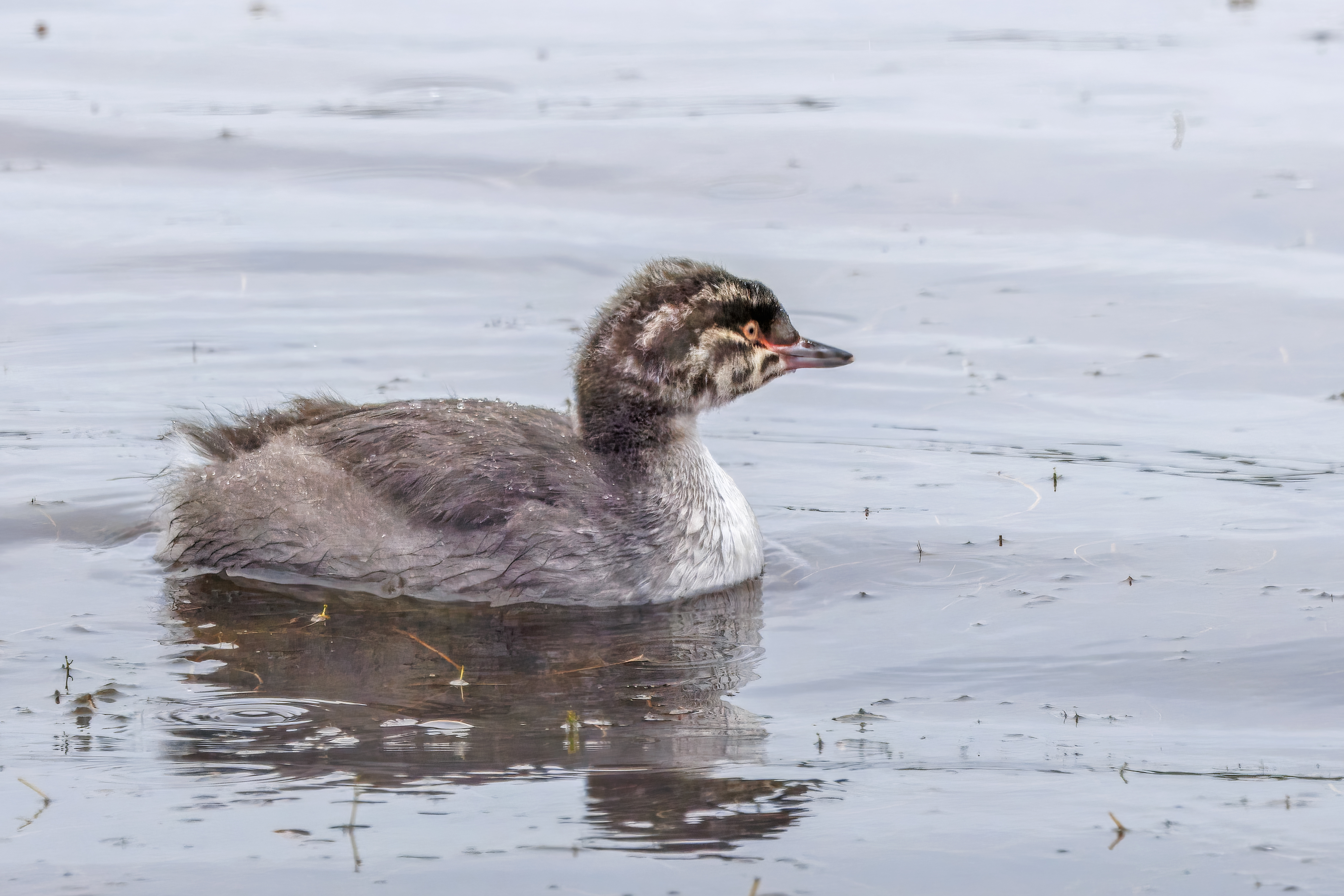
juvenile P. a. auritus

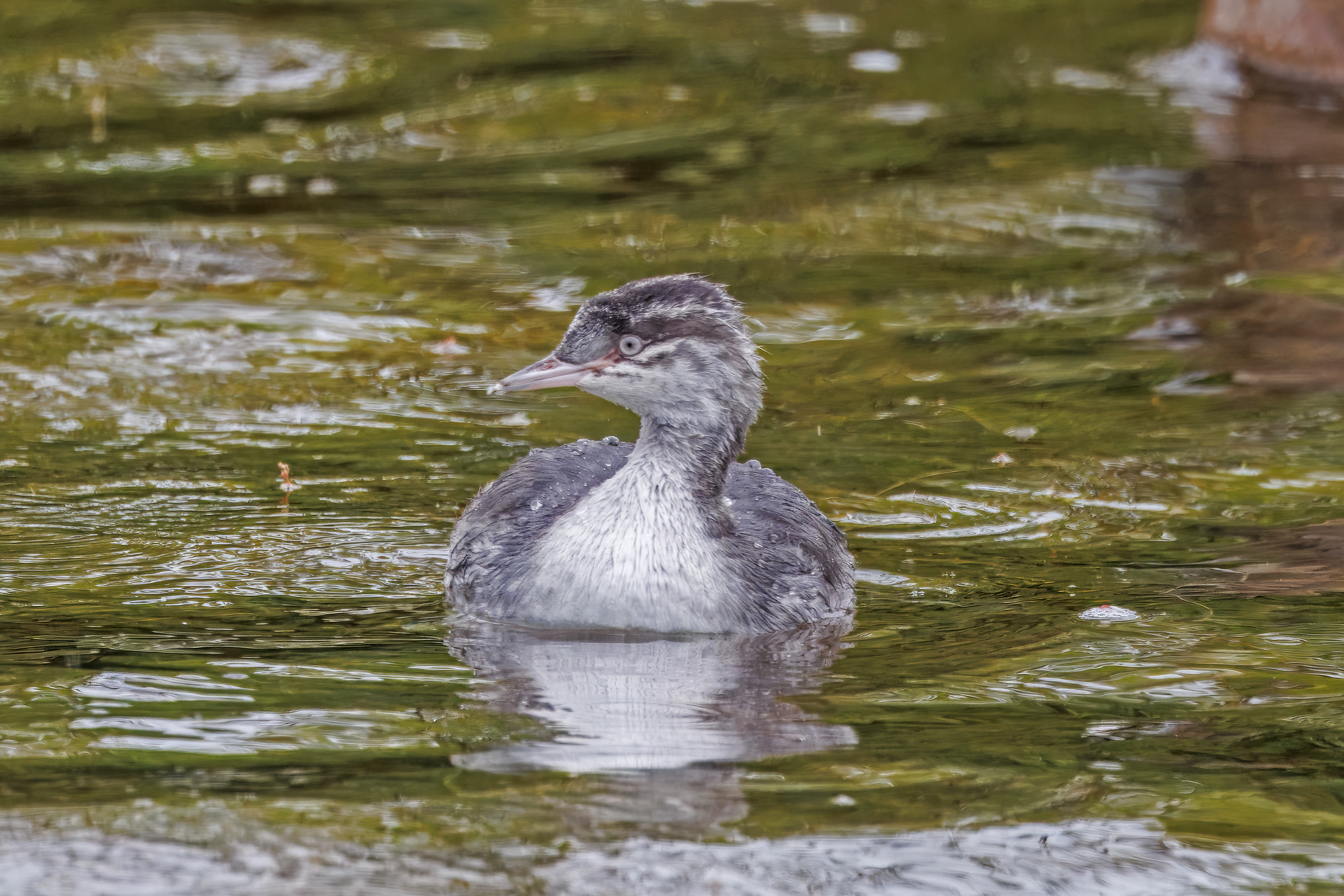
immature P. a. auritus

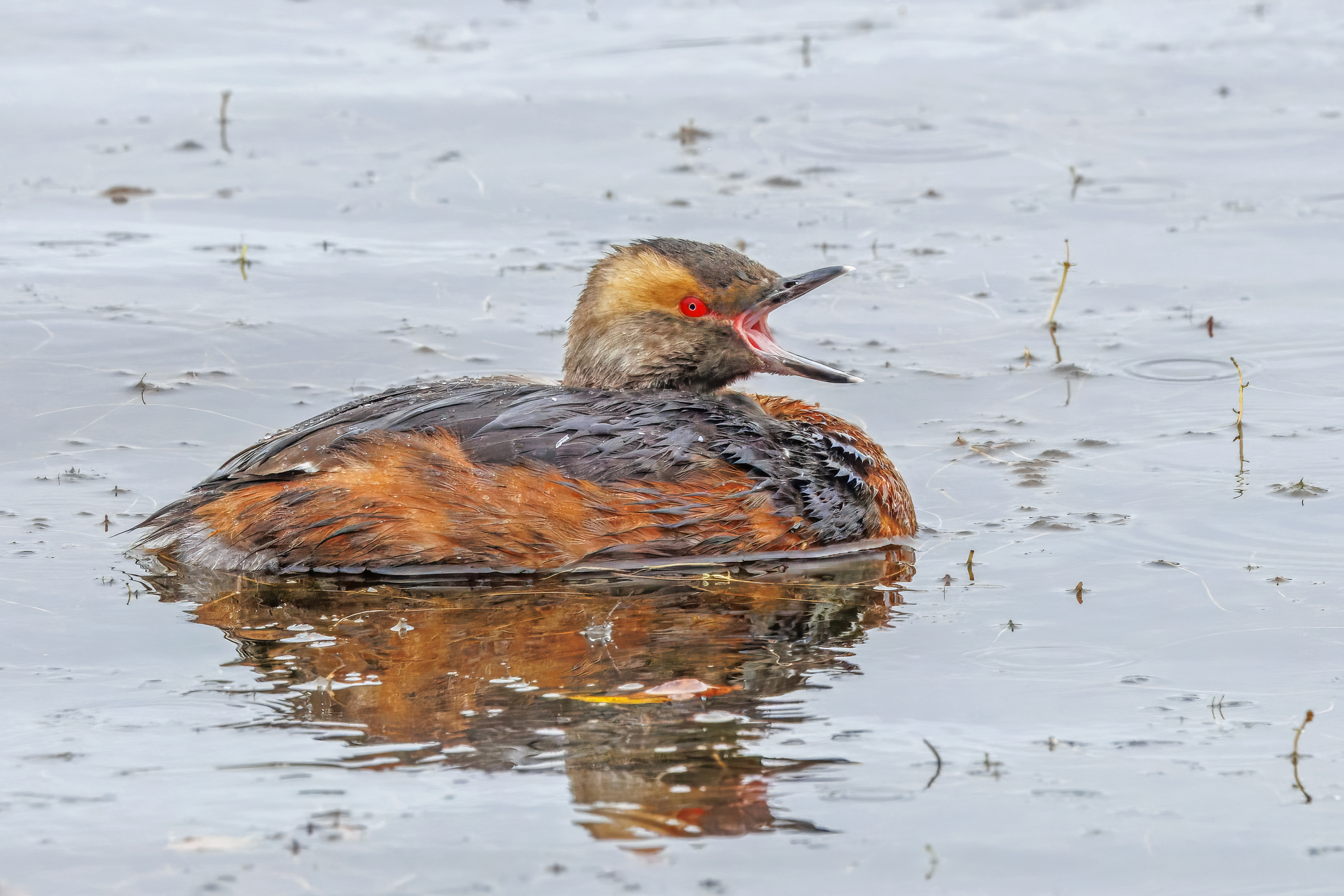
adult P. a. auritus in moult from breeding to winter plumage, calling

== Description ==
The species can be recognised by its orange-red and black breeding plumage, its black and white non-breeding plumage, and its characteristic "horns". It is 31–38 cm (12–15 in) long, has a wingspan 55–74 cm (22–29 in) wide and weighs 300–570 g (11–20 oz). It has a moderately long neck, flat forehead and a rear crown of black feathers. Its beak is straight and pointed, with a white tip.

The breeding plumage has bright erectable "horns", black fan-shaped cheek feathers and an overall red-and-black colour. The neck, flanks, lores and upper-chest are chestnut brown, while the crown and back are black. The belly is a dull white. Males are slightly larger and brighter than females but are generally indistinguishable.

The non-breeding plumage is overall black and white. The neck, chest and cheeks are white, while the back and crown are a dull black-grey. The border between the crown and the cheeks extend in a straight line behind the eyes. The winter plumage does not have the "horns".

Juveniles appear similar to a non-breeding adult except they are a slightly duller shade of white and their back is tinged with brown. The line separating the cheeks and crown is less distinct and their beak is paler. The chicks are fluffy, with a dull grey back, a white belly and distinct black-and-white facial and neck striping.

=== Subspecies and distribution ===
Two subspecies are accepted:

Summer	Winter	Scientific name	Common name	Summer distribution	Winter distribution
		P. a. auritus (Linnaeus, 1758)	Slavonian grebe	Small populations in Iceland, Scotland, and Norway, and extensively from Sweden eastwards through Russia, northern Kazakhstan and northwest Mongolia to the Russian Far East in south Chukotka, Sakhalin and the Kamchatka Peninsula (east Russia)	Inshore waters of the Atlantic coast of Europe from Iceland and Norway south to northwestern France, in the eastern Mediterranean Sea, the Black Sea, and the Caspian Sea, and the Pacific coasts of Asia from northern Japan, Korea, south to eastern China.
		P. a. cornutus (Gmelin, JF, 1789)	Horned grebe	Subarctic south and central Alaska mainland, central and western Canada from Yukon east to northwestern Ontario, but also a small disjunct population on the Magdalene Islands in the Gulf of St. Lawrence in Quebec, and the northern tier of west-central contiguous USA states from northeastern Washington to Minnesota	Inshore waters of the Pacific and Atlantic coasts of North America, from southern Alaska south to California and the northern Gulf of California, and Nova Scotia south to Texas.

The subspecies are physically similar in measurements, but differ subtly in plumage, with P. a. auritus darker, having a blacker back and crown, and orange-yellow lateral crown tufts in breeding plumage; and P. a. cornuta paler, with greyer back and crown, and straw-yellow tufts.

A third subspecies P. a. arcticus Boie, 1822 has sometimes been accepted for the population in coastal Norway, Iceland, and Scotland, but is now treated as synonymous with nominate P. a. auritus.

In winter plumage, it is often confused with the black-necked grebe, which is only slightly smaller in size and has similar colouring but is differentiated by a steeper forehead, a more slender, slightly uptilted bill, duskier cheeks, and a fluffier rump.

=== Vocalisation ===
Young begin calling for begging purposes in a slightly trilled peeping noise, similar to that of a domestic chick. As they mature, their song changes to a more adult-like chittering. Their typical advertising call is loud and nasally "aaarrh" descending in a pitch and ending in a trill. They use other calls during copulation, alarm and breeding ceremonies that are slightly variable from the advertising call. Horned grebes are extremely vocal during breeding, territory establishment and defence. Their song is subdued during autumn migration and at wintering sites.

== Habitat ==
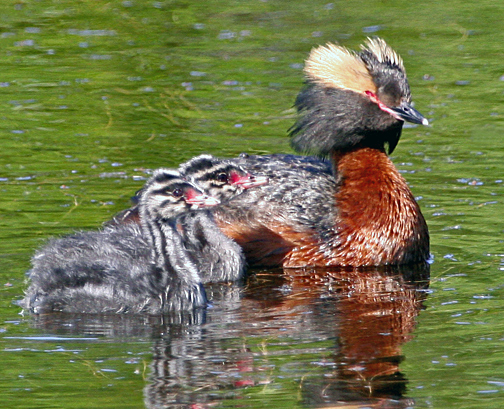
Chicks swimming alongside an adult P. a. cornutus in breeding plumage, Alaska

The species breeds primarily in boreal and subarctic regions with a frost-free period of around 90 days or less, but also in temperate zones, including prairies and parklands. They breed in small to moderately sized (0.5-10 ha) shallow freshwater ponds, marshes and shallow bays on lake edges with beds of emergent vegetation. They prefer lakes less than 2.5 m deep, with submerged vegetation, rather than bare gravel, silt or mud lakefloors, and marginal vegetation with sedgess, rushes, and bulrushes along with large areas of open water. This habitat provides a suitable site for nest material, anchorage, concealment and protection for young. It readily uses lakes surrounded by trees or forest.

During migration, they will stop along lakes, rivers and marshes. Following migration, they winter in marine environments, including off estuaries and bays or sandy beaches; in some places, for example in Norway, large numbers congregate on inland lakes.

== Behaviour ==
=== Food and feeding ===
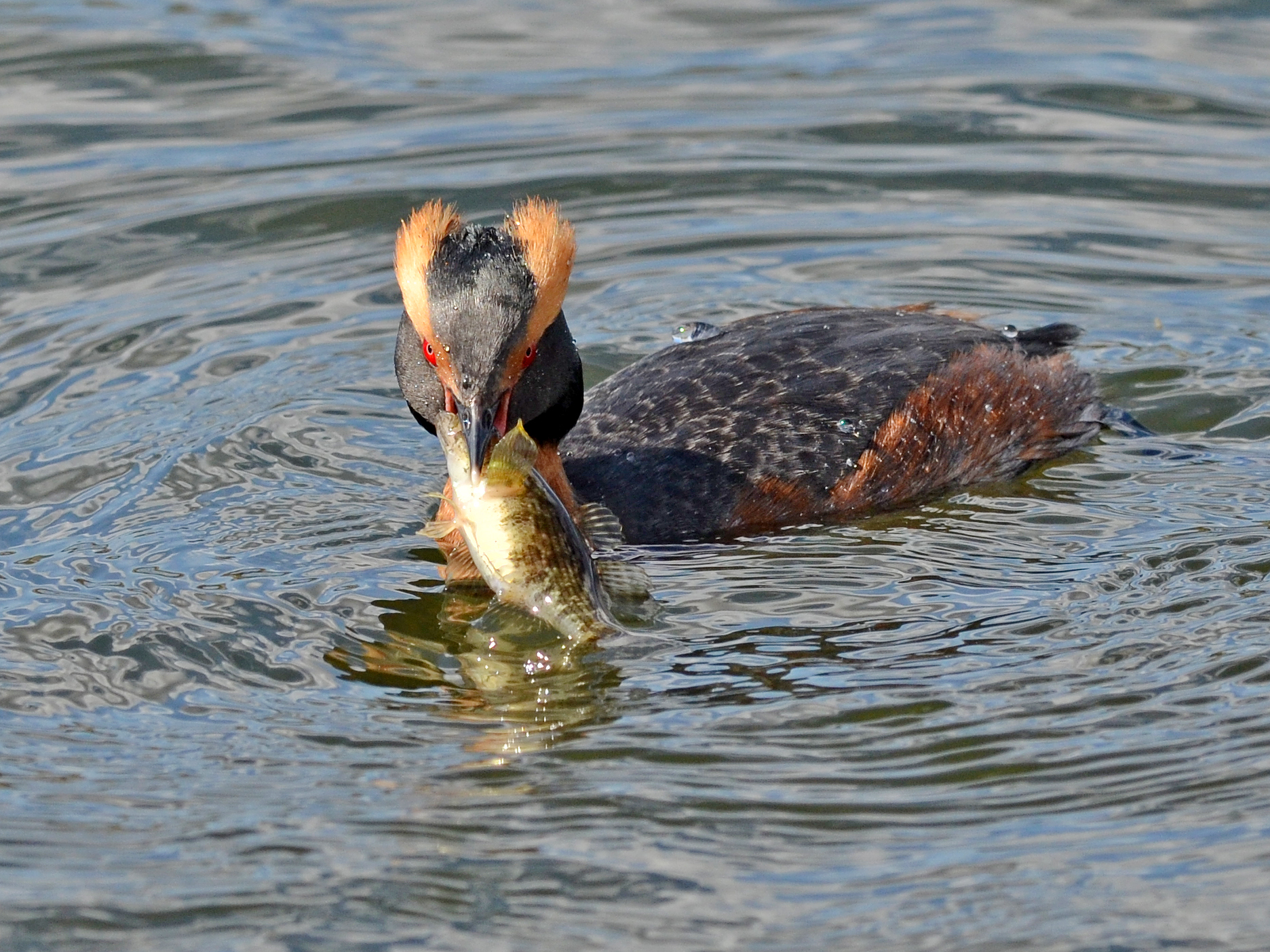
A Slavonian grebe P. a. auritus with a recently caught fish, Saint Petersburg, Russia

Horned grebes dive underwater using their large feet for agile manoeuvrability to feed on aquatic arthropods, fish and crustaceans. They will also catch airborne insects on the water's surface. Underwater they swallow or capture large prey and re-emerging at the surface to manipulate the fish headfirst. They usually feed solitarily or in small groups of up to five individuals. During the summer, aquatic and airborne arthropods are preferred, whereas winter selection favours fish and crustaceans.

As with other grebes, the horned grebe has an adaptation for swallowing fish whole. They will eat their own feathers from a young age, so that their stomach has a matted plug that functions as a filter to hold fish bones until digestion.

=== Breeding ===
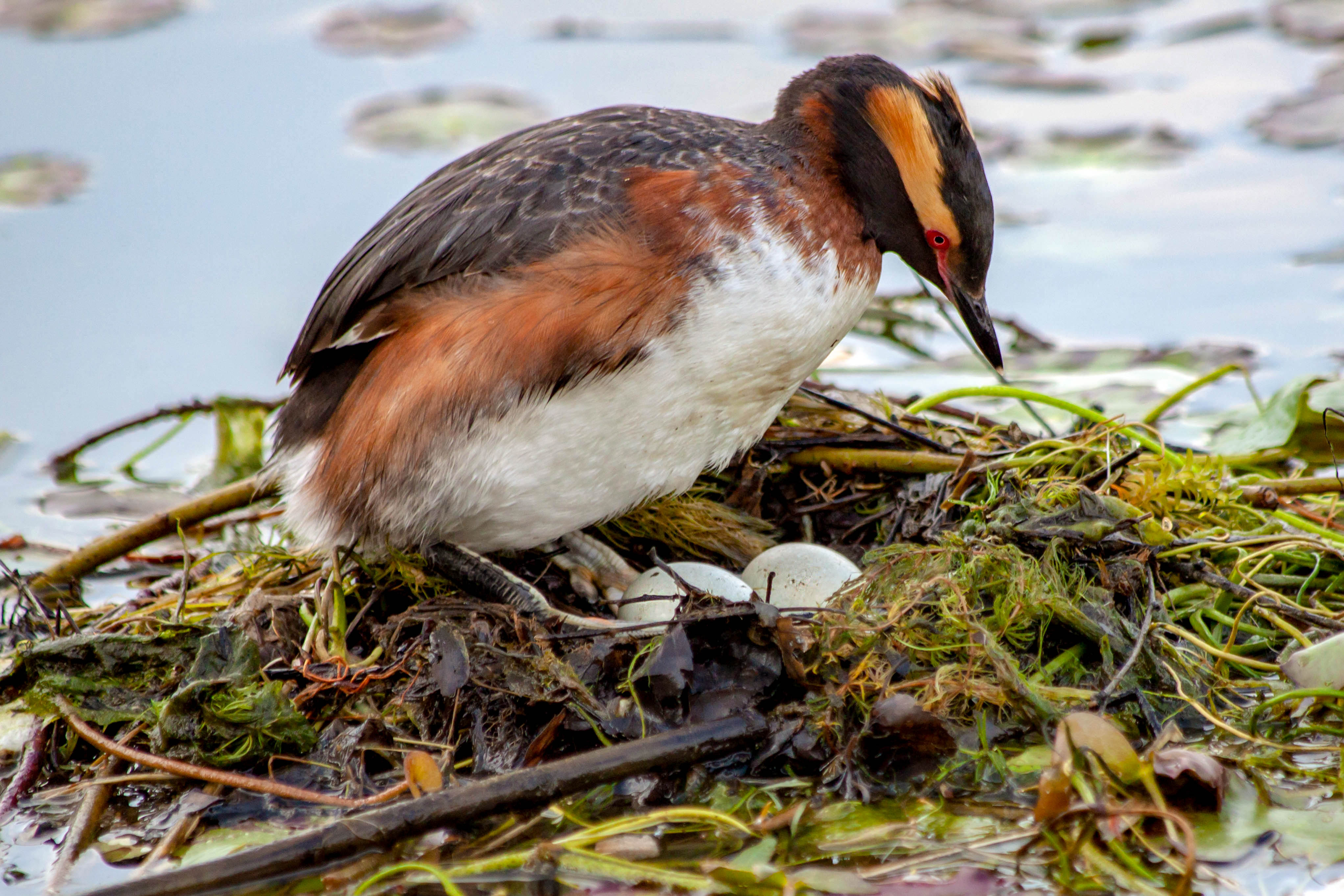
Adult P. a. auritus on nest with two eggs, Russia

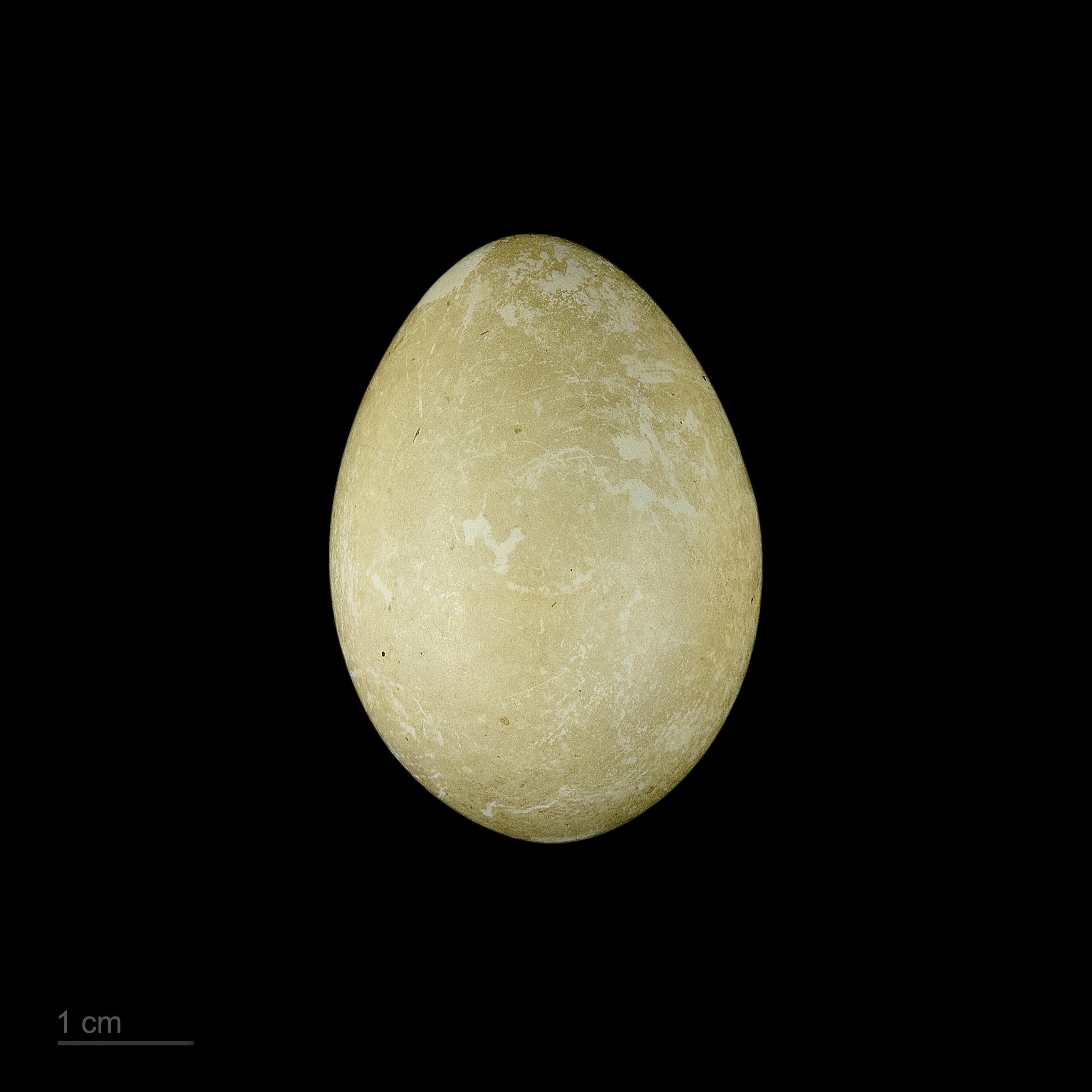
Egg at Muséum de Toulouse

Horned grebes are monogamous and develop their relationship through elaborate mating routines. There are four pair bonding ceremonies; discovery ceremony, weed ceremony, head-shaking ceremony and triumph ceremony. The discovery ceremony begins with advertising displays, which include an upright posture, erect "horns" and sounding of their advertising call. Then, both male and female engage in bouts of penguin dance and preening. This initial pair bonding ceremony is to ensure correct species identification, sex and compatibility. The weed ceremony follows the completion of a successful discovery ceremony. The male and female will dive, retrieve weeds and rise in synchronisation. The pair will come breast-to-breast with their weeds then turn side by side to continue swimming. This weed-rush can continue multiple times until both individuals are satisfied. Finally, the head-shaking ceremony and triumph ceremony are performed for primarily established pairs. Once copulation is to take place, it always occurs on a platform nest built by the pair.

Horned grebes usually arrive at breeding grounds in pairs or solitarily to seek out a mate in the spring or early summer. A pair may nest entirely alone or in a loose colony that typically contains approximately 20 breeding pairs, each pair nesting some distance from the others. During nesting, horned grebes are known to defend their nests very aggressively. Nests are built from plant matter and are most commonly affixed to emergent vegetation otherwise built on land or in shallow open water. Depending on location the eggs are laid between April and September, with June being the most common month. The females lays a single clutch of three to eight eggs, which are coloured white, brownish or blueish green. These eggs measure 4.5 cm × 3 cm (1.8 in × 1.2 in) on average across large sample sizes, although the dimensions have been cited higher in other sources. Both males and females share incubation time for 22 to 25 days. When the young hatch, they can swim and dive within the first few days, although they must be kept warm by their parents for up to 14 days. During this time, the juvenile chicks can often be seen riding on the backs of their swimming parents right in-between the wing and the back. Later the horned grebe will take their first flight at 55–60 days old. The species finally reaches sexual maturity at two years old.

== Conservation status ==
The total North American population is estimated at between 200,000 and 500,000 individuals and the Eurasian population at 12,900 to 18,500 mature individuals. The global population has declined by 30% over the last three decades and by 79% within North America. This is due primarily to human disturbance, forestry operations around breeding sites, fluctuating water levels, and stocking of lakes with rainbow trout that compete for aquatic insects. They are also frequently caught in nets, vulnerable to oil spills and diseases. Between 1985 and 2001, grassland and wetland drainage amounted to 5% global habitat loss. The western Canadian population is listed as being of special concern and the breeding population on Magdalen Islands is listed as endangered. Due to global declines, the International Union for Conservation of Nature uplisted the status from least concern to vulnerable in 2015, resulting in conservation and research action plans. The small population in northern Scotland is in severe decline, with only 26 pairs in 2021, a decline of 58% over the previous 26 years.

== Fossils ==
A handful of fossil species, such as the Pliocene aged P. howardae, P. pisanus and P. solidus, and the Pleistocene aged P. dixi have been described to be related to or perhaps some of them might be pre-Holocene material of the horned grebe. However while P. howardae and P. dixi are regularly recognized as fossil material of the horned grebe by some authors, P. pisanus and P. solidus are argued to be valid species that are close to the ancestry of the horned grebe.
