= Aondelphis =

Aondelphis Temporal range: Early Miocene

Scientific classification
- Kingdom: Animalia
- Phylum: Chordata
- Class: Mammalia
- Infraclass: Placentalia
- Order: Artiodactyla
- Infraorder: Cetacea
- Superfamily: Platanistoidea
- Genus: †Aondelphis
- Species: †A. talen

Binomial name
- †Aondelphis talen Viglino et al., 2018

Extinct genus of cetaceans

Aondelphis is an extinct genus of cetacean that inhabited Argentina during the Early Miocene and contains the species A. talen.
