= Atitlán grebe =

- Photo by David G. Allen

Conservation status
- Extinct (1989) (IUCN 3.1)
- CITES Appendix I

Scientific classification
- Kingdom: Animalia
- Phylum: Chordata
- Class: Aves
- Order: Podicipediformes
- Family: Podicipedidae
- Genus: Podilymbus
- Species: †P. gigas

Binomial name
- †Podilymbus gigas Griscom, 1929

Extinct species of bird

The Atitlán grebe (Podilymbus gigas), also known as the giant grebe, giant pied-billed grebe or poc, is an extinct species of grebe that was endemic to Lago de Atitlán in Guatemala. Closely related to the pied-billed grebe, it inhabited the lake at an elevation of 1,700 m (5,600 ft). The species was described in 1929 by Ludlow Griscom from a specimen collected in 1926. American ecologist Anne LaBastille documented its population decline over a period of 25 years. The Atitlán grebe was declared extinct by 1990.

== Description ==
The Atitlán grebe measured approximately 46–50 cm (18–20 in) in length. Its appearance and vocalizations were similar to those of the much smaller pied-billed grebe. It had a large, pied bill with coloration that varied seasonally, appearing white in spring and brown during other seasons. The plumage was predominantly dark brown, with white-flecked flanks and grey ear coverts. The underparts were dark grey with white flecking while the head was nearly black. During spring, the neck was glossy and flecked with dark brown, becoming flecked with white in winter. The legs were slaty grey and the bill had a prominent black vertical band across its middle. The irises were brown. The species had relatively small wings and was flightless.

== Reproduction ==
The Atitlán grebe laid a clutch of four to five white eggs. Both parents participated in rearing the hatchlings.

== Extinction ==
The decline of the Atitlán grebe began following the introduction of smallmouth bass (Micropterus dolomieu) and largemouth bass (Micropterus nigricans) into Lake Atitlán in 1958 and again in 1960. These invasive species reduced populations of fish and crabs that constituted a significant portion of the grebe's diet and also preyed upon its chicks. Consequently, the population declined from an estimated 200 individuals in 1960 to approximately 80 by 1965. Following conservation efforts led by Anne LaBastille, a refuge was established in 1966, allowing the population to recover to 210 individuals by 1973.

As an aftermath of the 1976 Guatemala earthquake, fractures developed in the lakebed, allowing water to drain through an underwater outlet and causing the lake levels to fall. The resulting habitat changes contributed to a further decline in the Atitlán grebe population. By 1983, only 32 individuals remained, most of which were hybrids with the pied-billed grebe. The last two individuals were observed in 1989. Following their disappearance, the Atitlán grebe was officially declared extinct.

== See also ==
- Alaotra grebe, probably extinct since the late 1980s for analogous reasons.
- Colombian grebe
