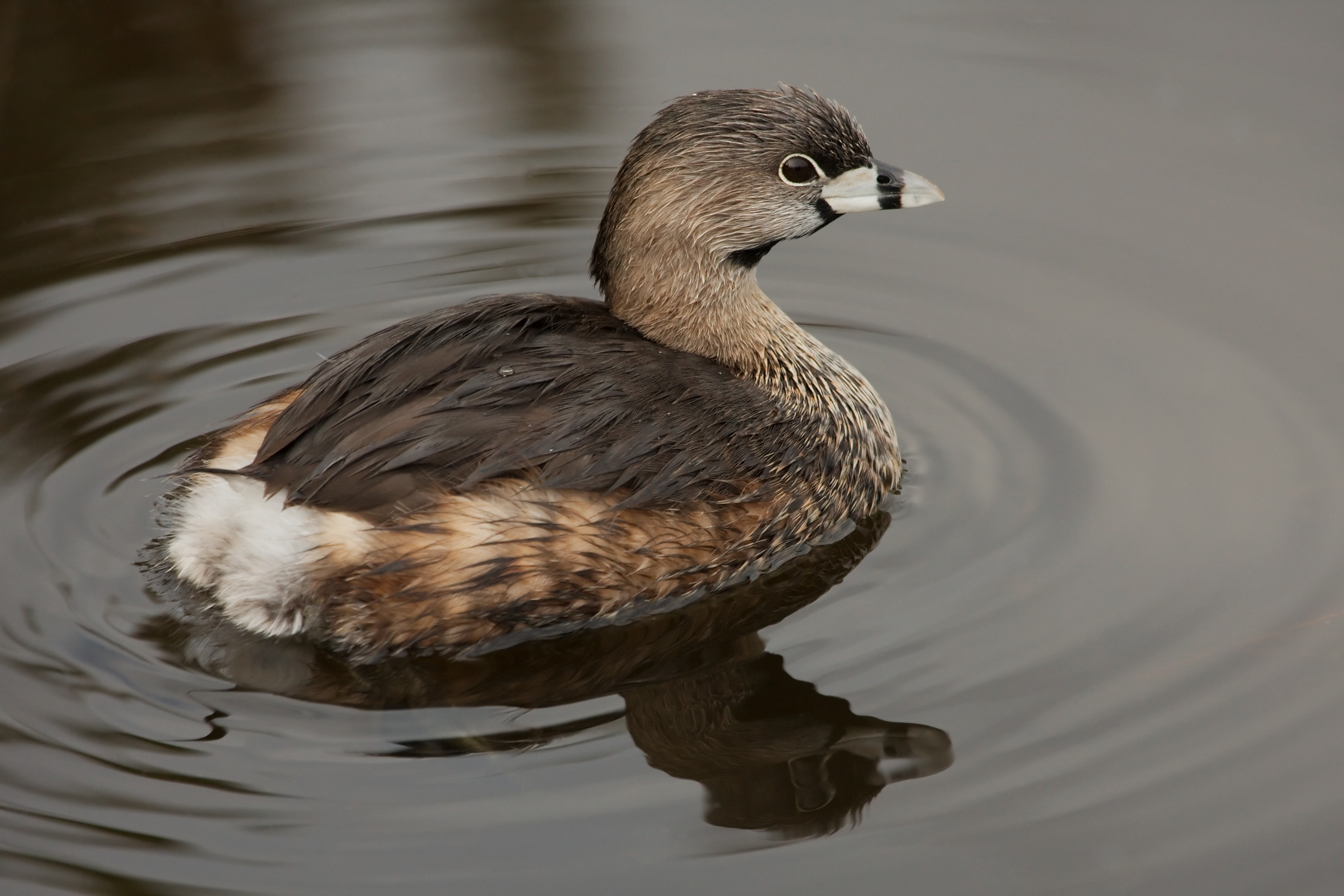
- P. p. podiceps, summer plumage
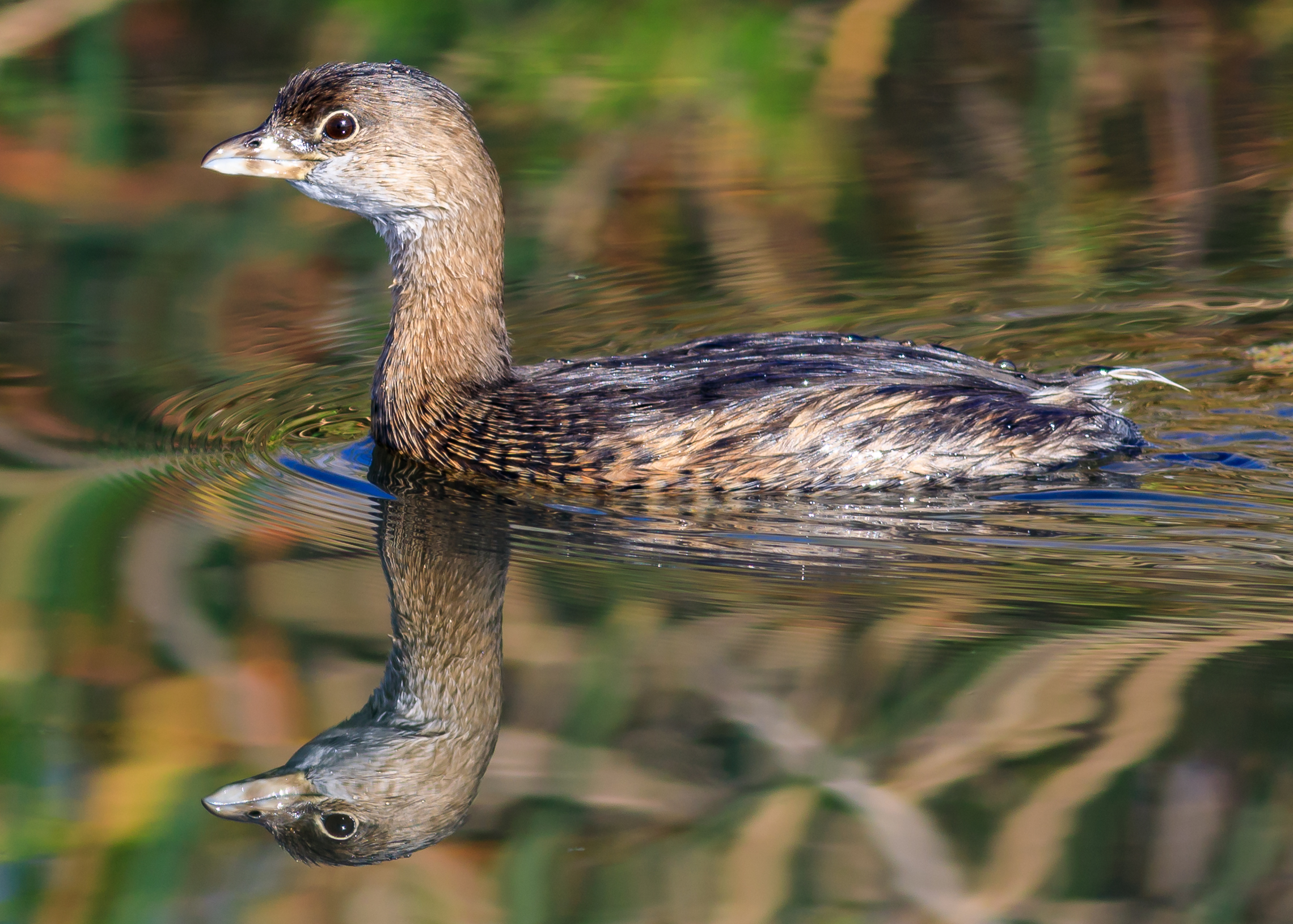
- P. p. podiceps, winter plumage

Conservation status
- Least Concern (IUCN 3.1)

Scientific classification
- Kingdom: Animalia
- Phylum: Chordata
- Class: Aves
- Order: Podicipediformes
- Family: Podicipedidae
- Genus: Podilymbus
- Species: P. podiceps

Binomial name
- Podilymbus podiceps (Linnaeus, 1758)
- Approximate distribution map Breeding Year-round Nonbreeding

Synonyms
- Colymbus podiceps Linnaeus, 1758

= Pied-billed grebe =

Species of bird

The pied-billed grebe (Podilymbus podiceps) is a species of the grebe family of water birds primarily found in ponds throughout the Americas.

== Taxonomy and name ==
The pied-billed grebe was described by Carl Linnaeus in the 10th edition of his Systema Naturae in 1758 as Colymbus podiceps. The binomial name is derived from Latin Podilymbus, a contraction of podicipes ("feet at the buttocks", from podici-, "rump-" + pes, "foot")—the origin of the name of the grebe order—and Ancient Greek kolymbos, "diver", and podiceps, "rump-headed", from podici- + Neo-Latin ceps.

Other names of this grebe include American dabchick, rail, dabchick, Carolina grebe, devil-diver, dive-dapper, dipper, hell-diver, pied-billed dabchick, pied-bill, thick-billed grebe, and water witch.

Since the extinction of the Atitlán grebe (Podilymbus gigas), the pied-billed grebe has become the sole extant member of the genus Podilymbus. Outside its own genus, the closest relatives of the pied-billed grebe are the small grebes of the genus Tachybaptus.

=== Subspecies ===
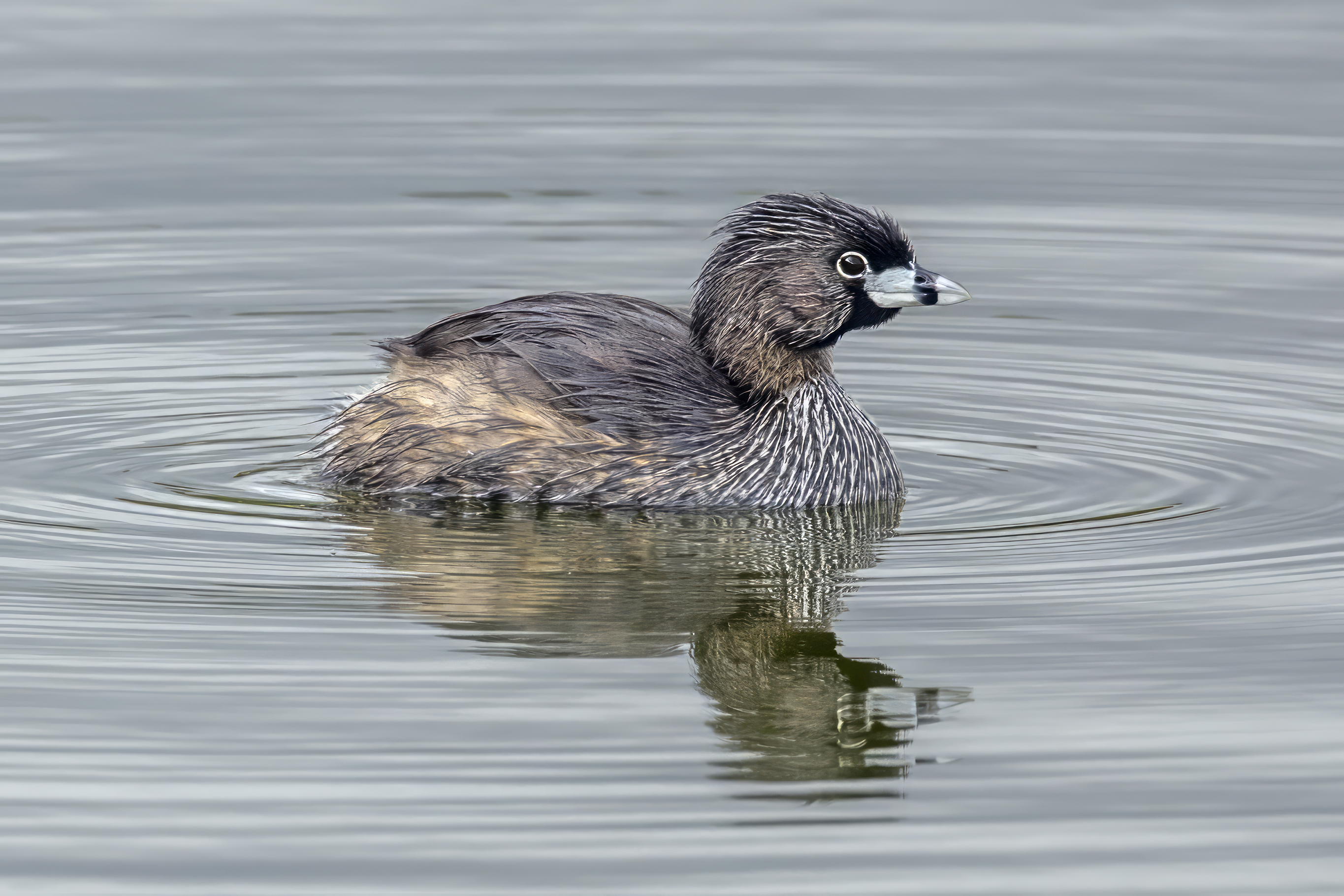
P. p. antarcticus in Colombia

The following subspecies are recognized:

- P. p. podiceps, (Linnaeus, 1758), nominate subspecies: continental North America, from Canada to Panama.
- P. p. antarcticus, (Lesson, 1842), South America, from Colombia to central Chile and Argentina.
- P. p. antillarum, (Bangs, 1913), Greater and Lesser Antilles.

== Description ==
Pied-billed grebes are small, stocky, and short-necked. They are 31–38 cm (12–15 in) in length, with a wingspan of 45–62 cm (18–24 in) and weigh 253–568 g (8.9–20.0 oz). They are mainly brown, with a darker crown and back. Their brown color serves as camouflage in the marshes they live in. They do not have white visible under their wings when flying, like other grebes. Their undertail is white and they have a short, blunt chicken-like bill that is a light grey color, which in summer is encircled by a broad black band (hence the name). In the summer, its throat is black. There is no sexual dimorphism. Juveniles have black and white stripes and look more like winter adults. This grebe does not have webbed feet. Its toes have lobes that come out of the side of each toe. These lobes allow for easy paddling. When flying, the feet appear behind the body due to the feet's placement in the far back of the body. Because of the feet placement, they are not able to walk on land.

These grebes may be confused with the least grebe, although that species is much smaller and has a thinner bill. Other similarly sized grebes are very distinct in plumage, i.e. the eared grebe and horned grebe. Both species bear much more colorful breeding plumage, with rufous sides, golden crests along the side of the head against contrasting slaty color (also a rufous neck in the horned); while in winter, both the eared and horned grebes are pied with slaty and cream color and have red eyes. Because of the pied-billed grebe's duck-like habits, some inexperienced observers may confuse it with a duck. However, pied-billed grebes have a very different bill shape (shorter, pointed at the tip, and flattened along the sides), as well as being shorter-necked and shorter-bodied than a duck. Also, unlike ducks, the closest living relatives of the grebe family are flamingos.

=== Vocalization ===
Its call is unique, loud and sounds like a "whooping kuk-kuk-cow-cow-cow-cowp-cowp". Its call is similar to the yellow-billed cuckoo.

== Distribution and habitat ==
They are most commonly found throughout North and Central America, the Caribbean, and South America year round. During the summer breeding season, they are most prevalent in central, northern and northeastern Canada. If they live in an area where the water freezes in the winter they will migrate. Migrating birds generally meet with year-round birds in September and October. They migrate at night. Most migratory birds leave in March or April. They make occasional appearances in Europe and Hawaii. In the United Kingdom, pied-billed grebe visits have numbered 45 sightings as of 2019, appearing generally in October to January. One bird in England bred with a little grebe, producing hybrid young. It is the only grebe on record to have visited the Galapagos Islands.

Pied-billed grebes are found in freshwater wetlands with emergent vegetation, such as cattails. They are occasionally found in salt water. When breeding they are found in emergent vegetation near open water, and in the winter they are primarily found in open water due to the lack of nests to maintain. They may live near rivers, but prefer still water. They may be found in higher elevations when migrating. They will breed in restored and man-made wetlands.

Pied-billed grebes live approximately 10–12 years.

== Behaviour ==
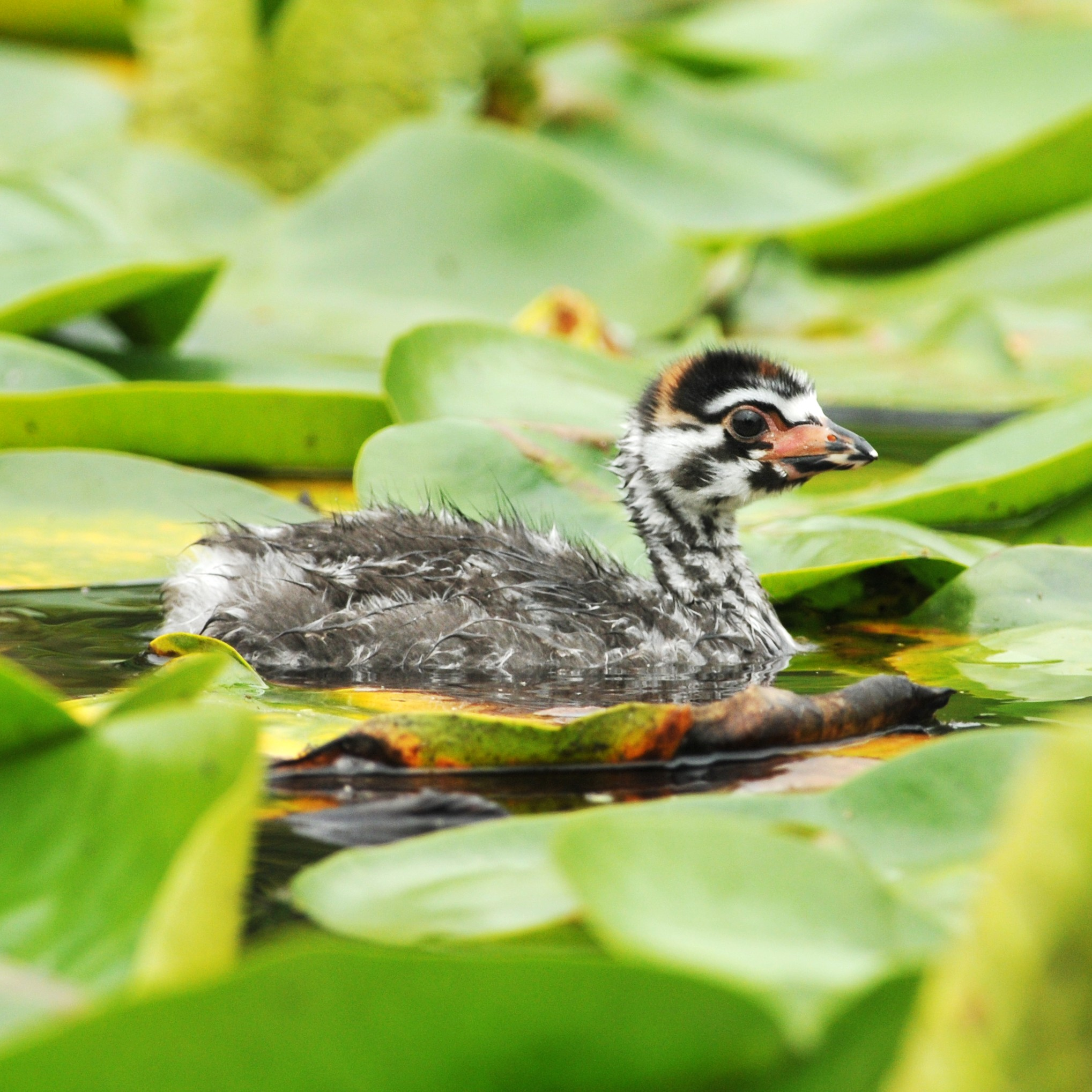
Chick swimming on Lake Washington

Pied-billed grebes rarely fly. They make a slow dive frequently, especially when in danger, diving to about 20 ft (6.1 m) or less. They dive for about 30 seconds and may move to a more secluded area of the water, allowing only the head to be visible to watch the danger dissipate. This frequency in diving has earned them the description of being reclusive or shy, and the nickname "hell-diver". Pied-billed grebes can trap air in their feathers, which controls their buoyancy. They rarely spend time in flocks. Their courtship include calling and sometimes duets. Males will show territorial behaviour if another male is at the edge of his territory. They face each other and then turn their heads and bills up. Then they turn away and start calling. Then they turn back around to look at one another.

=== Breeding ===
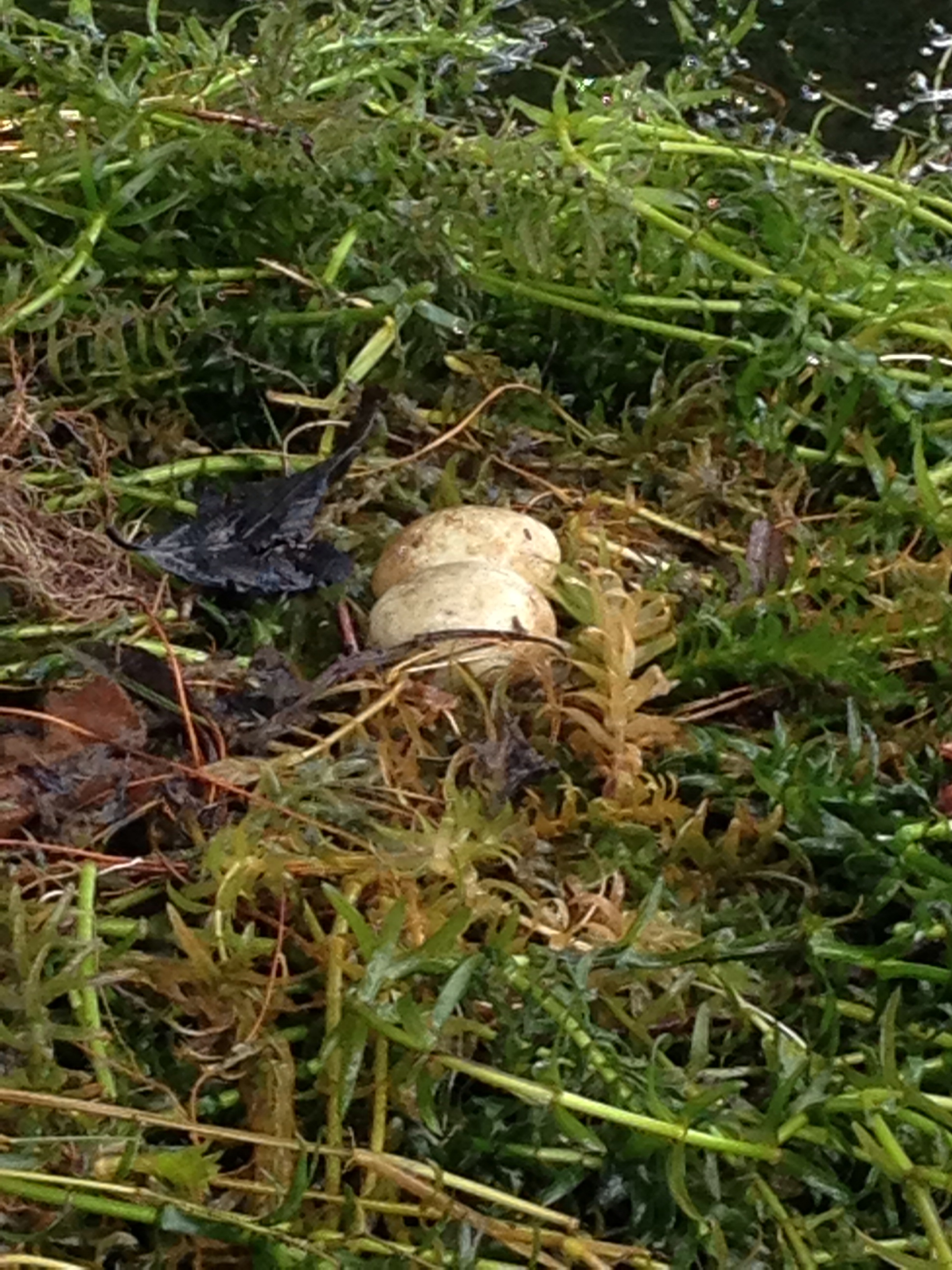
P. podiceps eggs at Bogotá's Simón Bolívar Park

The pied-billed grebe breeds in south-central Canada, throughout the United States, Central America, the Caribbean, and temperate South America. These grebes may lay up to two sets of eggs a year. Their nests sit on top of the water, their eggs sitting in vegetation that resides in the water. Grebes lay between three and ten bluish white smooth elliptical eggs with the female starting the incubation process. They are incubated for around 23 days by both parents, with the female taking over incubation duties towards the end of that time period. They will cover the nest with nesting material if they have to leave it for an extended period of time.

Young grebes may leave the nest within one day of hatching. They are downy at birth. Yellow skin is seen between the lore and top of the head. They do not swim well and stay out of the water. They sleep on their parents' backs. Within four weeks they start swimming. When alerted they will climb on the back of a parent grebe and eventually mature to dive under the water like their parents. Both parents share the role of raising the young – both feeding and carrying them on their backs. Sometimes the parents will dive underwater to get food with the chicks on their backs.

=== Diet ===
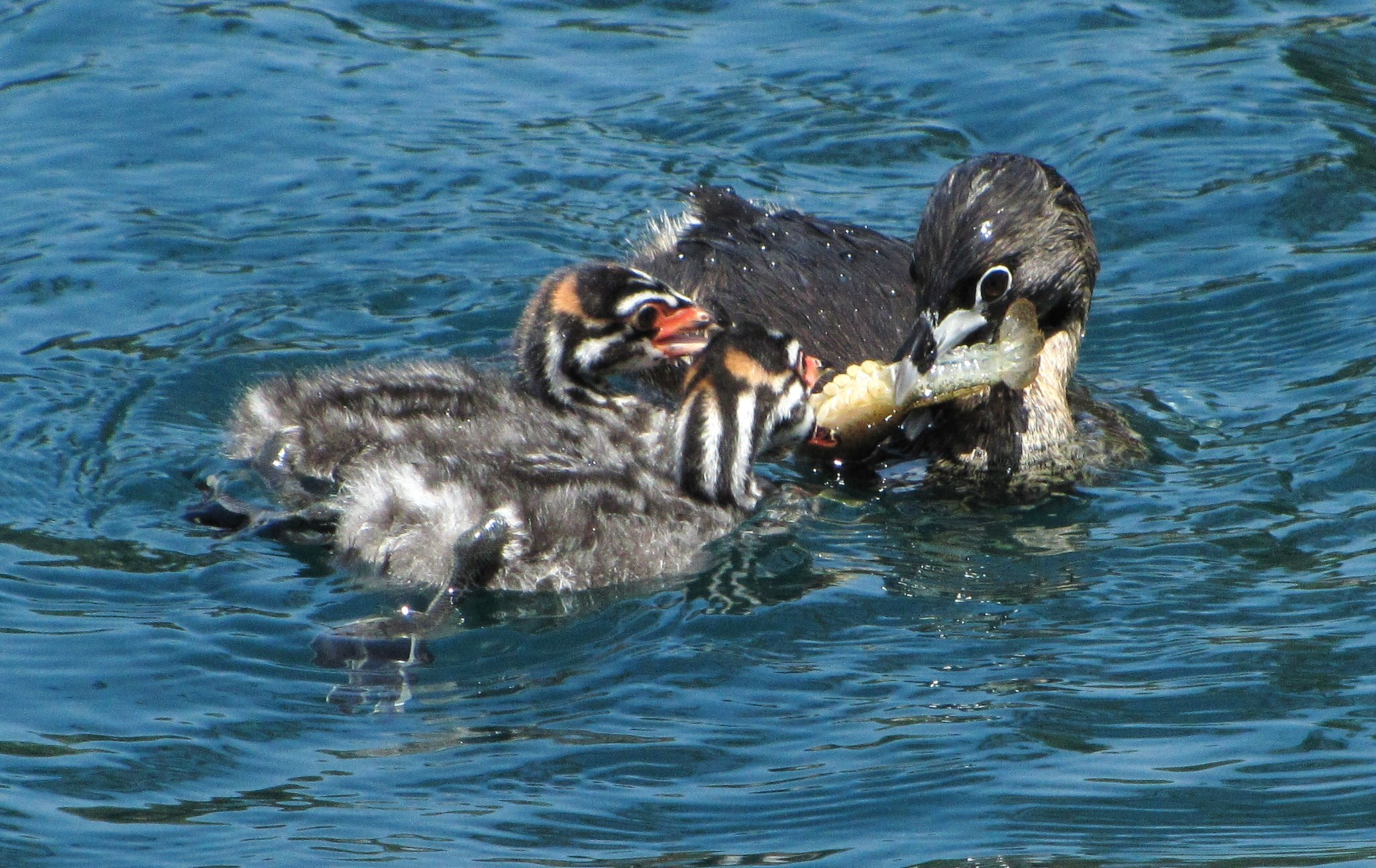
Adult with two juveniles feeding on a crawfish

Pied-billed grebes feed mainly on aquatic invertebrates, and also on small fish and amphibians (frogs, tadpoles). They dive to obtain food. Their bills allow them to crush crustaceans, like crawfish. They may also eat plants. They have been shown to eat their own feathers, like other grebes, to aid in digestion (prevent injury from small bones). They will also feed their feathers to their young.

=== Threats ===
They are extremely sensitive to disturbances, especially by humans. While breeding, if scared, adults may abandon their nests without protecting the eggs. The waves from boats can destroy the nests and their sounds easily frighten the birds.

== In culture ==
Pied-billed grebe feathers are thick and soft. Their feathers were formerly used as decorations on hats and earmuffs and they were hunted in the eastern United States, in the 19th century.

== Status ==
The status of pied-billed grebes in the Northeastern United States is precarious; they are declining in New England. The reasons are unknown. The states of Connecticut and New Hampshire have declared the pied-billed grebe as endangered. In New Jersey and Massachusetts, they have been declared threatened. In Vermont they are of "special concern". In Rhode Island they are extirpated. Pied-billed grebes are protected under the Migratory Bird Treaty Act of 1918.

Habitat loss is the grebe's biggest threat. The draining, filling, and general destruction of wetlands causes a loss in their breeding habitats. However, they are still common in the majority of their distribution areas, and as of 2021, their global population is believed to be increasing.
