= Pierce Brodkorb =

American ornithologist and paleontologist

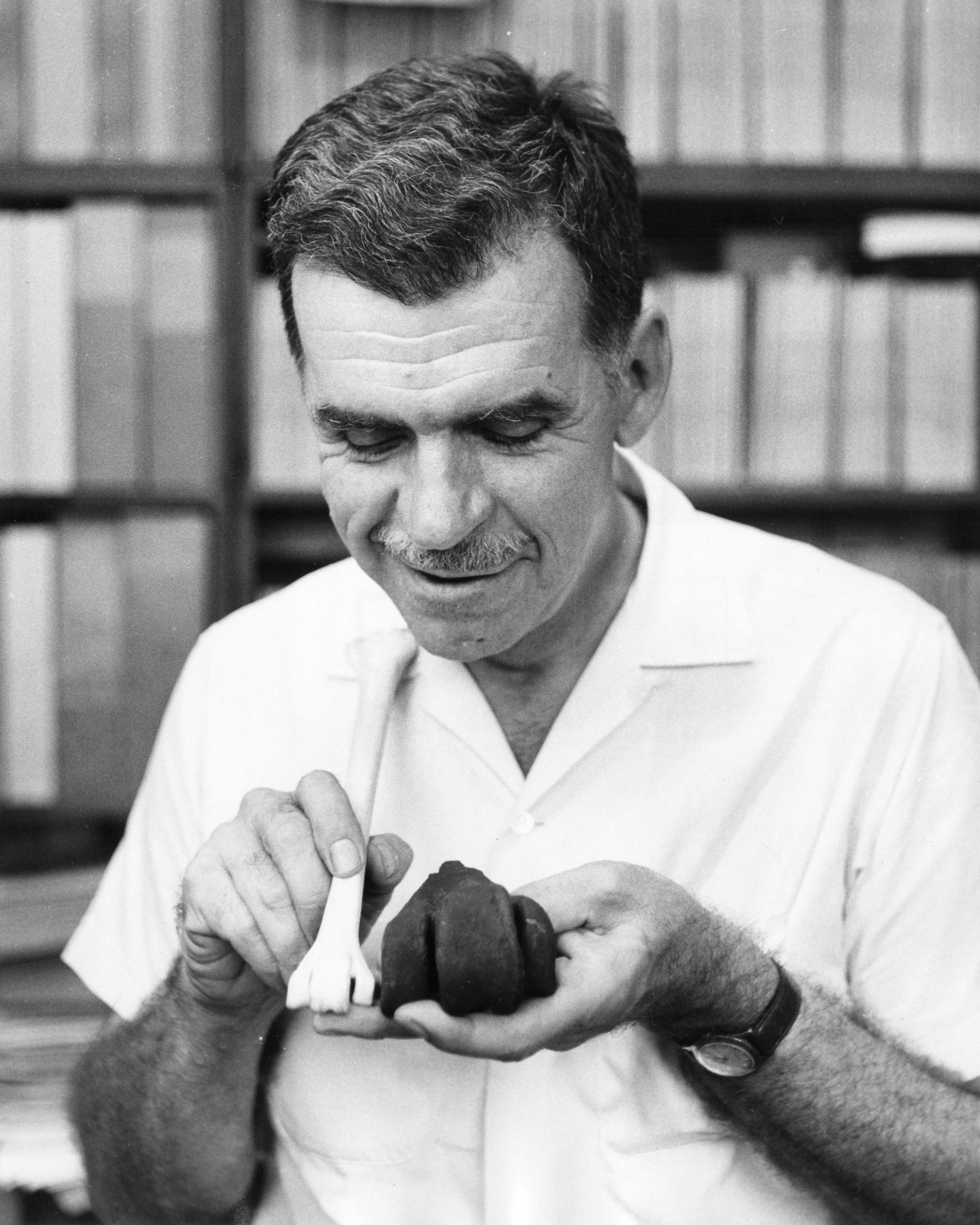
Pierce Brodkorb with the tarsometatarsus of Titanis (dark) and another bird

William Pierce Brodkorb (September 29, 1908, Chicago – July 18, 1992, Gainesville, Florida) was an American ornithologist and paleontologist.

Interested in birds since childhood, he was taught to prepare birds at the age of 16. Later, he received the opportunity to work as a staff technician in the Ornithology Division of the Field Museum. He entered the University of Michigan in 1933 and obtained his PhD degree in 1936.

Subsequently, he became an assistant curator of birds at the Museum of Zoology in Michigan until 1946. In 1946, he accepted a professorate in the Department of Zoology at the University of Florida in Gainesville, a position he held until his retirement in 1989. His doctoral students include Glen E. Woolfenden.

From the 1950s, Brodkorb built up a huge collection of bird fossils from the Miocene, the Pliocene, and the Pleistocene of Florida, which included 12,500 skeletons from 129 families, and is on display at the Florida Museum of Natural History, part of the University of Florida. From 1963 to 1978, he published the Catalogue of Fossil Birds in five volumes. In 1982, he became an honorary member of the Florida Ornithological Society.

Brodkorb described several prehistoric bird genera, such as Alexornis, Eostrix, and Titanis, for the first time. A number of taxa were named in his honour – usually employing his name as a specific epithet – e.g. Aegolius acadicus brodkorbi, Empidonax fulvifrons brodkorbi, Henocitta brodkorbi or Paraptenodytes brodkorbi.

More unusual is the case of the enigmatic fossil bird Foro panarium: Latin forō means "[I] pierce [a hole into something]", and panarium is the Roman term for a basket to store bread – in German (whence Brodkorb's family name originated) a Brotkorb. Hence, Foro panarium is the Latin translation of "Brodkorb Pierce", as the genus name can be considered the equivalent of a person's family name. Storrs Olson, in naming F. panarium, would have preferred the correct sequence of names (i.e. "Panarium foro"), but the genus name Panarium had already been used by Ernst Haeckel for some spumellarian radiolarians.
