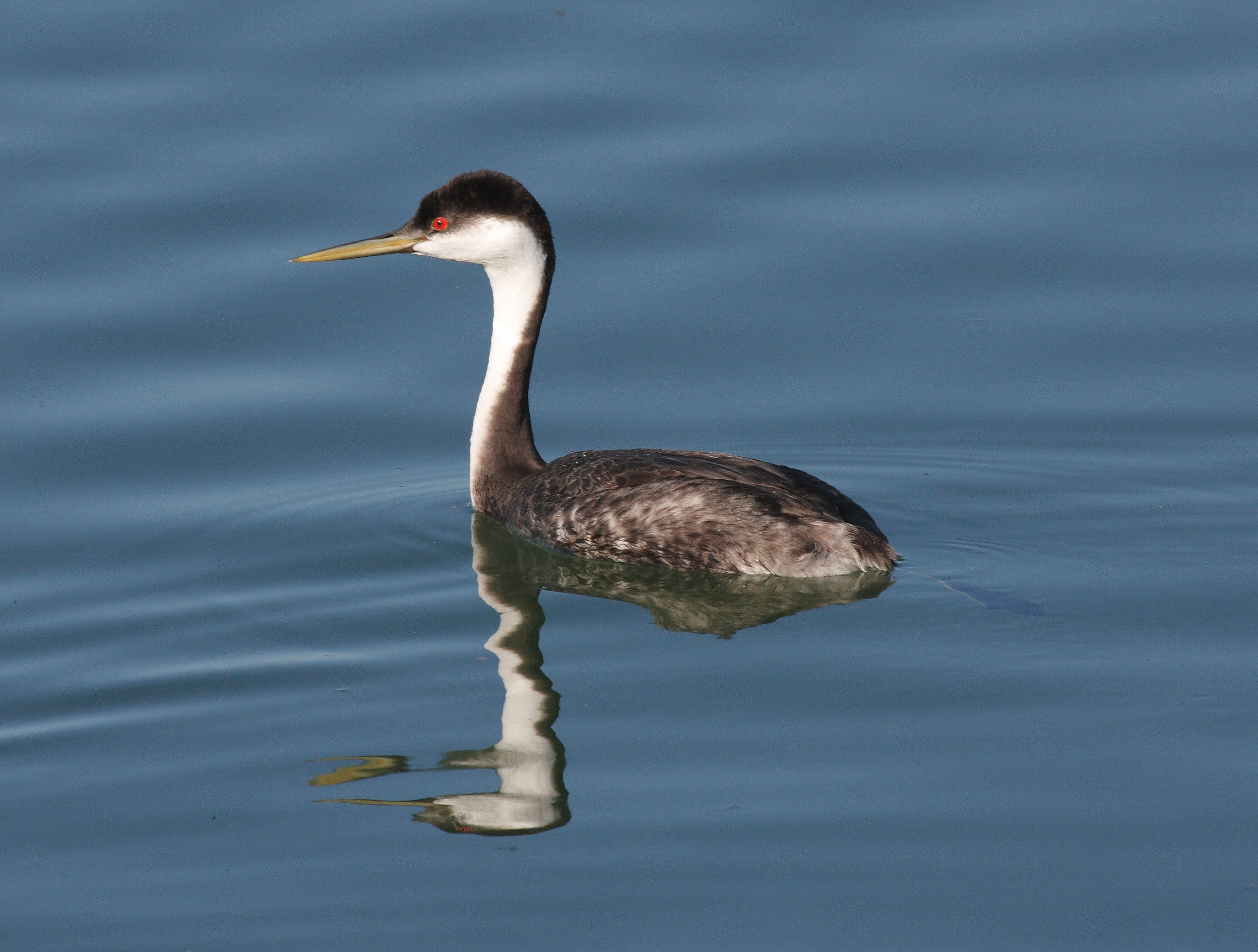

Conservation status
- Least Concern (IUCN 3.1)

Scientific classification
- Kingdom: Animalia
- Phylum: Chordata
- Class: Aves
- Order: Podicipediformes
- Family: Podicipedidae
- Genus: Aechmophorus
- Species: A. occidentalis

Binomial name
- Aechmophorus occidentalis (Lawrence, 1858)
- Approximate distribution map Breeding Migration Year-round Nonbreeding

Synonyms
- Aechmophorus lucasi Miller, 1911; Aechmophorus occidentalis lucasi Miller, 1911; Aechmophorus occidentalis occidentalis (Lawrence, 1858)

= Western grebe =

Species of bird

The western grebe (Aechmophorus occidentalis) is a species in the grebe family of water birds. Folk names include "dabchick", "swan grebe" and "swan-necked grebe".

Western grebe fossils from the Late Pleistocene of southwest North America were described as a distinct species, but later ranked as a paleosubspecies Aechmophorus occidentalis lucasi. Later studies found them to fall within the variation now known to exist in today's birds.

== Description ==
The western grebe is the largest North American grebe. It is 55–75 cm (22–30 in) long, weighs 795–2,000 g (1.753–4.409 lb) and measures 79–102 cm (31–40 in) across the wings. It is black-and-white, with a long, slender, swan-like neck and red eyes. It is easily confused with Clark's grebe, which shares similar features, body size, behavior and habitat, and hybrids are known. Clark's grebes generally populate more of the southern part of North America Other differences are whiter flanks and paler gray backs when comparing Clark's grebe to the western grebe. The western grebe has black around the eyes and a straight greenish-yellow bill whereas Clark's grebe has white around the eyes and an up-turned bright yellow bill. The downy young of western are grey; Clark's downy young are white.

== Distribution ==
This species of waterbirds is widespread in western North America and there is no specific place of abundance. Western grebes nest in colonies on lakes that are mixed with marsh vegetation and open water. Western grebe nests are made of plant debris and sodden materials, and the nest-building begins roughly around late April through June. The construction is done by both sexes and is continued on throughout laying and incubation.

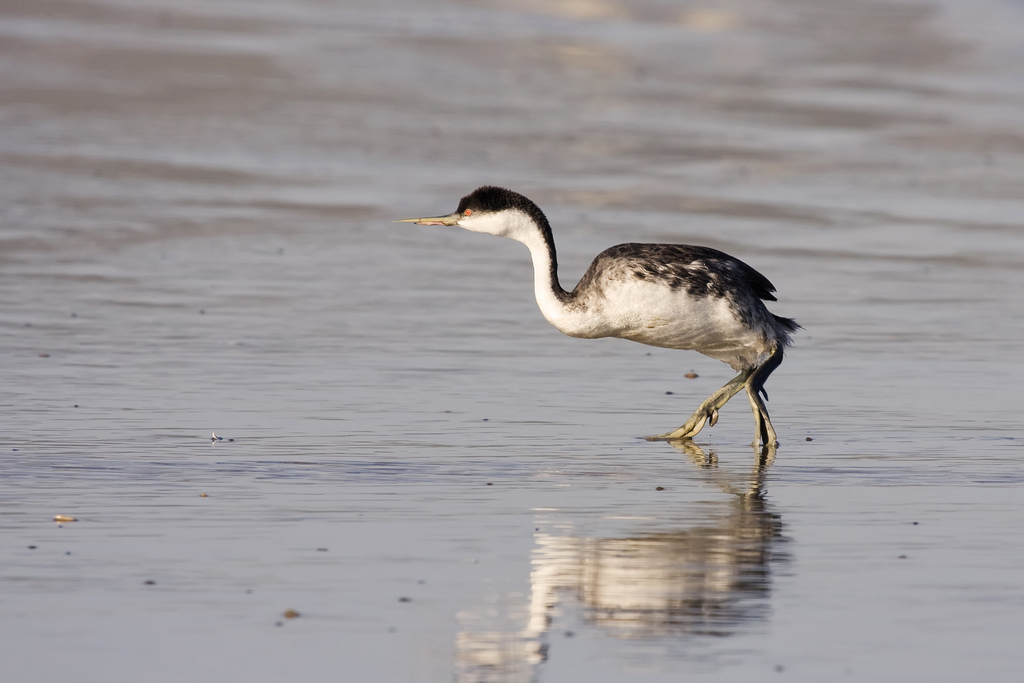
Out of the water

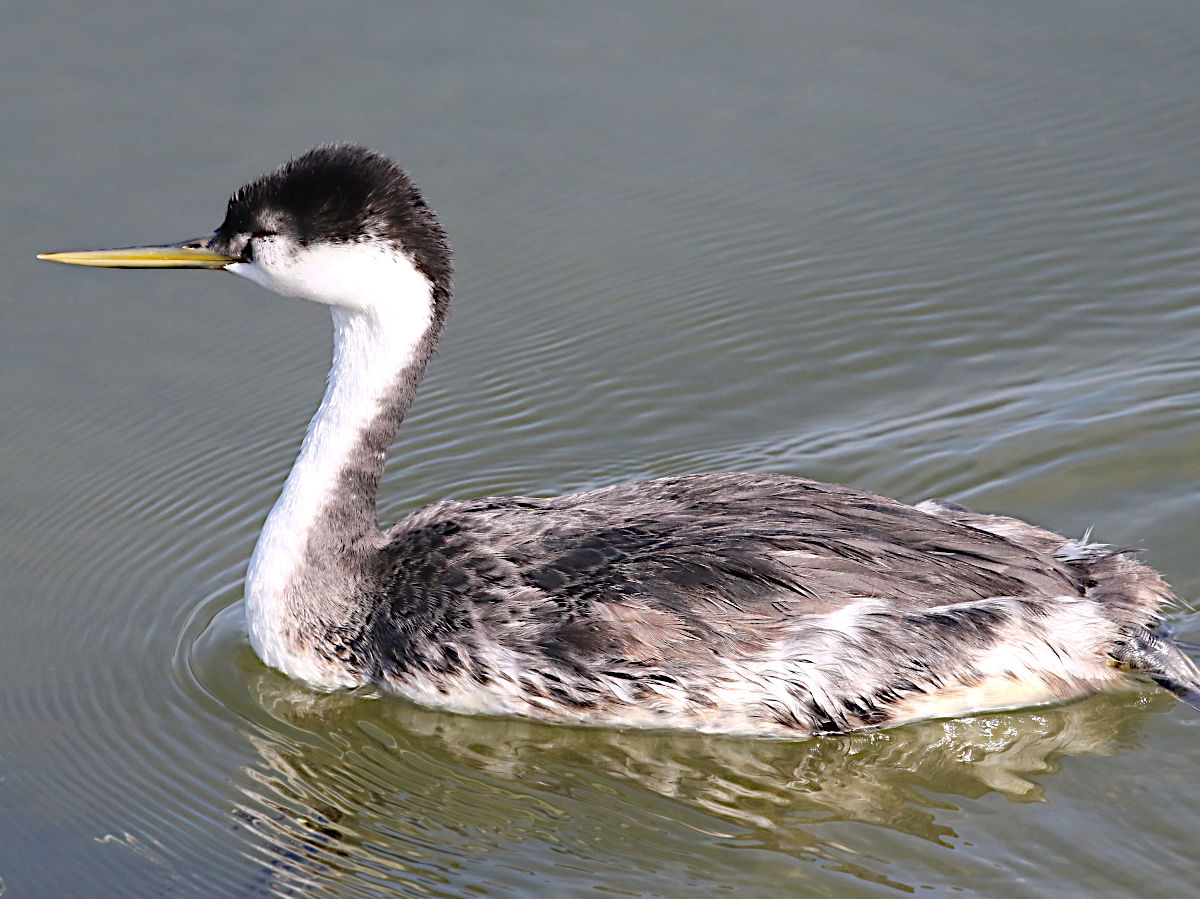
Swimming

=== Subspecies ===
In 1858 George Newbold Lawrence recognised Podiceps occidentalis based on darker coloured specimens, and P. clarkii based on three paler coloured specimens -two from California and one from Chihuahua. These two colour morphs were found to occur, roost and even interbreed together, and were long regarded to be synonyms (although it is unclear why P. clarkii was regarded as the junior synonym, coming alphabetically first). Deignan designated the Mexican specimen as the holotype of the taxon P. clarkii in 1961. In 1963 Dickerman reinstated the taxon as Aechmophorus clarkii, which he defined as the smaller birds, both dark and pale coloured, from Mexico. In 1979 a comprehensive study by Ratti demonstrated the apparent existence of reproductive barriers between different phases of the grebes. In 1986 Dickerman recognised the taxonomic significance of the distinctions between the dark and pale phase, and classified these phases as different subspecies:

- A. occidentalis ssp. occidentalis, (Lawrence, 1858), large, dark morph, from western Canada & United States (California, Utah)
- A. occidentalis ssp. ephemeralis, Dickerman, 1986 - Smaller than the western grebe, dark morph, from north & central Mexico.

Multiple lines of evidence suggest that the differently colored western grebes (darker and lighter) are different taxa -in a single population in which sympatric speciation somehow persists. These forms were reported to mate according to their own colors and the mixing between dark and light-faced individuals is rare. This type of assortative mating derives from possible isolating mechanisms such as differential responses to advertising calls and spatial distribution. Each of the forms tended to stay closer to their own type, thus making their colony nesting be non-randomly distributed.

By 1992 Storer & Nuechterlein were promoting another concept to the taxon A. clarkii, now regarding the pale morphs from the US and Canada to be this taxon (Dickerman's A. occidentalis ssp. ephemeralis).

== Breeding ==
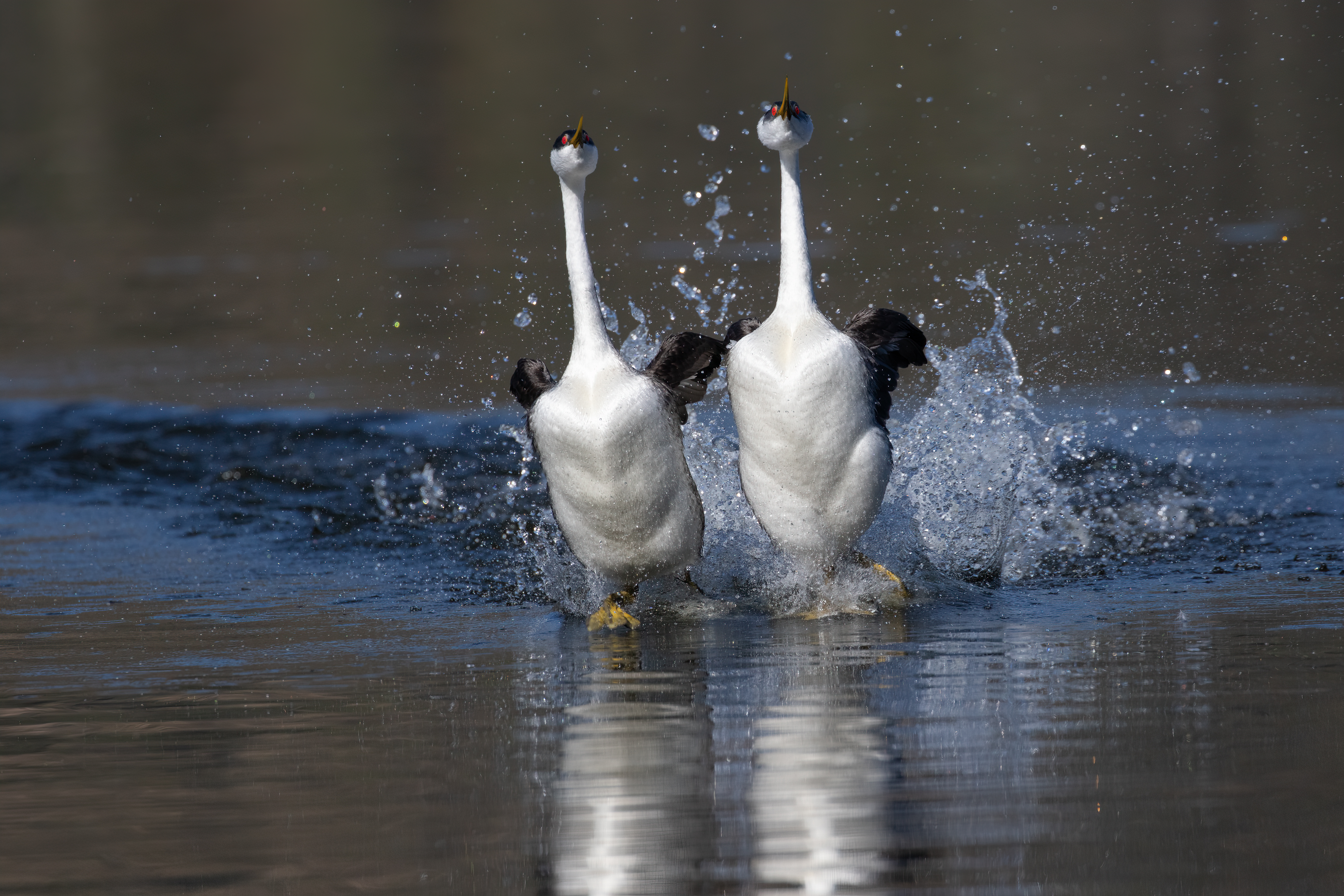
Rushing western grebes in courtship

Western grebes nest in colonies of hundreds on large inland lakes, sometimes using coastal marshes, in western North America. It has a spectacular courtship display; two birds will rear up and patter across the water's surface. Northern birds migrate west to coastal ocean in winter; birds in the southwest and Mexico may be permanent residents. During the breeding season, the birds advertise themselves through ceremonies. Rushing Ceremony, which can be also called as water dance, race or run, is a ceremony that is the most frequent display to form a pair-bond. This is performed in pairs of either both male Western grebes or one male and one female. One of two individuals initiates Rushing, and the paired individual follows immediately and performs in synchrony. The birds lift their wings stiffly to the side and run in an upright position with its head held forward and neck curved. The males seem to perform the rushing together to attract the attention of females, and when one of two males attracts a female from his rushing behavior, a competition arises between males to get the female. One out of two withdraw and the "winning" male mates with the female by performing Rushing together and continue to perform Weed Ceremony. Weed Ceremony usually precedes the acts of mating and nest building. It is done after the pair is formed, and the ceremony begins as the mates bob their heads in water. Then they dive in place and come back up to surface while holding weed on their beaks. This ceremony is continued until one of the pair flips away its weeds and drops to a normal position in water. They continue their mating with Greeting Ceremony. Greeting ceremony is similar to the form of rushing ceremony and involves dip-shaking, bob-shaking, bob-preening and arch-clucking. Dip-shaking consists of dipping the head in the water and raising it up while rapidly waggling the bill side to side. This involves a low neck posture and conspicuous water splash while bob-shaking does not. These breeding dances are known to be the most elaborated dances in the waterbird species. After the breeding, the male Western Grebes feed their mate, thus performing mate feeding behavior. The feeding resembles the feeding of the young by parents, and through the feeding they obtain, females are able to have enough energy to form their eggs. During the incubation period, male and female Western Grebes trade places to incubate their eggs for weeks, and those that are not incubating feed their mate.

== Communication style ==
When tending their young, Western grebe parents use different types of vocalization to communicate. Ticking is one of the two and is used as an alarm signal. Parents carry their newly hatched young on their backs, and when the parents make a ticking sound, this is used as a signal for their chicks to hide their heads beneath the back of their parents and be silent. If chicks are greater than 4 weeks of age, they respond to the ticking by swimming or diving away on their own. When making a ticking sound, the callers do not open their mouths, so it is hard to distinguish who is the maker of the sound. The parent who carries the chicks tend to make the ticking sound more often than those that do not, and both of male and female parents are equally likely to tick. Another vocalization noise is clucking, and this signals for food. When a parent clucks, the young respond to it by poking their head out of their parent back where they are on to receive food.

== Reproduction and survival ==
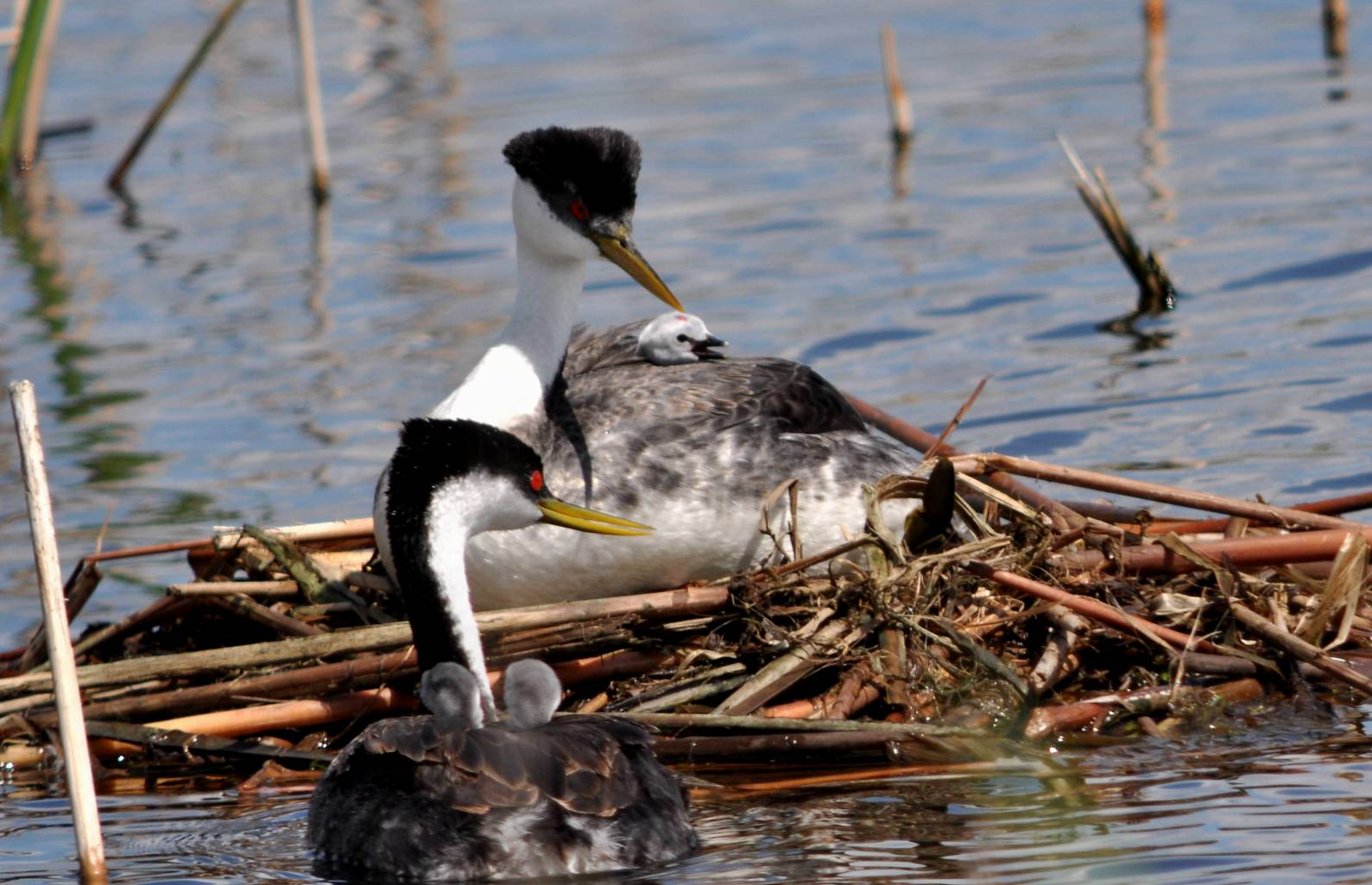
Western grebes nesting with young

The clutch size decreases as the mating season progresses, meaning if the mating is done at the last of days in mating season, the number of offspring produced is smaller. However it is also stated brood size of nests that hatched later in the season is larger than those from earlier, which contradicts previous findings. This may be due to ecological constraints. Ecological constraints also pressure the young, and this may lead to siblicide in the first weeks after hatching, which may explain the brooding differences. Also, Western grebes are sensitive to humans, such that when there is human disturbance near them, the parents leave their nest, leaving their unhatched eggs vulnerable to attacks by predators. This shows the predation or even the seemingly threatening acts result in a decrease of reproduction and survival of the young. Because they are so sensitive, there have been restoration efforts to rebuild the Western grebes' native habitats, so that they have greater opportunity to reproduce and raise their young without disturbance or threat. The number of Grebes has been slowly declining in the last two decades, not only because of predation, but also because of habitat destruction, with oil spillage being one of the major causes.

== Food and feeding ==
This bird dives for carp, herring, mollusks, crabs, and amphibians, such as salamanders. It often peers below the water before diving. Recent observations suggest that the grebe dives at the bottom of the lake. Some smaller fish are impaled much like herons, with the bill, but others are grasped. Most are swallowed underwater, but some are brought to the surface, pinched, and swallowed.
