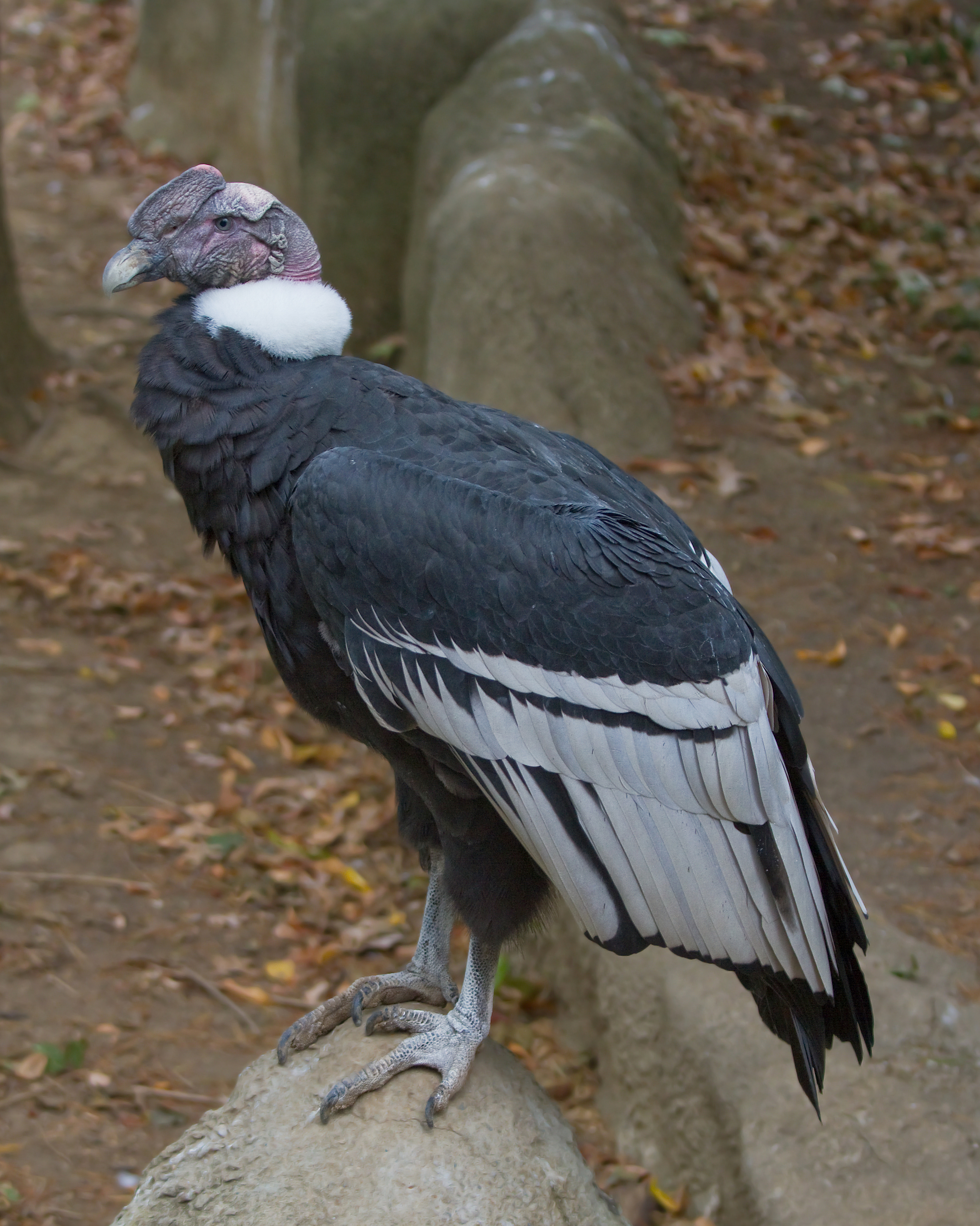
- Andean condor
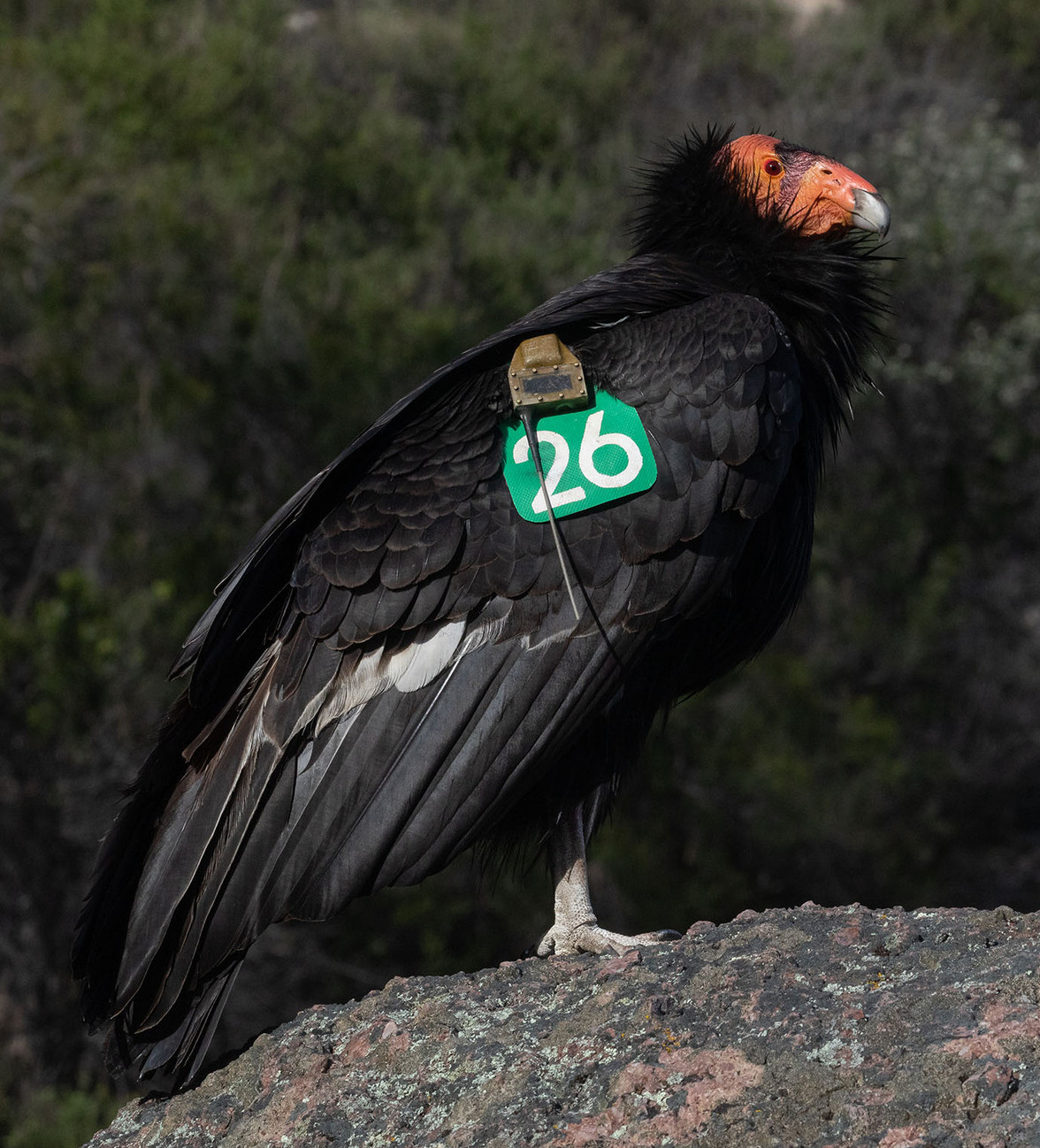
- California condor

Scientific classification
- Kingdom: Animalia
- Phylum: Chordata
- Class: Aves
- Order: Cathartiformes
- Family: Cathartidae

Genera
- Vultur; Gymnogyps

= Condor =

Condor Temporal range: Late Pliocene – Holocene

Name for two species of vultures

Condor is the common name for two genera of New World vultures, each with one extant species. The name derives from the Quechua word for the Andean condor, kuntur. They are the largest flying land birds in the Western Hemisphere.

One species, the Andean condor (Vultur gryphus), inhabits the Andean mountains. The other, the California condor (Gymnogyps californianus), is currently restricted to the western coastal mountains of the contiguous United States and Mexico, as well as the northern desert mountains of Arizona.

== Taxonomy ==
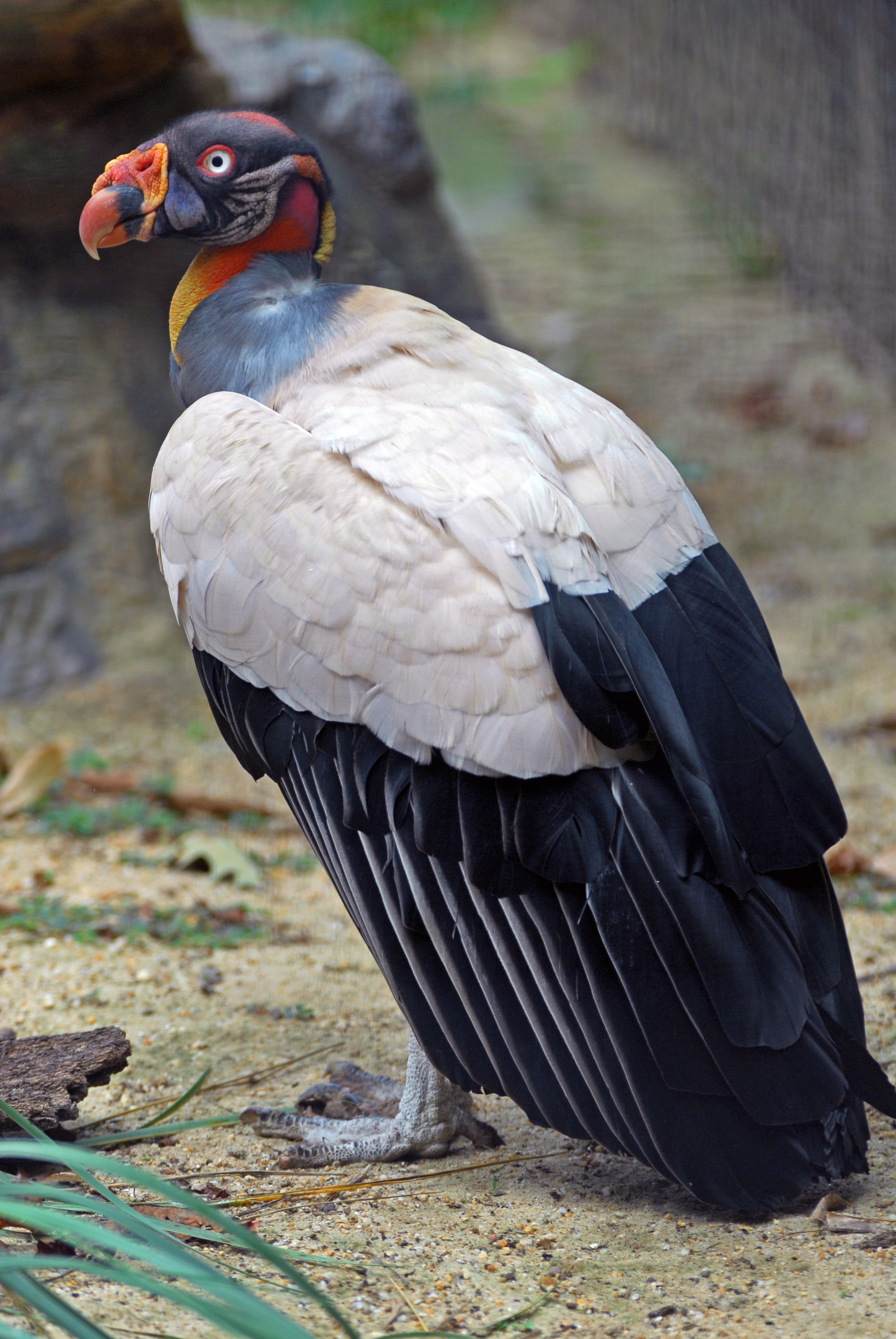
The king vulture has close affinities with condors

Condors are part of the family Cathartidae, which contains the New World vultures, whereas the 15 species of Old World vultures are in the family Accipitridae, which also includes hawks, eagles, and kites. The New World and Old World vultures evolved from different ancestors. They both are carrion-eaters and the two groups are similar in appearance due to convergent evolution.

The term "condor" reflects a paraphyletic group, as the king vulture, which is not typically referred to as a condor, is nested within the clade that includes Andean and California condors, although it is unclear which of them it is more closely related to.

== Description ==
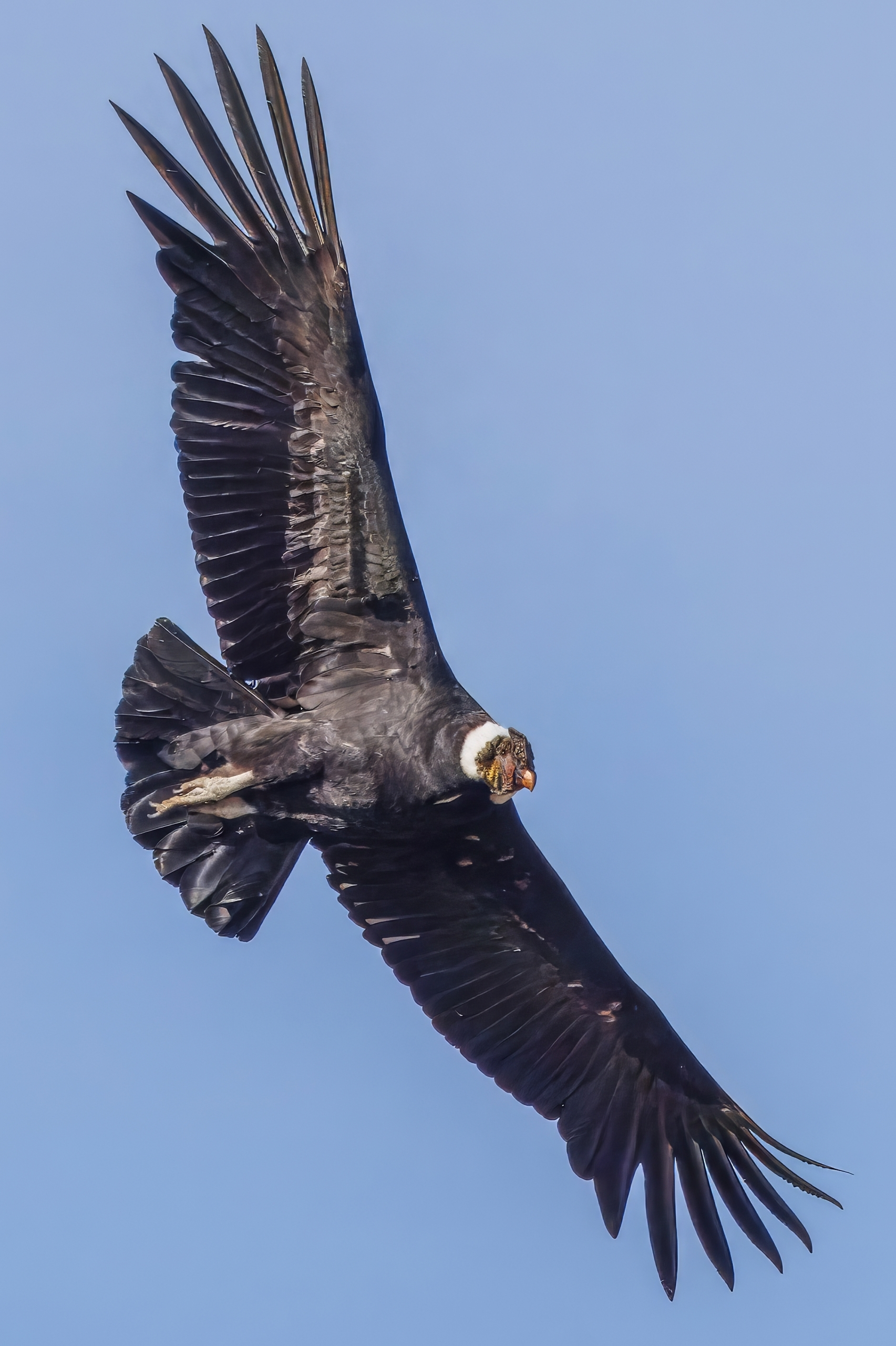
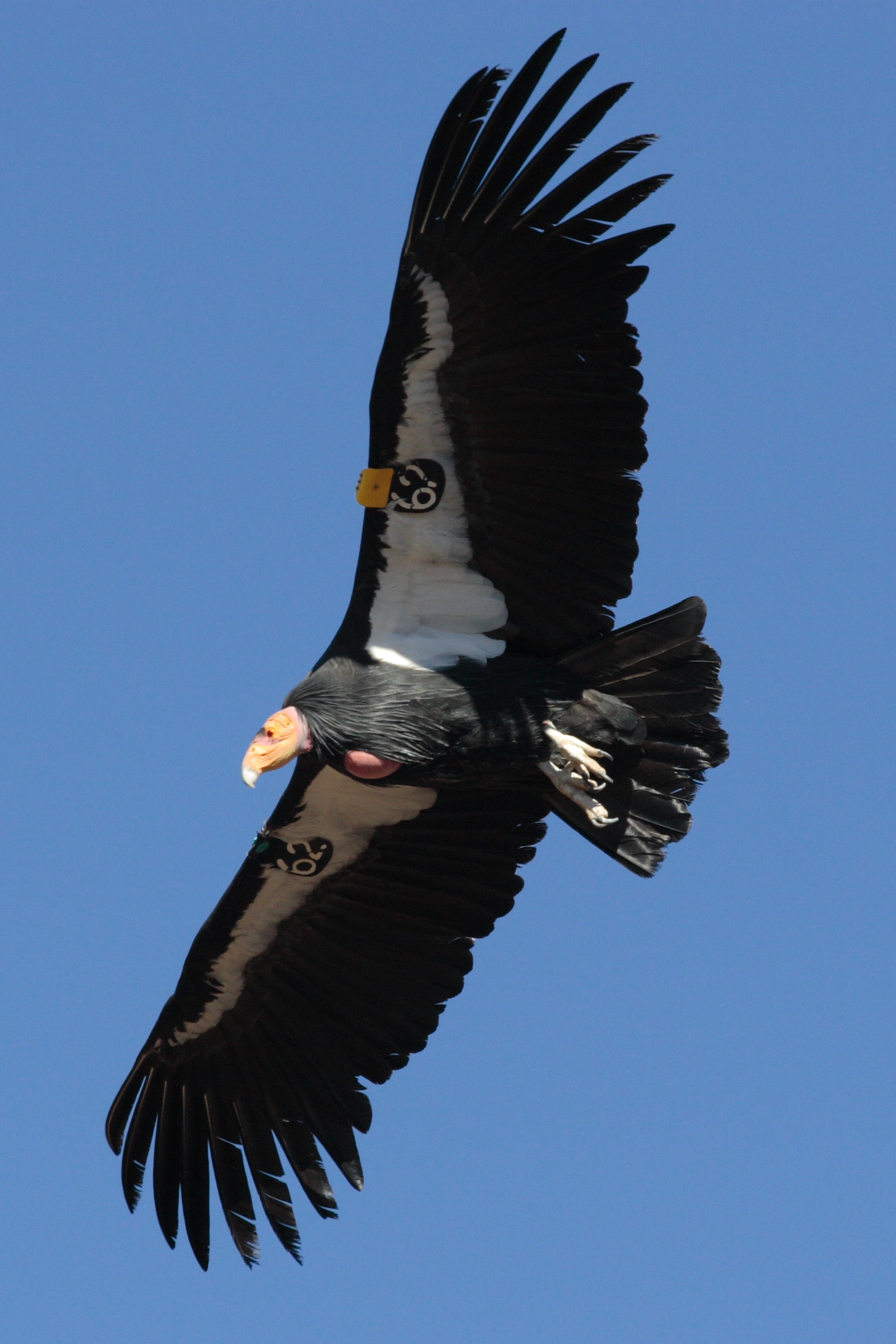
Andean condor (left) and California condor (right)

Condors are very large, broad-winged soaring birds, the Andean condor being 3–6 inches (7.6–15.2 centimetres) shorter (beak to tail) on average than the northern species, but heavier and larger in wingspan. The Andean condor has a wingspan of 2.7–3.1 metres (8 feet 10 1/2 inches – 10 feet 2 inches) and even up to about 3.20 metres (10 ft 6 in) and a weight of 8–15 kg, with males ranging from 11 to 15 kg (24 to 33 lb) and females 7.5 to 11 kg (17 to 24 lb). Meanwhile the California condor has a weight of 8–14 kg and wingspan of about 109 inches, or 2.77 meters. California condors are North America's largest flying land birds. Among all living flying birds, the Andean condor is the third heaviest after the Kori bustard and great bustard (up to 21 kg or 46 lb), and second only to the wandering albatross (up to 3.5 m or 11 ft 6 in) in wingspan. Measurements are usually taken from specimens reared in captivity.

The adult plumage is uniformly black, except for a frill of white feathers nearly surrounding the base of the neck, which are meticulously kept clean by the bird. As an adaptation for hygiene, the condor's head and neck have few feathers, which exposes the skin to the sterilizing effects of dehydration and solar ultraviolet light at high altitudes. The head is much flattened above. In the male, it is crowned with a caruncle or comb, while the skin of the neck lies in folds, forming a wattle. The head and neck skin can flush noticeably in response to the emotional state and transmitted between individuals. In Andean condors, specifically males, there is typically extra skin below their beak, much like that of a turkey. Alternatively, Andean condors often have a white feather collar at the base of their head. Most California condors are without an extra plumage and display a longer neck than that of the Andean.

The middle toe is greatly elongated, the hind one is slightly developed, and the nails of all the toes are comparatively straight and blunt. The feet are thus more adapted to walking (similar to the closely-related storks) and are of little use as weapons or organs of prehension (as in birds of prey and Old World vultures). Contrary to the usual rule among birds of prey, the female is smaller than the male.

California condors' skin on the neck varies in color, depending on the age of the birds. During the breeding season, adult birds' skin color can be cream, pink, yellow, or orange. Most commonly, Andean tend to utilize white or black skin tones, while the California condor leans towards pink.

== Fossil record ==
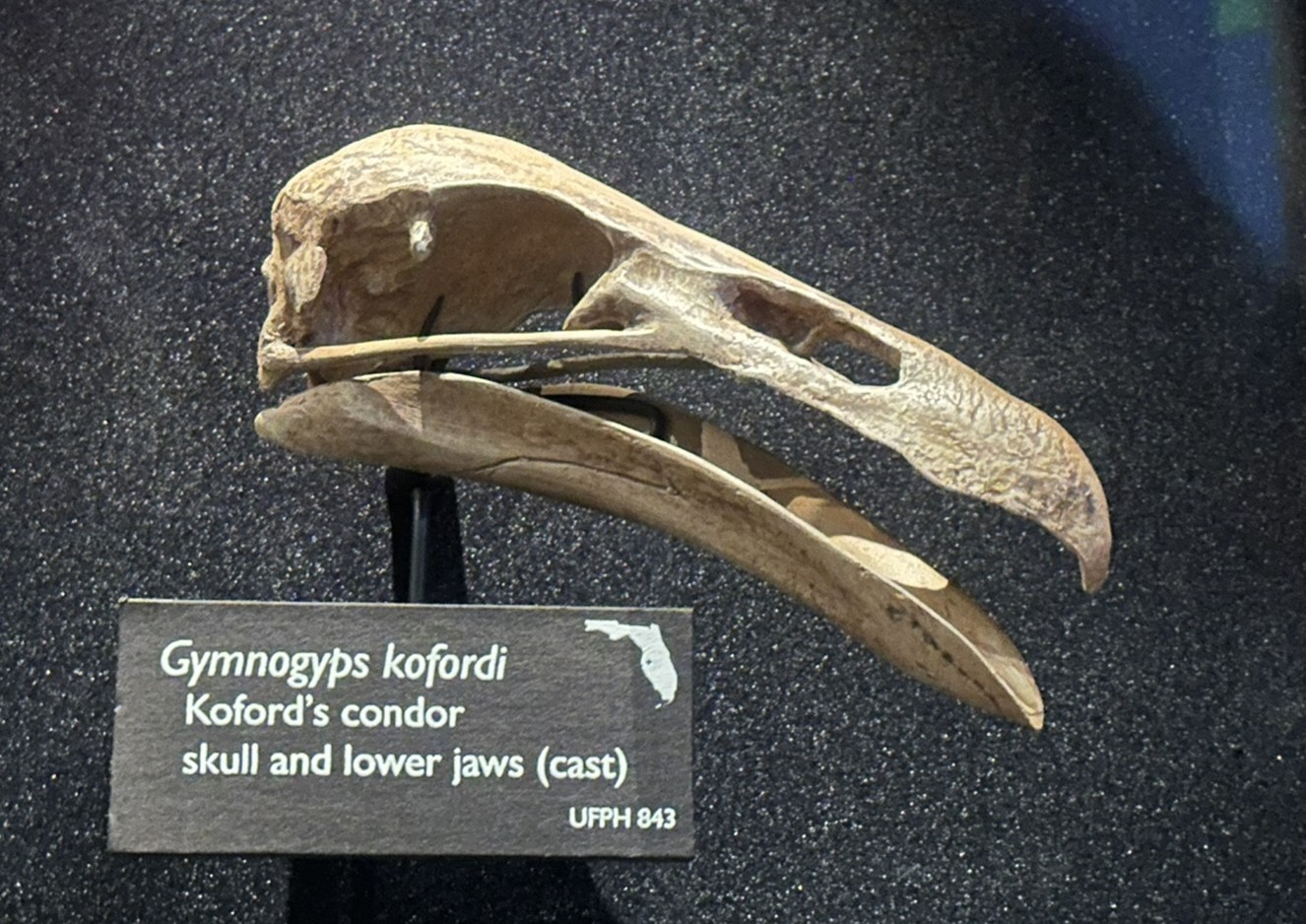
†Gymnogyps kofordi fossil skull cast, a species from Pleistocene Florida

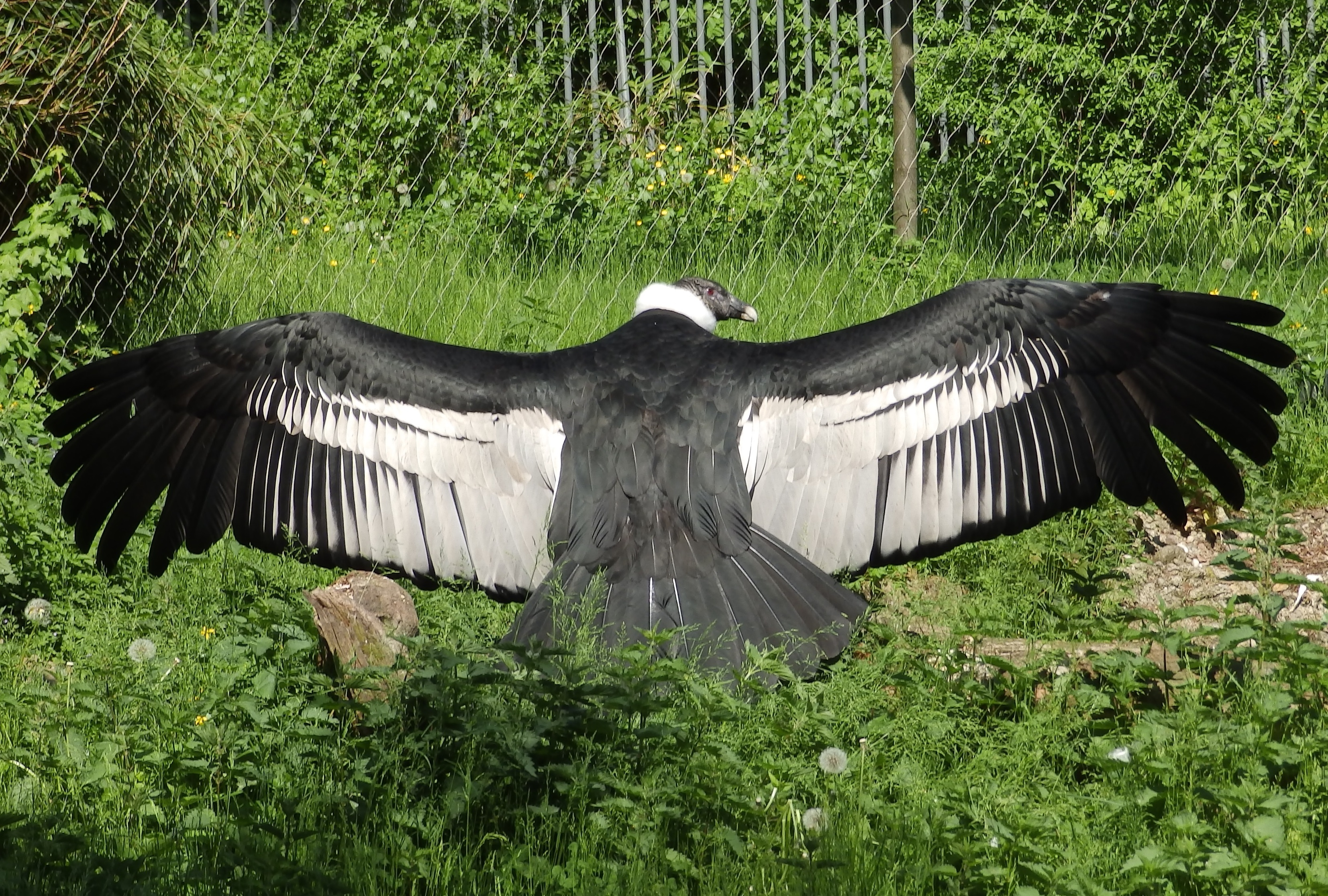
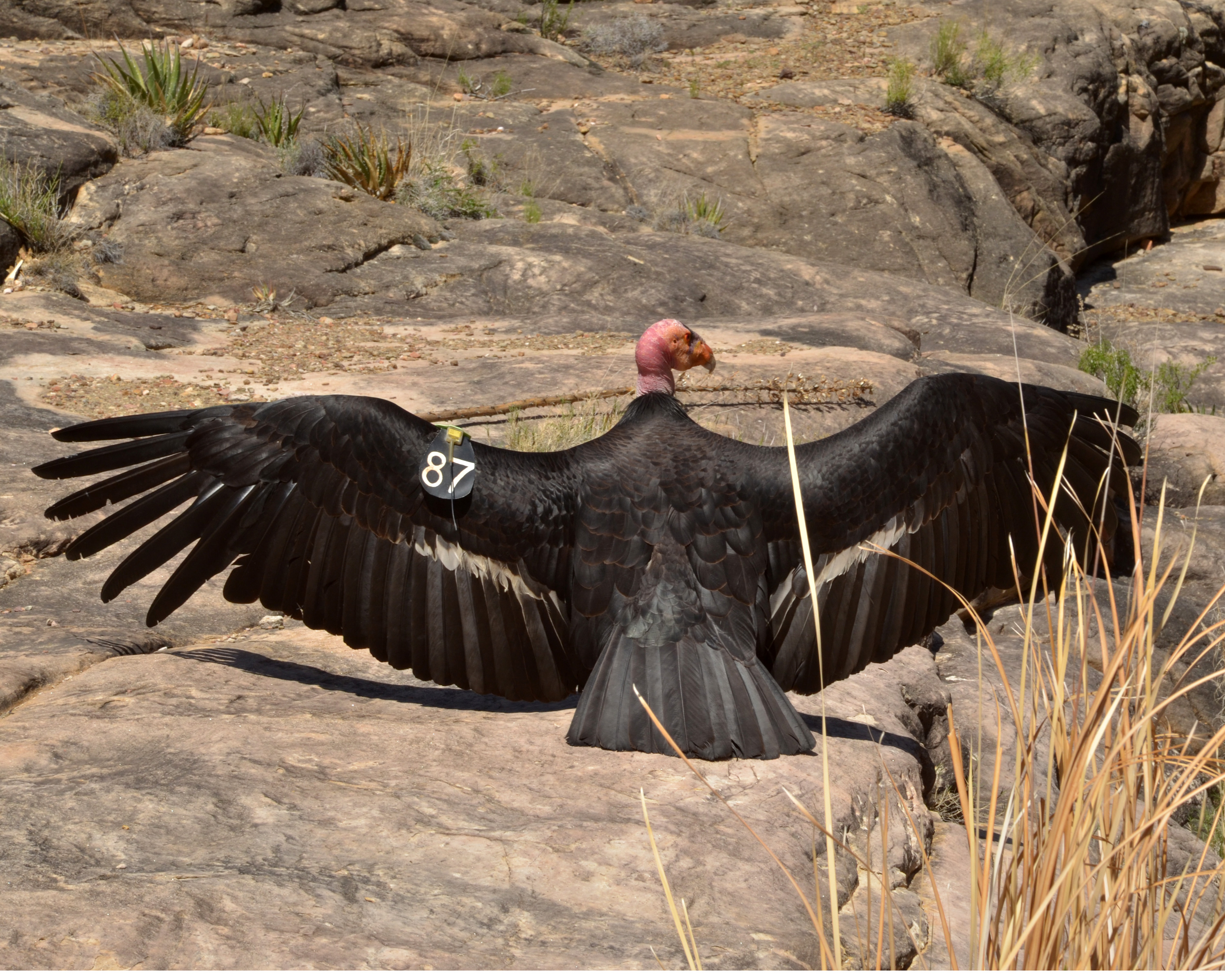
Andean condor (top), California condor (bottom)

Pleistocene fossils of both extinct and extant condor species have been discovered across North America, from New York to Florida. These findings indicate that California condors and their relatives had a much broader historical range than their current distribution, extending from the western coastline to the eastern seaboard before local extinctions reduced their territory.

== Behavior ==
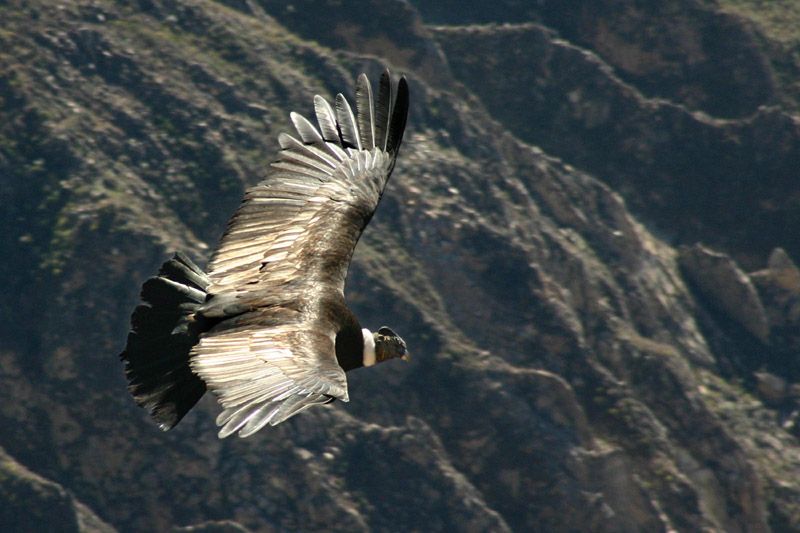
Andean condor soaring over southern Peru's Colca Canyon

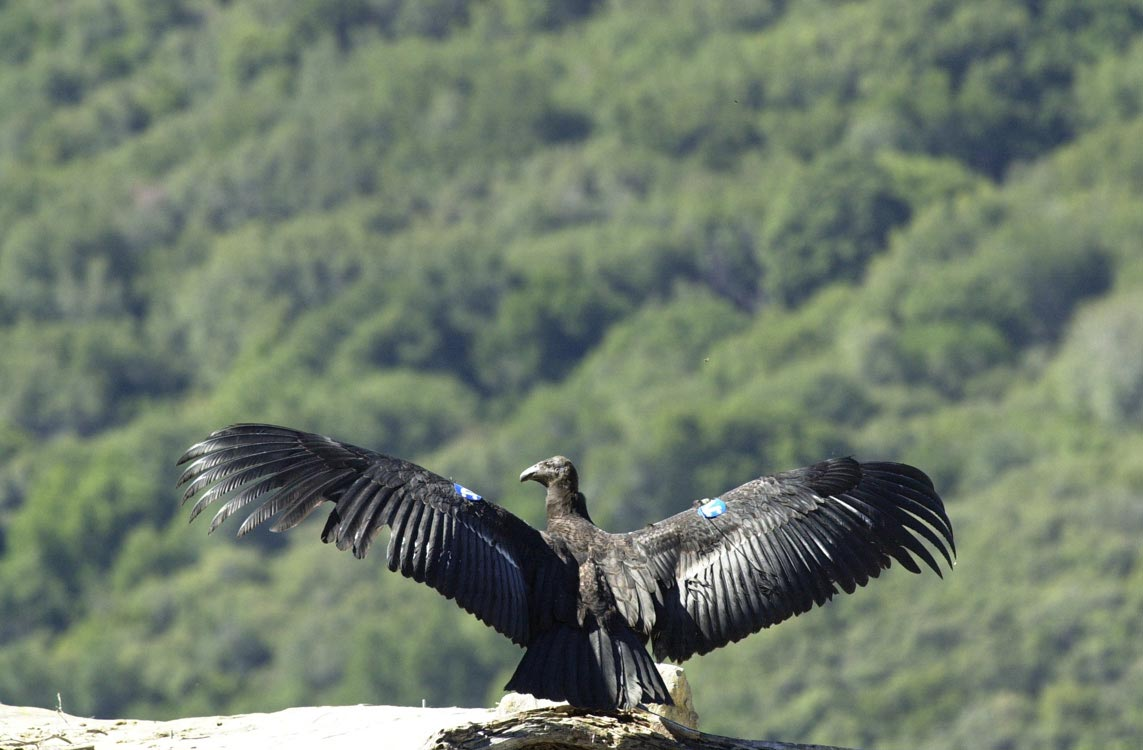
Immature California condor

Sexual maturity and breeding behavior do not appear in the condor until 5 or 6 years of age. Condors are monogamous creatures and will mate for life. They may live for 50 years or more and the world's oldest condor died at 100 in the Botanical Garden Hamma in Algiers. Condors nest with one chick at a time, laying one egg every year to year and a half. Due to their size, condors require lots of care and nutrition very early on in their chick stage.

These birds tend to be more social than other birds of prey. They often clump in smaller groups and socialize and rest together. They will often revisit the same locations for daily activities and seasonal roosts.

The young are covered with a grayish down until they are almost as large as their parents. They can fly after six months but continue to roost and hunt with their parents until age two, when they are displaced by a new clutch. There is a well-developed social structure within large groups of condors; a recent study showed the 'pecking order' is determined by age group and, within age groups, by sex (which contradicts previous findings).

The lack of a large sternum to anchor correspondingly large flight muscles identifies it physiologically as a primary soarer. The birds flap their wings on rising from the ground, but after attaining a moderate elevation, they seem to sail on the air, transiting from one upstream to the next, often without flapping their wings. One Andean condor was recorded maintaining such flight for 171 kilometers (106 mi), for over five hours. Because of their size, these birds tend to rely on strong thermal currents to propel them higher into wind currents.

Wild condors inhabit large territories, often traveling 250 km (160 mi) a day in search of carrion. With such a large wingspan these birds can sometimes get by with one single wing flap over an hour. They prefer large carcasses, such as deer or cattle, which they spot by looking for other scavengers. However, these rival species cannot rip through the tougher hides of these larger animals with the efficiency of a larger condor. In the wild, they are intermittent eaters, often going for a few days without eating, then gorging themselves on several kilograms (pounds) at once.

== Habitat ==
Each condor inhabits a very different set of locations. The Andean condor naturally resides in South America, particularly the Western coast. They range along the entirety of the coast, but tend to live towards the Andes and Patagonia mountain chains. California condors occupy a different global location. As the name implies, these condors tend to live in California and the Southwest United States. Occasionally, the California condor will take up residence in Northwest Mexico. Both species tend to prefer high altitudes, roughly 16,000 feet, for habitat creation. Most commonly these species will reside on the caves or cliffsides of mountains at this altitude range. Occasionally, California condors will also nest in large redwood tree cavities. Condors instinctively choose locations that naturally protect their young from predators, like golden eagles, given the elevation and isolation.

== Threats ==
Both species of condor have significant threats facing their livelihood. The IUCN defines the Andean condor as a vulnerable species, while the California condor is considered critically endangered despite recovery programs. Human threats are currently the most dire to both species. Andean condors tend to be purposefully shot or poisoned because of prejudice or assumed connections between condors and eating cattle. Another threat to Andean condors is local belief in medicinal properties in the bones and organs of the birds, leading to hunting. Human threats are more indirect to California condors: human use of lead in bullets and other items has resulted in lead becoming an unintentional part of the condor diet, leading to a dramatic drop in their population over the years. Currently, California has instated a breeding program to aid in recovery, and all the current wild condors are from a subset of twenty-two bred in captivity. Such efforts have led to a dramatic increase in the birds' number. In South America similar programs have begun for the Andean condor but they haven't been fully implemented.

Condor feathers are used to make souvenir products for sale to tourists, but their sale is illegal under Peruvian law.

== Other ==
The Moche people of ancient Peru worshiped nature. They emphasized animals and often depicted condors in their art. In Andean mythology, the Andean condor was representative of a sun deity, and often was perceived as ruling part of the higher world. Even now the bird continues to be considered a symbol of power and health.

Brazilian Carlos Gomes composed the opera Condor premiered in 1863 at Teatro alla Scala in Milan.

== Gallery ==
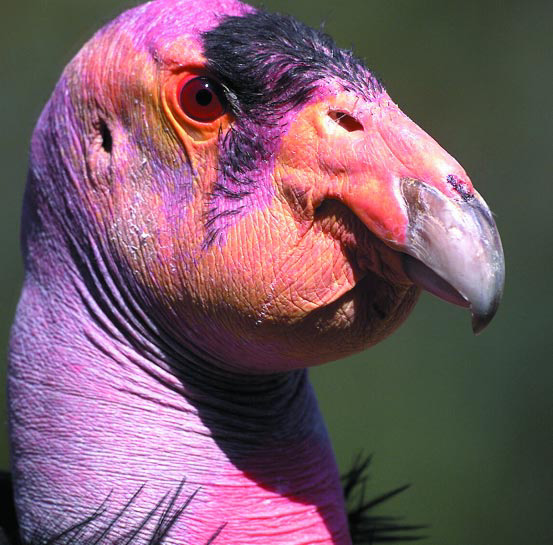
California condor's head

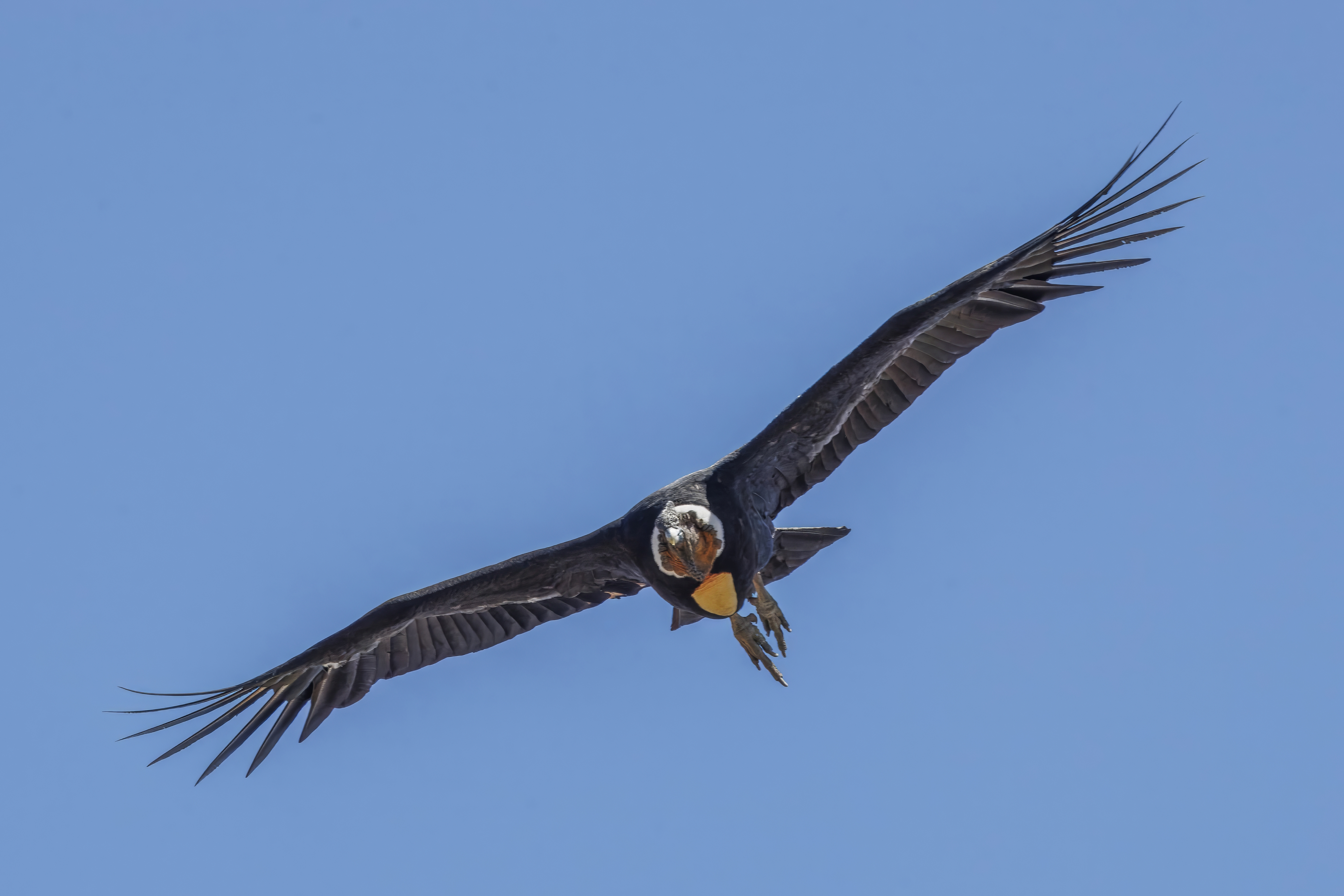
in flight in Clile

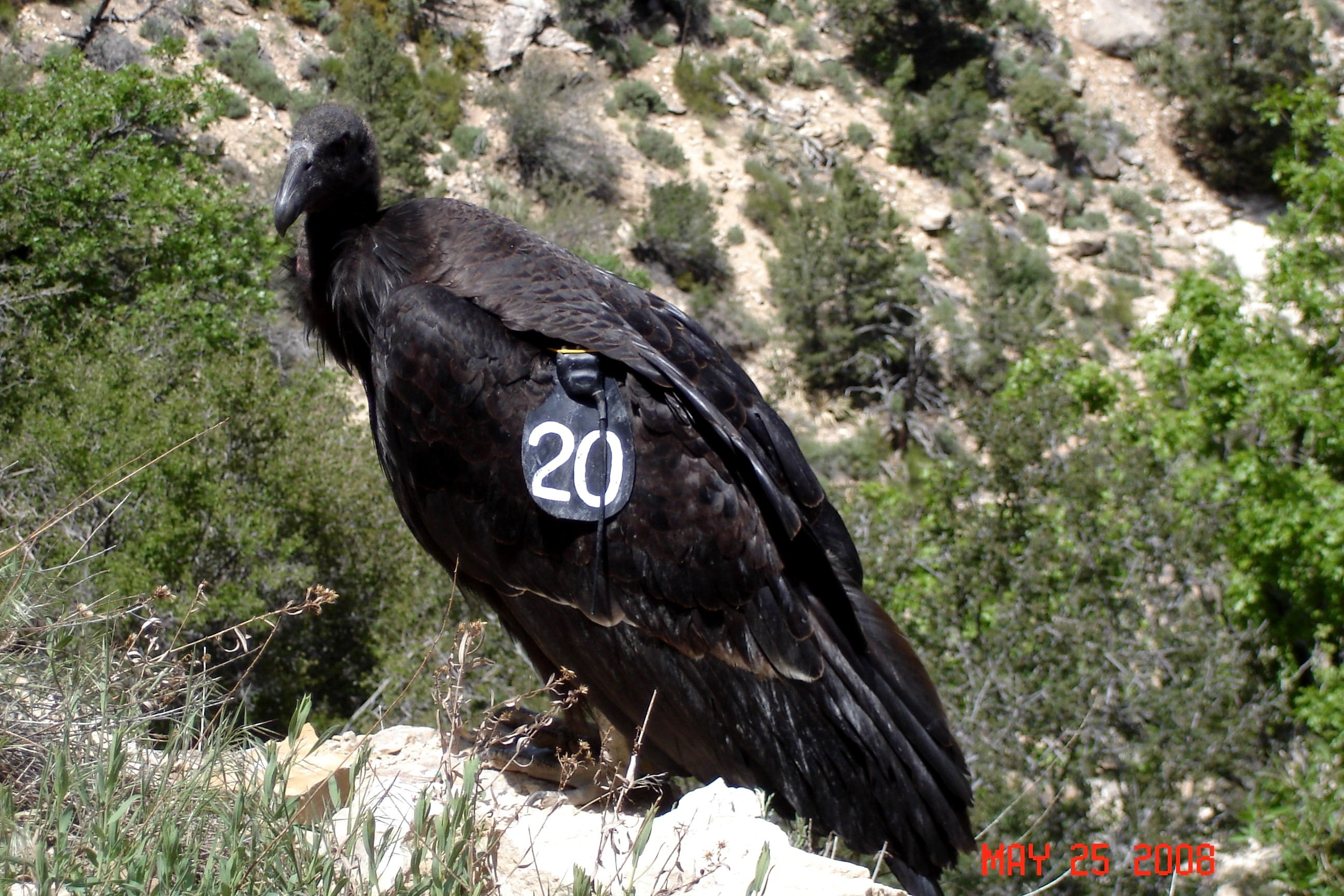
Numbered condor in Grand Canyon, Arizona

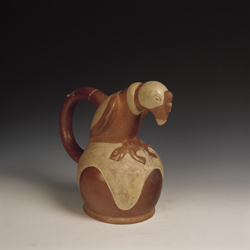
Moche condor. 300 AD. Larco Museum Collection Lima, Peru.
