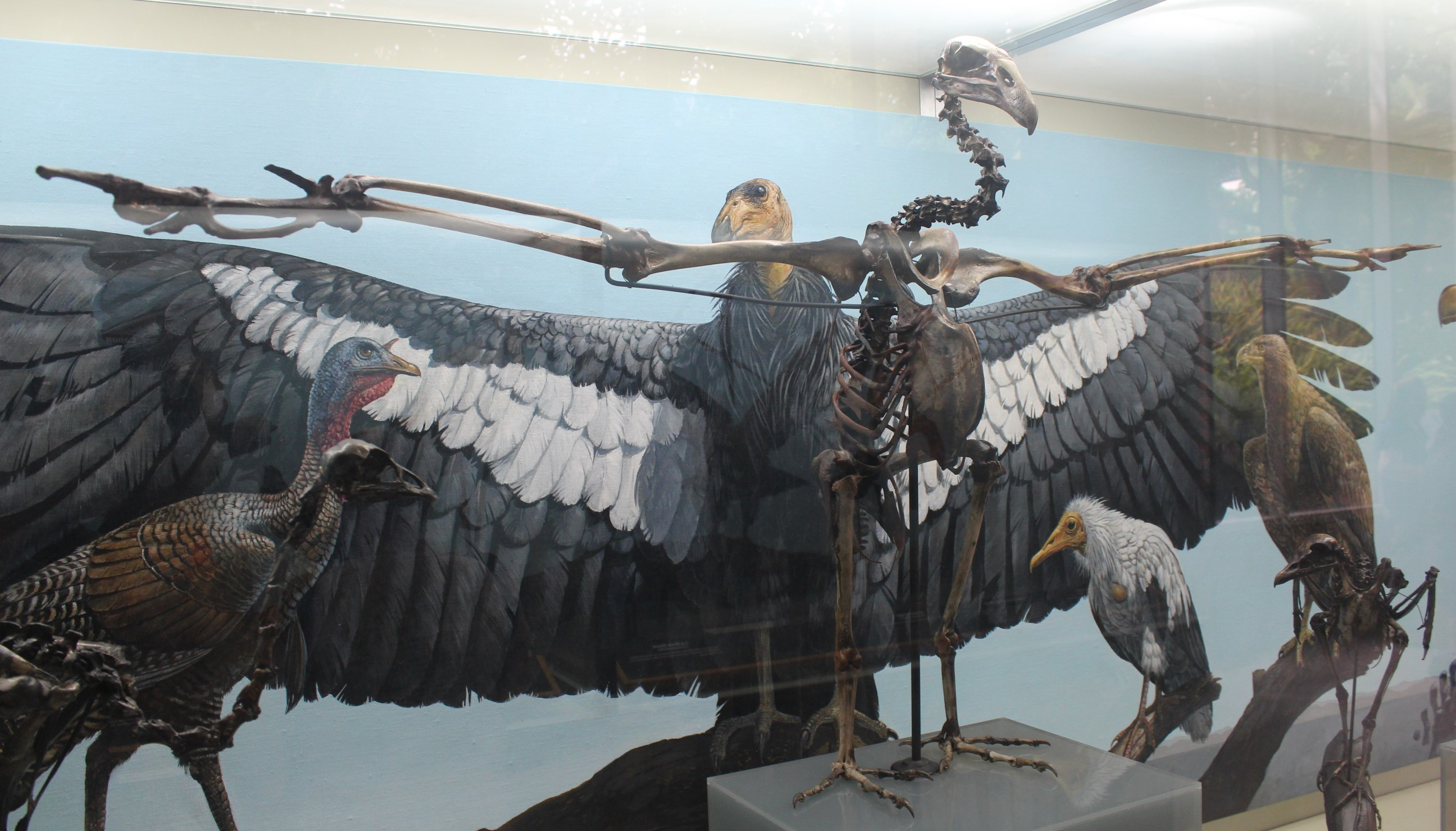
- Fossil skeleton from the La Brea Tar Pits

Scientific classification
- Kingdom: Animalia
- Phylum: Chordata
- Class: Aves
- Order: Accipitriformes
- Family: Cathartidae
- Genus: Gymnogyps
- Species: †G. amplus

Binomial name
- †Gymnogyps amplus L. H. Miller, 1911

= Gymnogyps amplus =

Gymnogyps amplus Temporal range: Late Pleistocene – Holocene

Species of extinct bird

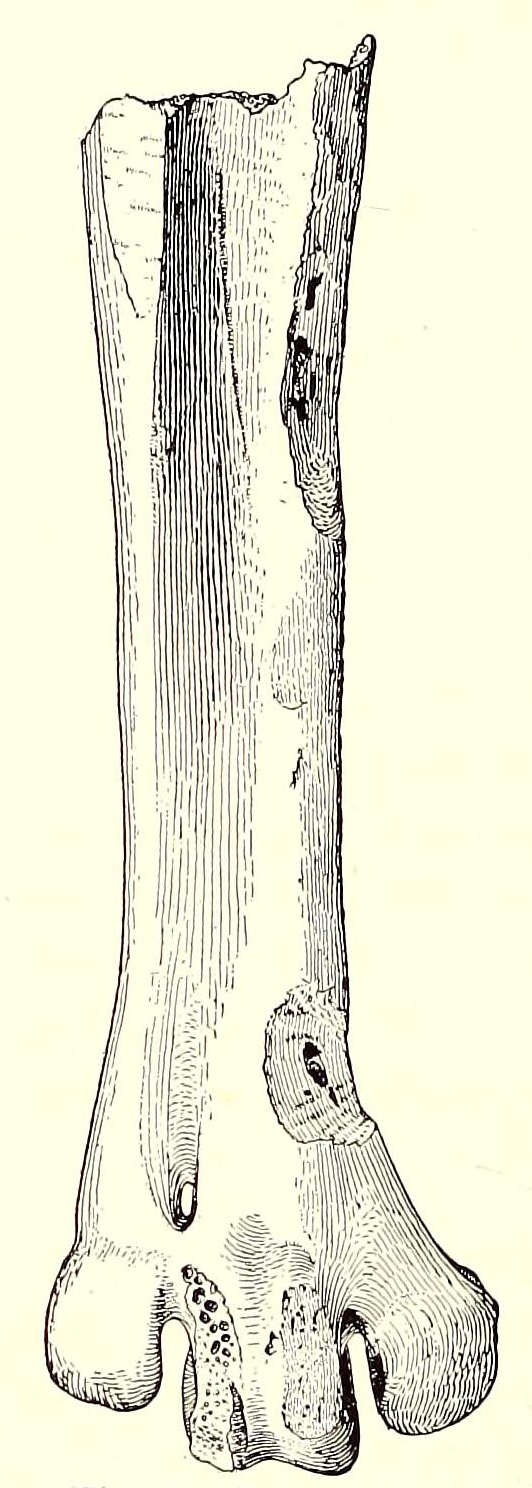
Holotype Tarsometatarsus; Samwel Cave, Shasta County, California

Gymnogyps amplus is an extinct species of large New World vulture belonging to the family Cathartidae. It was first described by Loye H. Miller in 1911 from a partial tarsometatarsus recovered in Pleistocene cave deposits at Samwel Cave in northern California. Additional material was later attributed to the species by Harvey I. Fisher, who in 1944 designated a series of plesiotypes from Rancho La Brea deposits, including a cranium, rostrum, and mandible.

G. amplus is the only condor species recovered from Pit 10 of the La Brea Tar Pits, which fossils have been radiocarbon dated to the early Holocene, approximately 9,000 years ago. The smaller modern California condor (Gymnogyps californianus) has been proposed as a possible descendant of G. amplus.
