= Gymnogyps varonai =

Gymnogyps varonai Temporal range: Quaternary

Scientific classification
- Kingdom: Animalia
- Phylum: Chordata
- Class: Aves
- Order: Cathartiformes
- Family: Cathartidae
- Genus: Gymnogyps
- Species: †G. varonai

Binomial name
- †Gymnogyps varonai (Arredondo, 1971)

Synonyms
- Antillovultur varonai Arredondo, 1971

Extinct species of bird

Gymnogyps varonai, sometimes called the Cuban condor, is an extinct species of large New World vulture in the family Cathartidae. G. varonai is related to the living California condor, G. californianus and the extinct G. kofordi, either one of which it may have evolved from. The species is solely known from fossils found in the late Pleistocene to early Holocene tar seep deposits in Cuba. G. varonai may have preyed upon carcasses from large mammals such as ground sloths.

== History and classification ==
The species is known from at least six fragmentary fossils housed in the Museo Nacional de Historia Natural in Havana, Cuba, and includes a premaxilla, coracoid, the basal end of a right radius. The specimens were collected from the Las Breas de San Felipe tar seep site San Filipe II, which is located 5.5 kilometres (3.4 mi) west of Martí, Cuba. Based on the geology of the sites, the seeps are suggested to date from the Quaternary, being younger than the weathered serpentinites found under the seeps, and older than the 0.2 metres (0.66 ft) of undisturbed topsoil which covers the deposits. A Pleistocene age has been given to both the mollusk fauna, studied in 1935 and the seed flora, studied in 1940. The fossils were first studied by the Cuban Quaternary paleontologist Oscar Arredondo who described the species and placed it into a new genus Antillovultur as Antillovultur varonai. The erection of the genus was subsequently questioned by other paleontologists, with Storrs L. Olson in 1978 suggesting it should was possibly a member of the genus Gymnogyps. The fossils were fully redescribed in 2003 by William Suárez and Steven Emslie, who concluded that the species belonged to Gymnogyps and synonymized Antillovultur into the genus, resulting in the species being named Gymnogyps varonai.

== Description ==
Overall, the G. varonai fossils show a robust build and an overall larger size compared to the California condor and G. kofordi. The skull MPSG21 has a width of 43.2 millimetres (1.70 in) and a height of 38.8 millimetres (1.53 in) and the femur being approximately 141 millimetres (5.6 in) long. The structure of the skull shows increases in the areas of muscle attachment and suggests larger vertebral dimensions. The bill is more robust than in other species of the genus and the placement of the nuchal crest is further forward. These increases are suggested to be a result of the composition of the diet G. varonai would have eaten. The large animal fauna of Cuba was mainly composed of several ground sloth genera, such as Megalocnus, Acratocnus, and Parocnus, along with large tortoises and rodents. The thicker hides and shells of the carcasses are suggested to have selected for more robust and powerful carrion feeders.
