= Las Breas de San Felipe, Cuba =

Tar pit in Cuba with important bird and mammal fossils

Las Breas de San Felipe is a tar pit located in Matanzas Province, Cuba. It is an important paleontological site, with fossils from the Quaternary Period. It has been an especially rich source of bird fossils, many of which are unique to the site.

== Geography ==
The tar pit site is located 5.5 kilometers northwest of the town of Martí in the Matanzas Province of Cuba.

== Flora and Fauna ==
=== Plants ===
Plant remains are mostly from extant Caribbean native plants, including Chrysobalanus icaco, Pinus caribaea and Spondias lutea.

=== Birds ===
The bird assemblage at San Felipe includes extant predatory birds like Caracara and Accipiter, and the Cuban crow (one of the few Cuban sites where fossils of this crow type were found). Extinct species include the condor Gymnogyps varonai, a flightless crane Antigone cubensis and the giant endemic hawk Buteogallus borrasi.

A 2003 study led to the discovery of three types of storks: the M. americana (first fossil record ever), the M. Wetmorei (first found outside of California and Florida), and an unidentified Ciconia-like species.

In 2020, several new fossil bird species were described from the site, including a vulture Coragyps seductus, a species of Buteo hawk, and the eagle Gigantohierax itchei. This study brought the total of fossil bird species registered to 36.

=== Mammals ===
Fossils from San Felipe provide evidence for one species of giant sloth, Parocnus brownii surviving well into the Holocene. The fossils have been dated to less than 5,000 years old. This is slightly younger than the most recent human cultural remains in Cuba, suggesting that giant sloths may have been present when humans arrived on the island.
