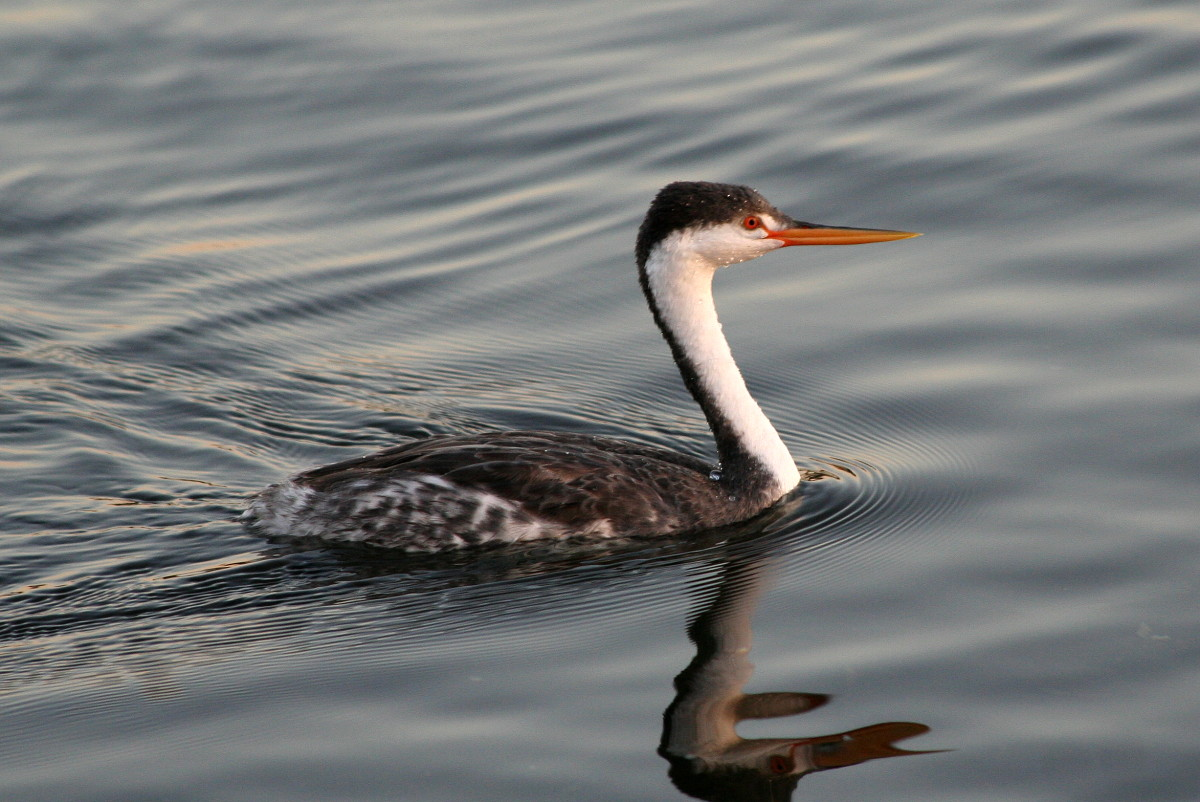
- Nonbreeding plumage

Conservation status
- Least Concern (IUCN 3.1)

Scientific classification
- Kingdom: Animalia
- Phylum: Chordata
- Class: Aves
- Order: Podicipediformes
- Family: Podicipedidae
- Genus: Aechmophorus
- Species: A. clarkii

Binomial name
- Aechmophorus clarkii (Lawrence, 1858)
- Approximate distribution map Breeding Year-round Nonbreeding

= Clark's grebe =

Species of bird

Clark's grebe (Aechmophorus clarkii) is a North American waterbird species in the grebe family. Until the 1980s, it was thought to be a pale morph of the western grebe, which it resembles in size, range, and behavior. Intermediates between the two species are known.

This species nests on large inland lakes in western North America and migrates to the Pacific coast over the winter. It maintains local populations year-round in California, Nevada, and Arizona (the Lower Colorado River Valley), as well as in central Mexico. It feeds by diving for insects, polychaete worms, crustaceans, and salamanders.

It performs the same elaborate courtship display as the western grebe.

== Etymology and common names ==
The "Clark" of its common name—and its specific epithet clarkii—honors John Henry Clark, a 19th-century American surveyor who was also a naturalist and collector. The genus name Aechmophorus comes from the Ancient Greek words αἰχμά (transliterated "aichme"), meaning 'point of a spear', and φόρος ("phoros"), meaning 'bearing'; together translating as 'spear point bearer' and referring to the bird's long, dagger-like beak.

In Mexico, it is called achichilique pico naranja (the western grebe is called the achichilique pico amarillo). A common name advocated in Spain for this bird is the calque achichilique de Clark.

== Description ==
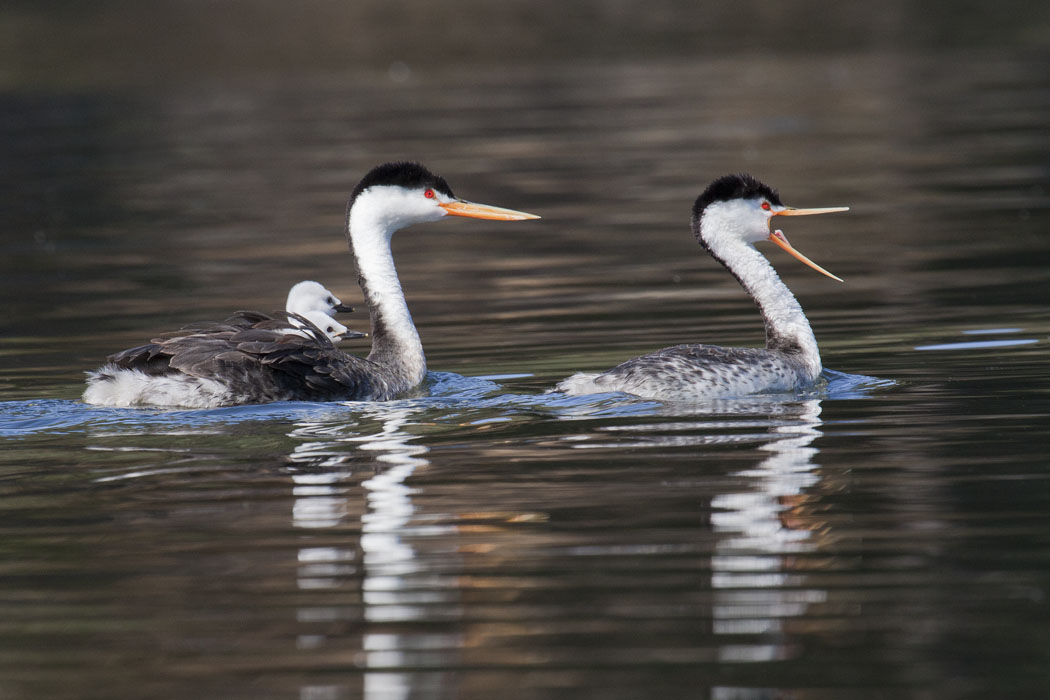
A family in California, USA. Two chicks are riding on one parent's back

Clark's grebe closely resembles the western grebe and occurs in the same colonies together with it. Storer and Nuechterlein in 1992, following earlier morphological studies by Storer and others, define the species as being distinguished from the western grebe by an overall paler plumage on its back, as well as a larger portion of its face covered in white, as it extends above the eyes, rather than just below them. A distinguishing feature is its bill, which is bright yellow in the US, whereas the Western Grebe's bill is greenish-yellow in the US, which had been noted by others. Storer and Nuechterlein in 1992 claim that the bill is slightly upturned in this species whereas the western grebe has a straight bill, this was not noted in earlier studies.

The grebe has a long, slender neck and the species ranges in size from 22–29 inches (56–74 cm), with a wingspan of 24 inches (61 cm). Clarks' grebe has a weight range of 25.3–44.4 oz (720–1,260 g).

There are few changes between the sexes, the most notable feature that distinguishes males from females is the presence of a slight crest on the heads of males. In juveniles, the plumage is again similar to the Western Grebe, however it is also paler compared to the greyer Western species.

Its relative size compared to the western grebe is confused. Dickerman showed that grebes from the south of the range were smaller than northern examples, irrespective of which color morph, with both morphs being the same size depending on location, and Dickerman originally reinstated the name A. clarkii in 1963 for the smaller, southern populations (irrespective of which color morph). Studies by Storer, Ratti, Mayr and Short in the 1960–70s did not find any size differences between morphs. Nonetheless, some publications now state the paler-coloured grebes are slightly smaller, which might be due to confusion with the species concept advocated by Dickerman (in which Clark's grebe doesn't not occur in the USA or Canada, pale-coloured grebes in the US and Canada are western grebes, and dark-colored morphs in Mexico are Clark's grebe).

Although darker and lighter-colored morphs of grebes occur in the resident non-migratory populations occur in Mexico, it is unclear if these can be distinguished by the other morphological characteristics described above, as most studies have only looked at US populations. Lighter-colored morphs in Mexico are said to have orange-coloured bills, and the darker morphs have yellow bills. In the winter in California numerous examples of dark-colored western grebes displayed the mostly white face of Clark's grebe, although this was intermediate and thought to be possibly due to seasonal changes.

== Taxonomy ==
Clark's grebe (Aechmophorus clarkii) is a waterbird of the family Podicipedidae in the order Podicipediformes, which are related to flamingos.

=== History ===
This taxon is extremely similar to the western grebe: it has the same behaviour, including the elaborate courtship displays, occurs sympatrically in the same range and has the same migrations, and is morphologically almost alike, with this bird most noticeably being somewhat paler in colouration. The two taxa can even successfully cross-breed, with intermediates as a result. As such, it was commonly thought to be a paler-colored morph (a version with paler colours and more white), as occurs in many bird species.

In 1858, the lighter-coloured morph had first been described as a separate Mexican and Californian species, Podiceps clarkii by George N. Lawrence. Lawrence cited three specimens as representative of his new species, but did not cite a specific holotype. Of the three specimens Lawrence used, two were larger, migratory birds from California, whereas a single specimen was a smaller bird from Laguna Santa Maria in Chihuahua. Deignan designated this last specimen as the holotype in 1961.

After the presence of this taxon throughout the range of the western grebe was discovered, along with the identical behaviour, the two taxa were synonymised, and this situation was accepted by ornithologists throughout the first half of the 20th century.

According to Robert W. Storer, in 1965, besides the paler coloration, there were other more subtle morphological differences between the two taxa: the bill of the western grebe is greenish-yellow, whereas this grebe has a bright yellow bill, and furthermore the black color of the crown extends less far down for this grebe, with the black extending below the eye, the lores and the thin line of bare skin extending from the eye to the corner of the bill in the case of the western grebe, whereas in this grebe the black reaches somewhat less far, leaving a thin line of paler color above the eye. Subsequent studies also showed the frequency of lighter morphs appeared more common in the south of the range than in the north, being relatively common in Mexico according to studies by Dickerman in 1973, but rare in Canada according to Nero (1962) and Storer (1965).

Dickerman in 1963 was the first to cast doubt on the taxonomic status of the taxon, believing that the synonymy was incorrect, and thus he moved Lawrence's Podiceps clarkii to Aechmophorus clarkii, and restricted the distribution of this taxon to Mexico, rejecting Lawrence's identification of the larger-sized, pale-colored birds from California and elsewhere in the US and Canada as this taxon. His studies showed that there was little overlap in size measurements between Mexican and northern populations -irrespective of coloration; as such Dickerman's 1963 view was that A. clarkii are smaller grebes restricted to Mexico, which might be found in either light or dark morphs, and A. occidentalis are larger-sized, migratory grebes from the US and Canada also found in two colour morphs.

A study in 1979 based on late 1970s observations of pairs the birds courting or nesting, however, noted that the frequency with which two different colour morphs were seen together or were found nesting together was much lower than one would expect if the pairings were random, some reproductive isolating mechanism was keeping the taxa separate. It also found that although the birds inhabited the same wetlands and the same habitats, the populations were not randomly distributed, with the taxa preferentially nesting with their own morph, and colonies being in large part of one type or the other, despite that one morph was much rarer in frequency than the other. There was also a marked difference in reproductive success in the study area, with Clark's grebe being initially quite low in frequency at around 12%, but increasing to a third of the population of both taxa in a three-year period. The study used the black coloration of the crown to distinguish the two taxa, but it was noted that some grebes in California in the winter appeared to be the dark morph, but that the black of the crown reached less far -the lores being whitish, confusing this distinguishing feature.

In 1986, Dickerman, accepting a taxonomically significant difference between the two colour morphs, described the taxa A. occidentalis ssp. ephemeralis for the smaller Western grebes of southern Mexico, and A. clarkii ssp. transitionalis for the larger migratory North American Clark's grebe subspecies sympatric with the nominate Western grebe subspecies. In this view, the nominate form of A. clarkii constituted smallish, pale-colored grebes from Mexico.

By 1992, Storer and Gary L. Nuechterlein, both having studied the grebes in the 1970s, recognised the paler-coloured morphs in the US and Canada in the book The Birds of North America as A. clarkii, thus apparently rejecting Dickerman's species concept and subspecific classification, although they do not explicitly state this, and because this work does not include Mexico as part of North America, his work is not actually in their remit. Because of this, it is unclear if they consider the dark-coloured grebes of Mexico to be a morph of Clark's grebes, or to be smaller forms of western grebes.

=== Subspecies ===
Two subtaxa of grebe classified as subspecies of Aechmophorus clarkii were recognised in 1986:

- A. c. ssp. clarkii, (Lawrence, 1858) - Smaller subspecies comparable to the sympatric subspecies of Western Grebe (A. occidentalis ephemeralis) from north & central Mexico. Nominate.
- A. c. ssp. transitionalis, (Dickerman, 1986) - Larger than nominate clarkii, from Western North America between southeast Alaska south to north Mexico.

== Habitat and distribution ==
=== Habitat ===
Being waterbirds, they require bodies of water that offer the necessary food and shelter that they need to thrive—usually lakes or suitable wetlands—that are also in proximity to suitable tree cover that they can use for nesting.

=== Distribution ===
Clark's grebes occur seasonally throughout the majority of Western America, with a distribution ranging as far south as Mexico, and reaching as far north as British Columbia and Saskatchewan. They avoid the cold and are only found in central USA and Canada during the summer breeding season. In the US and Canada breeding is done across a large portion of the west of these two countries, spanning from British Columbia to Texas, for which the grebes tend to favour larger bodies of water and congregate in large flocks.

Storer and Nuechterlein in 1992 dubiously claim the birds winter in Central America, as well as in Mexico and some regions of California. Out of almost 100,000 records of this taxon logged at the Global Biodiversity Information Facility there are zero records found south of northern Oaxaca, Mexico.

The range of this bird in Mexico is distributed in two streaks southward; one from the California border along the Pacific coast throughout Baja California and across the gulf along the coast to southern Sonora, the other a higher altitude, inland distribution running down from the Big Bend region behind the Texas border down the mountains of central Mexico, with the highest concentration in population in the south from Jalisco to Puebla and northern Oaxaca, where the distribution abruptly ceases. These two distributional areas representing where grebes have ever been seen only meet each other in the very north of Mexico in a strip along the USA border, to the south they do not come together and are separated by a very large distance. It is completely absent from the Atlantic coast.

== Behaviour ==
=== Vocalizations ===
The calls of Clark's grebe are similar to its western counterpart, however, during courtship the birds make an 'advertising call' to attract mates—this sounds like a single, extended kreeeed as opposed to the two-note kreed-kreet of the western grebe. The calls of the grebe tend to vary very little between sexes.

=== Diet ===
Thought to be a fish specialist in the early 20th century as a result of the examination of their pellets and stomach contents, it was shown by 1962 that Clark's grebe is actually an opportunist when it comes to the food it eats, and is less picky with its selection than previously imagined. This means that the species will actually consume a wide variety of things such as salamanders, crustaceans, polychaete worms and insects while diving and foraging for their preferred small fish, so long as they fit the size constraints of the bill.

=== Reproduction ===
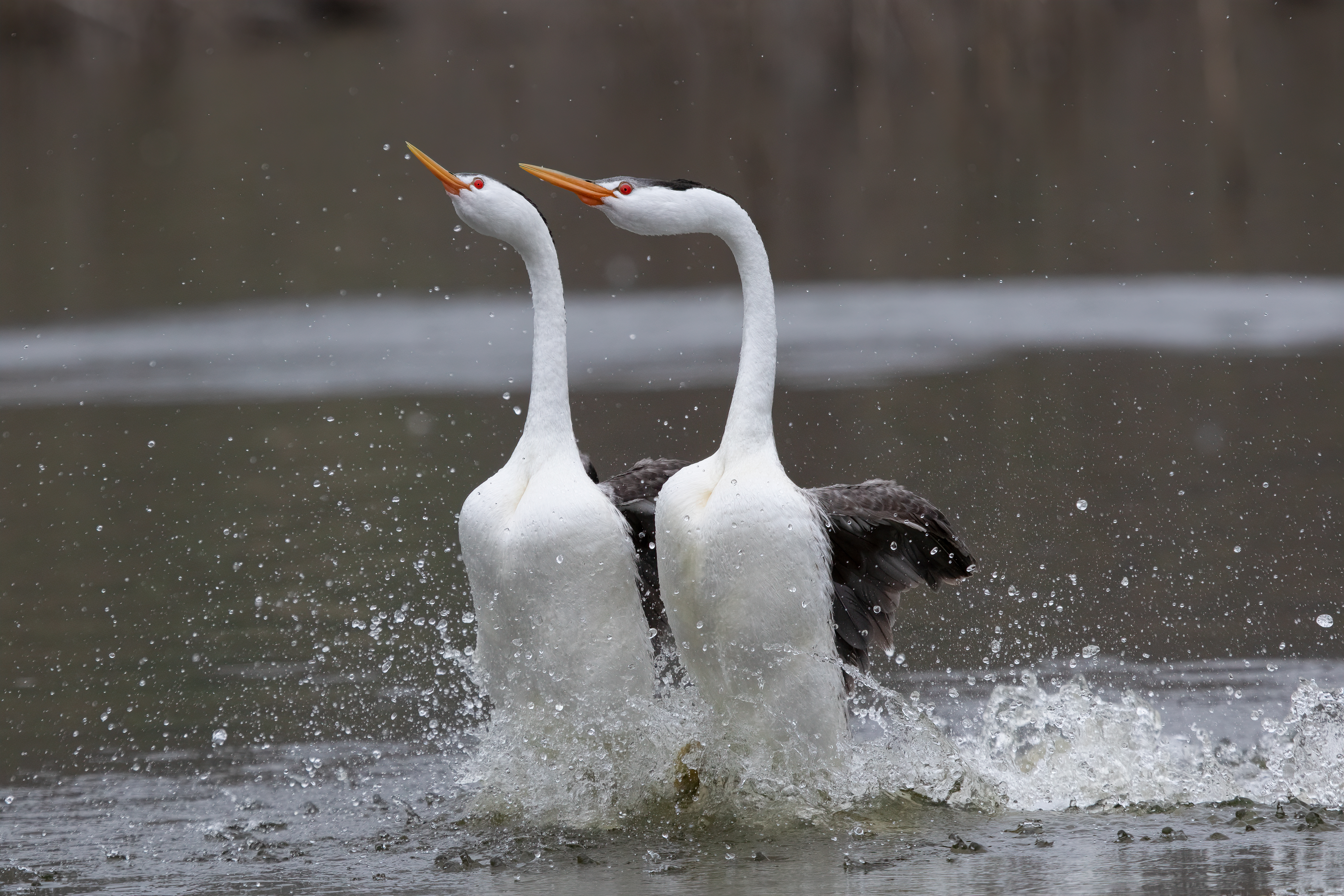
Rushing Clark's Grebes

Clark's grebes appear to have semi-monogamous behavior, staying with a single mate, but possibly only for a single season as far as known. Unpaired males far outnumber the females. Males, while they stay with their mate until at least a few weeks after the hatching of their young, will have several sexual partners in their lifetime. It is less known if pairs will eventually mate again in the future. There are two courtship ceremonies that are performed before selection and mating take place: the "rushing ceremony" and the "weed ceremony". They entail a sequence of performances and advertisements/dances with the partner, or presenting the partner with a bundle of weeds and performing a different set of dances, respectively. As there are fewer females than males, the final decision of whether or not mating occurs depends on the females. Therefore, there is a level of sexual selection within the species. These courtships take place during spring migration and shortly after arriving on the breeding grounds.

While there are very few cases of breeding between Clark's and western grebes, there have been cases where phenotypic hybrids (birds with plumage that is similar to both species) have mated and produced fertile offspring. It is believed, however, that this becomes less likely when the individuals are from different migrations and are not hybrids, as they have a greater chance of failing during the courtships.
