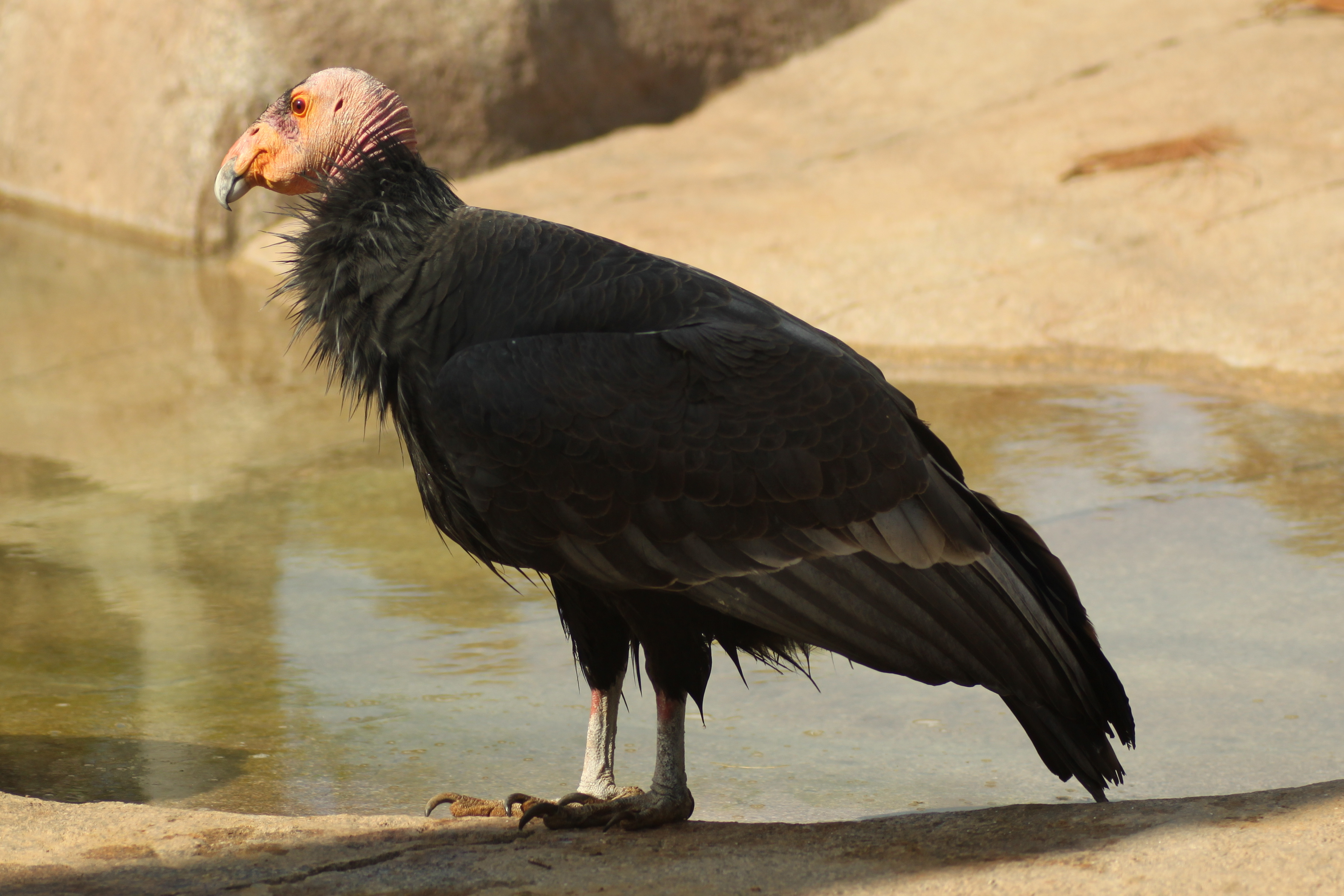
- California condor (Gymnogyps californianus)

Scientific classification
- Kingdom: Animalia
- Phylum: Chordata
- Class: Aves
- Order: Accipitriformes
- Family: Cathartidae
- Genus: Gymnogyps; Lesson, 1842

Species
- Gymnogyps californianus; †Gymnogyps varonai; †Gymnogyps amplus; †Gymnogyps howardae; †Gymnogyps kofordi

= Gymnogyps =

Gymnogyps Temporal range: Pleistocene–present

Genus of birds

Gymnogyps is a genus of New World vultures in the family Cathartidae. There are five known species in the genus, with only one being extant, the California condor.

== Fossil species ==
- Gymnogyps amplus was first described by L. H. Miller in 1911 from a broken tarsometatarsus. The species is the only condor species found in the La Brea Tar Pits' Pit 10, which fossils date to "a Holocene radiocarbon age of 9,000 years." The smaller, modern California condor may have evolved from G. amplus.
- Gymnogyps howardae was described from the Late Pleistocene (Lujanian) asphalt deposits known as the Talara Tar Seeps, near Talara, northwestern Peru. It lived about 126,000-12,000 years ago.
- Gymnogyps kofordi was described from late Pleistocene Florida. Its holotype is a right tarsometatarsus, but additional remains including a partial skull have been referred to it.
- Gymnogyps varonai is known from fossils found in the late Pleistocene to early Holocene tar seep deposits in Cuba. It may have fed upon carcasses from large mammals such as ground sloths.
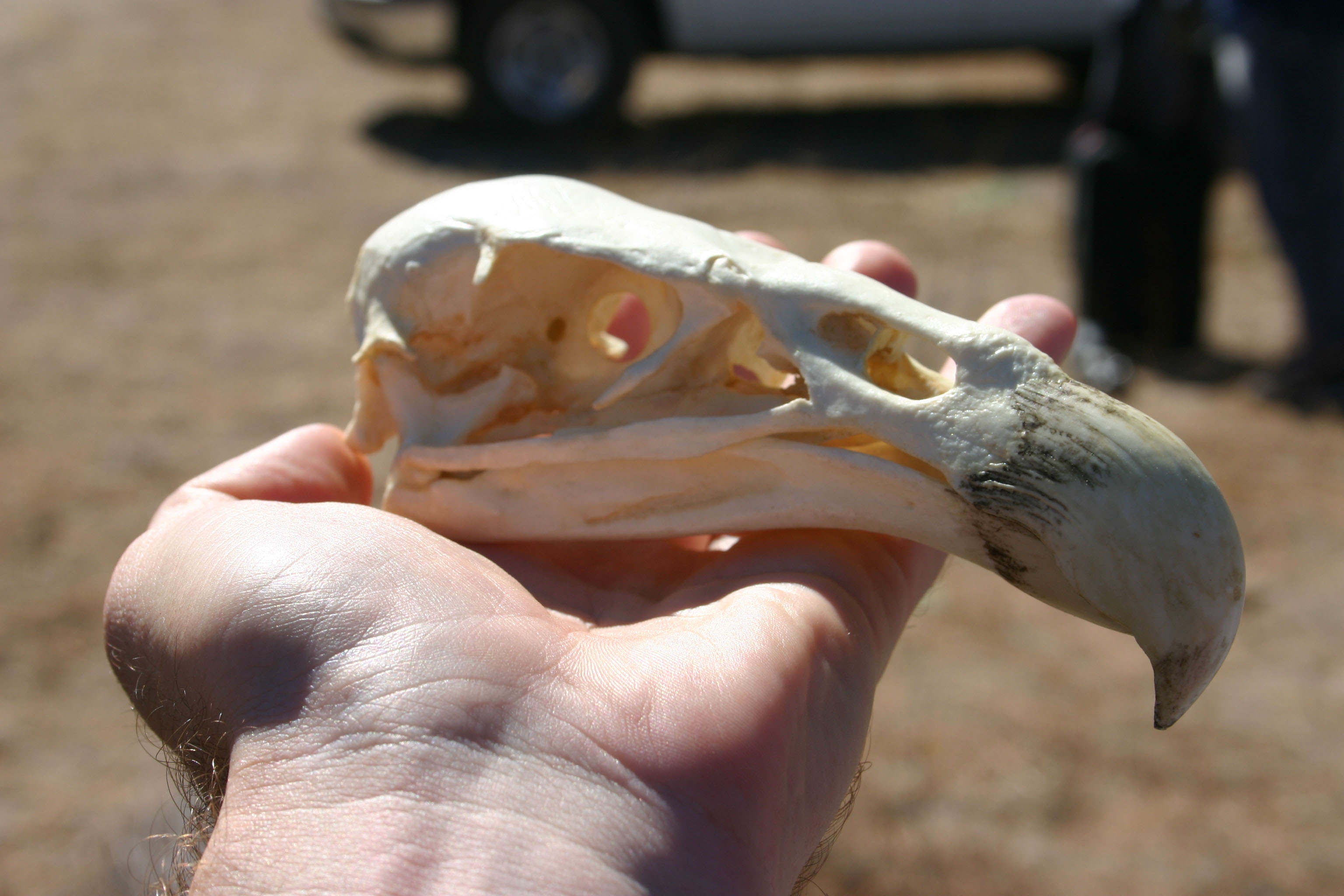
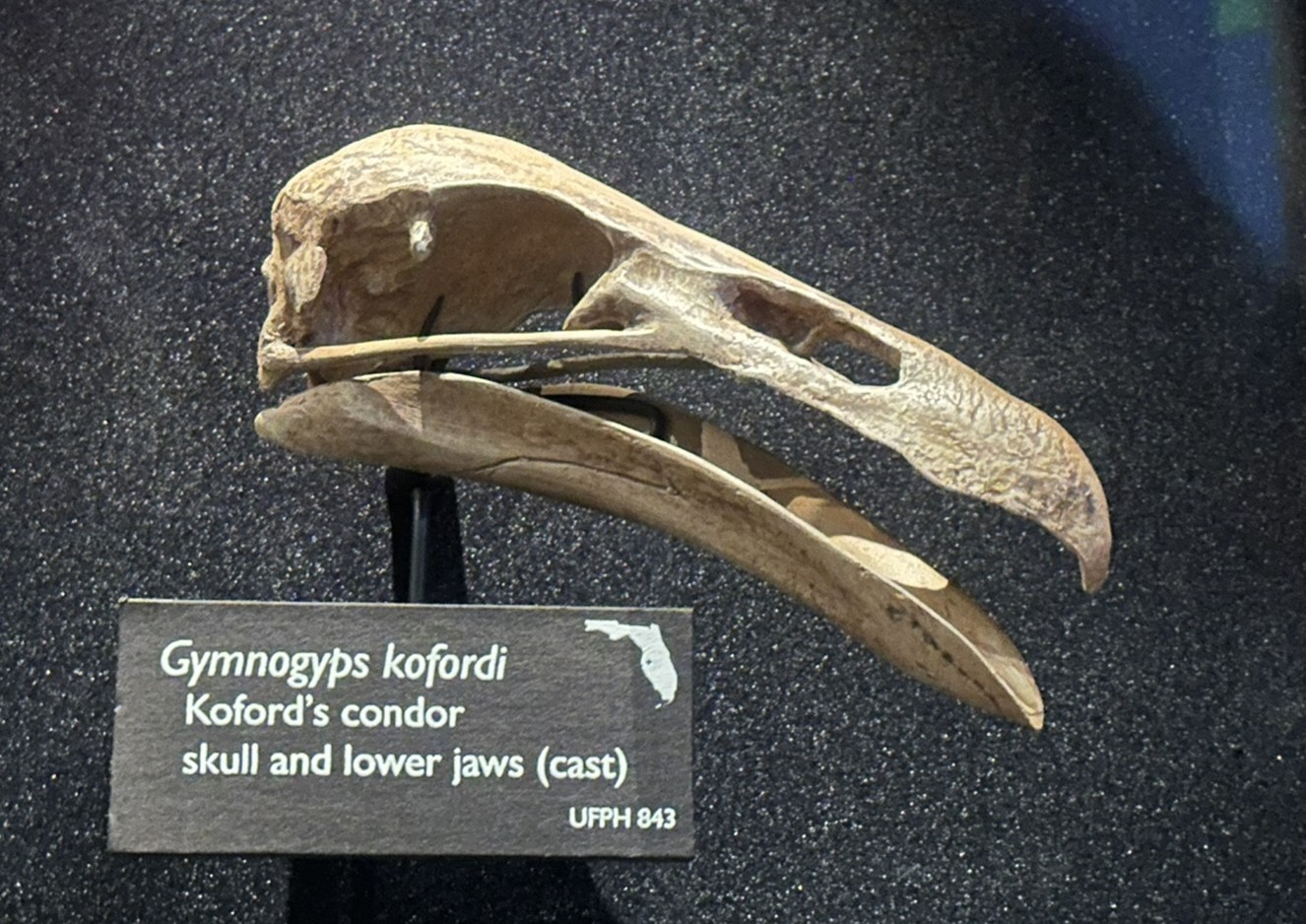
  Skulls of G. californianus (left) and †G. kofordi (right), showing the latter's longer nares. †G. kofordi's rhamphotheca is not shown here. Also not shown here is the more robust postorbital process and more pronounced occipital region of †G. kofordi.
