= Gigantohierax =

Gigantohierax Temporal range: Quaternary, (Holocene) 0.012–0.005 Ma

Scientific classification
- Kingdom: Animalia
- Phylum: Chordata
- Class: Aves
- Order: Accipitriformes
- Family: Accipitridae
- Genus: †Gigantohierax; Arredondo & Arredondo, 2002

Type species
- †Gigantohierax suarezi Arredondo & Arredondo, 2002

Other species
- †Gigantohierax itchei Suaréz, 2020

Extinct genus of birds

Gigantohierax is a genus of eagle from the Quaternary of present-day Cuba. Little is known about the two known species of the genus other than their very large size.

== Species and discovery ==
It is known from two species, Gigantohierax suarezi and Gigantohierax itchei, and was first described by Arredondo & Arredondo in 2002 based on material found in cave deposits in Cuba. The second species was described in 2020 by William Suaréz, and was found in the Las Breas de San Felipe tar seeps, also in Cuba.

== Description ==
Gigantohierax is primarily known from fossils of the leg with bones of the femur and the tibiotarsus known. Based on their structure with the thigh having flared ends and twisted structure, these raptors may have been partially terrestrial but not necessarily entirely so, whereas few modern hawks and eagles travel in this manner. Furthermore, the osteology of Gigantohierax implied that it was robustly built, unlike some other large fossil buteonine fossil species. The two species of Gigantohierax differed In size. G. itchei was around 29% smaller than G. suarezi. However, what is certain is that Gigantohierax was extremely large. In fact, they are regarded as the largest accipitrid ever known to exist in the Americas. Furthermore, the fossil discovered of G. suarezi approach in size those of the Haast's eagle, which is considered the largest eagle and typical bird of prey known to have existed. G. suarezi was considerably larger than the harpy eagle, the largest extant eagle in the Americas (and one of the top two most massive living eagles). If Gigantohierax was nearly the size of Haast's eagle as projected, it may have been over 30 cm (12 in) greater in total length than the harpy eagle and around an estimated 40-50% heavier. Gigantohierax was one of several examples of Island gigantism in Quaternary Cuba, especially several birds and mammals. Of note is that Gigantohierax co-existed with a similarly record largest giant owl, Ornimegalonyx, representing the nocturnal near ecological equivalent.
