= Loye H. Miller =

American paleontologist

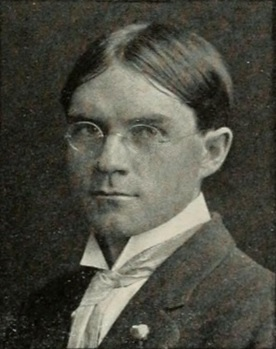
- Miller circa 1909
- Born: October 18, 1874; Minden, Louisiana
- Died: April 6, 1970 (aged 95); Davis, California
- Education: UC Berkeley
- Spouse: Anne Holmes
- Children: Alden H. Miller
- Scientific career
- Fields: Paleontology, Ornithology
- Workplaces: University of California, Berkeley; University of California, Los Angeles; University of California, Davis
- Theses: Contributions to avian palaeontology from the Pacific coast of North America (1912); Additional notes on the breeding habits and development of Autodax lugubris (1904)
- Doctoral advisor: John C. Merriam
- Other academic advisors: William E. Ritter
- Doctoral students: Willis E. Pequegnat; John F. Wohnus; Hildegarde Howard (committee)

Loye Holmes Miller (18 October 1874 – 6 April 1970), was an American paleontologist and zoologist who served as professor of zoology at the University of California, Los Angeles, University of California, Berkeley, and University of California, Davis.

Loye Miller was born in Minden, Louisiana, to parents George and Cora Holmes Miller and grew up in Riverside, California. Miller studied at the University of California, Berkeley, earning a B.A. in chemistry (1898), an M.A. in zoology (1904) and Ph.D. in paleontology (1912). He taught for three years at Oahu College (now called Punahou School) in Honolulu before earning his master's degree. He was first instructor of biology at Los Angeles State Normal School (which would later become UCLA), teaching from 1904 to 1919. He later became a professor, retiring in 1943.

His research included, among others, fossil birds from Pleistocene caves in California, the La Brea Tar Pits, and the Green River Formation in Oregon. With funding from the University Regents, he and John C. Merriam excavated La Brea from 1905 to 1907 and in 1912–1913. Miller was a fellow of the American Association for the Advancement of Science, American Ornithological Union, and California Academy of Sciences. He served as vice-president of the Society of Vertebrate Paleontology. He was awarded an honorary LL.D. by the University of California in 1951. Known as "Padre" to friends and colleagues, He supervised two Ph.D. students, two master's students, and served on the dissertation committee of paleontologist Hildegarde Howard.

Miller died April 6, 1970, in Davis, California. He was survived by his son Holmes Odell, three grandchildren and seven great-grandchildren. His elder son Alden Holmes Miller, who died in 1965, was a professor of zoology at UC Berkeley, and director of the Museum of Vertebrate Zoology.

== Books ==
- The Fossil Birds of California, an Avifauna and Bibliography with Annotations. University of California Publications in Zoology. 1942. (with Ida DeMay)
- Birds of the Campus, University of California Los Angeles. University of California Press. 1947. (with Robert C. Stebbins)
- Lifelong Boyhood: Recollections of a Naturalist Afield. University of California Press. 1950.
